= Fairway (navigation) =

Area of sea where ships can navigate safely

Fairway is a part of a water body (bay, harbor, river) containing the navigable channel (also known as a ship channel), a route suitable for ships of the larger size (with draft closer to the draft limit).

== Fairway depth, width, and height ==
The underwater cross-section of a ship in the channel is limited by the fairway depth and width (bridges may create restrictions for the height above the waterline). Fairway depth is a distance between the seabed/riverbed and the water surface. The fairway depth of a river varies with the season, so some standardized depth value is used, usually the one corresponding to the low navigable water level (LNWL) defined as the water level that the river stays above during almost the entire navigation season: statistically, the level shall stay below the LNWL for 20 ice-free days per year, corresponding to 5-6% of the ice-free period on European rivers. The fairway width is defined as a width of the cross-section of the river that corresponds to the fairway depth, the fairway height under the bridges is usually specified with respect to the highest navigable water level (HNWL).

== Fairway and navigable channel ==
The term "fairway" usually means all the navigable waters between the fairway buoys (that indicate the ends of the channel), even the routes only accessible to the lighter-draft vessels. Some authors restrict the definition to the linear approach part of a marine waterway, the approach channel leading into a port.

Legal definitions of the navigable channel differ depending on the context. In many cases any part of water body that can be navigated is considered to be navigable waters, although in the US (per Title 33 of the United States Code) the term applies to the waters over which the US Congress has jurisdiction to regulate the commerce, individual states apply similar criteria. The courts, however, use an expanded definition and include into the scope of Title 33, for example, waters "frequented by small, pleasure-fishing crafts".

The center of the navigable channel lies on the thalweg, so in the international river law in case of disputed borders the border is assumed to follow the thalweg, as doing otherwise would deny the navigation rights to one side.

== Fairway management in Europe ==
Many major European rivers (e.g., Rhine, Danube, Moselle, Meuse, and Sava) have long-established systems for waterway management. Some countries, primarily in Scandinavia, charge the ships fairway dues, fees intended to support maintenance of the fairways (e. g., dredging). The following table contains the parameters of some of the European waterways.

Fairways on European river systems
River basin	Authority	Depth	Width	Height	Days of availability
Danube	Danube Commission	2.50 m (draft)	50–180 m	6.40-10.00 m	343
Moselle	Moselle Commission	1.90-3.00 m (fairway depth)	40m	6.00 m	365
Rhine	Central Commission for Navigation on the Rhine	1.90-3.00 m (fairway depth), depending on the section	88–150 m	7.00-9.10 m	345
Sava	International Sava River Basin Commission	2.50 m (draft), 2.80 m for Class IV sections	55 m	7.00 m	343
Elbe		1.5–1.6 m (navigation channel depth) for section Geesthacht, 1.9 m (navigation channel depth) for other free-flowing sections, 2.2 m (draft) for regulated section			
Meuse	International Meuse Commission	2.50 m (draft)		5.25 m	
Oder		1.80 m (navigation channel depth) for border section, 3.00 m (navigation channel depth) for Klützer Querfahrt			
Scheldt	International Scheldt Commission	2.50 m (draft)		5.25 m	

== Fairway management in the US ==
Inland waterways in the United States are managed by the US Army Corps of Engineers (USACE). A mechanism similar to the fairway dues, a Harbor Maintenance Tax on imports is used to finance the maintenance (primarily dredging) of the ports on the coasts and Great Lakes.

Fairways on US rivers
River basin	Authority	Depth	Width	Height	Length	Days of availability
Missouri River	USACE	2.70 m	91 m		1181 km	245
Upper Mississippi River (UMR)-Illinois Waterway (IWW)	USACE	9 ft	300–500 m		1200 miles	245 for UMR; IWW operates year-round

== Sources ==
- Muilerman, Gert-Jan; Maierbrugger, Gudrun; Armbrecht, Henrik; Schepper, Karin de; Turf, Sim; Liere, Richard van; Quispel, Martin (2018). Good Navigation Status: guidelines towards achieving a Good Navigation Status. Luxembourg: Publications Office of the European Union. doi:10.2832/148049. ISBN 978-92-79-81043-5.
- Alshareef, Mohammed Hamed (2019). Three Essays on Waterborne Transportation (PDF) (PhD thesis). Fargo, North Dakota: North Dakota State University.
- USACE (2004). Upper Mississippi River-Illinois Waterway System Navigation Feasibility Study, Integrated Feasibility Report: Environmental Impact Statement.
- Upper Mississippi River Navigation Charts (in Italian). U.S. Army Engineer District, Rock Island. 1989.
- Merkel, Axel; Lindgren, Samuel (2022). "Effects of fairway dues on the deployment and utilization of vessels: Lessons from a regression discontinuity design". Transport Policy. 126: 204–214. doi:10.1016/j.tranpol.2022.07.018.
