= Wintrich =

- Municipality
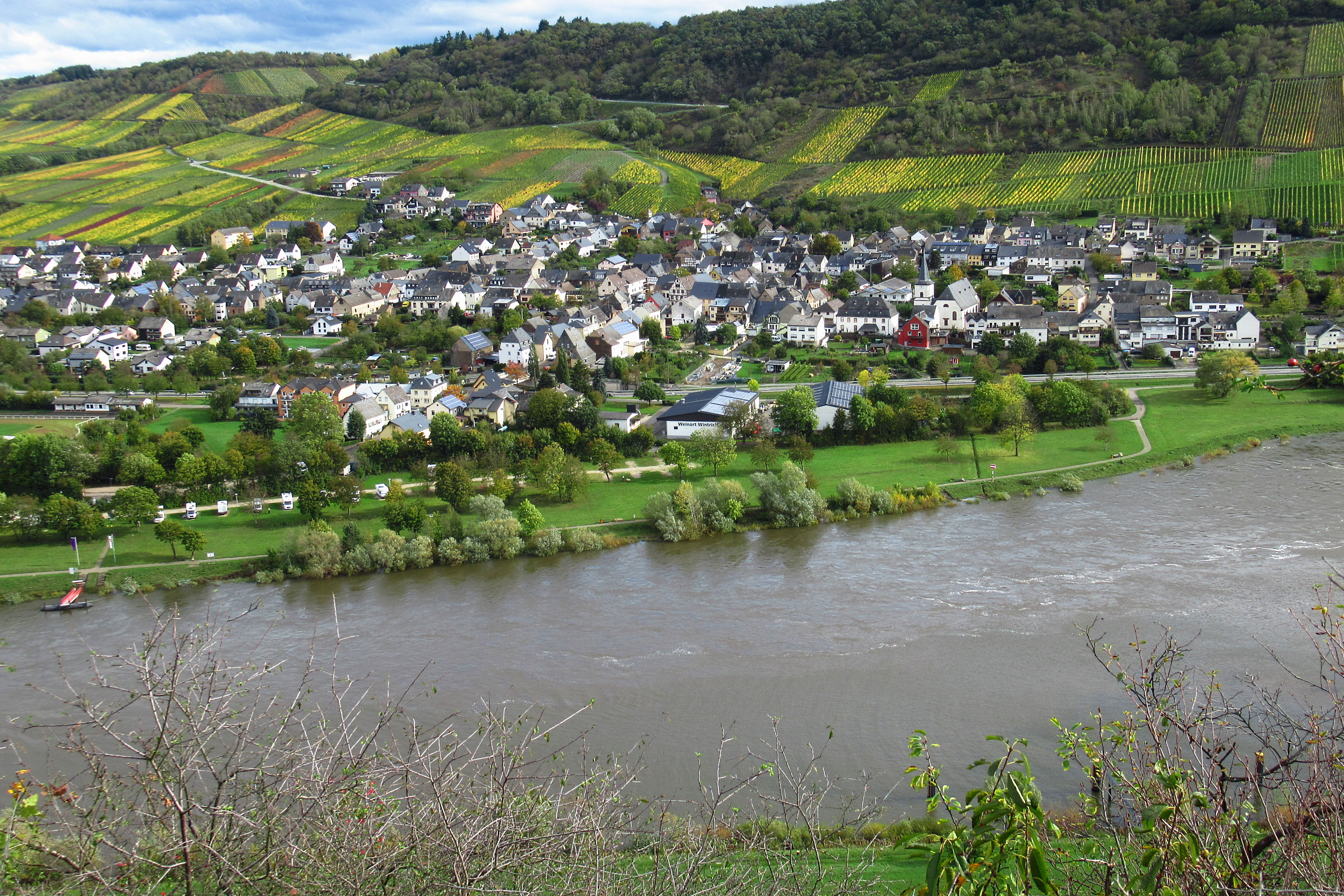
- Wintrich on the Mosel river

- Coat of arms

- Location of Wintrich within Bernkastel-Wittlich district
- Interactive map of Wintrich
- Location within Germany Location within Rhineland-Palatinate
- Coordinates: 49°53′05″N 06°57′12″E
- Country: Germany
- State: Rhineland-Palatinate
- District: Bernkastel-Wittlich
- Municipal assoc.: Bernkastel-Kues

Government
  - Mayor: Dennis Binz

Area
  - Total: 17.59 km^{2} (6.79 sq mi)
- Elevation: 140 m (460 ft)

Population (2025-12-31)
  - Total: 917
  - Density: 52.1/km^{2} (135/sq mi)
- Time zone: UTC+01:00 (CET)
  - Summer (DST): UTC+02:00 (CEST)
- Postal codes: 54487
- Dialling codes: 06534
- Vehicle registration: WIL
- Website: www.wintrich-mosel.de

Wintrich is an Ortsgemeinde – a municipality belonging to a Verbandsgemeinde, a kind of collective municipality – in the Bernkastel-Wittlich district in Rhineland-Palatinate, Germany.

== Geography ==
=== Location ===
The municipality lies in the natural and cultivated landscape of the Moselle valley on the river’s right bank, where the valley broadens out into country marked by even slopes and former oxbows of the Moselle. Against this, however, moderate slopes covered in vineyards and in places by woods climb up to the Eifel over on the other side of the river. Wintrich belongs to the Verbandsgemeinde of Bernkastel-Kues, whose seat is in the like-named town.

=== Nearby municipalities ===
Neighbouring municipalities are, among others, Minheim, Kesten and Brauneberg. The nearest middle centres are Bernkastel-Kues, some 10 km away, and Wittlich, some 20 km away. Trier lies some 40 km away.

=== Climate ===
The barrier formed by the Eifel shields Wintrich from west winds, putting it in a rain shadow and sometimes subjecting it to a föhn effect. At the same time, the warming of the air is favoured by the only slight exchange of air with the surrounding area. Tied in with this is the high humidity due to ongoing evaporation of water from the Moselle, which, especially in summer, makes at times for heavy and muggy weather, and which also brings many storms along with it. On the whole, an almost Mediterranean climate prevails here, as witnessed by the record temperature of 41.2 °C in the shade, the highest ever air temperature recorded in the Federal Republic, confirmed in neighbouring Brauneberg on 11 August 1998.

== History ==
Quite early on, Celts, Romans and Franks settled the land where Wintrich would later stand. Wintrich had its first documentary mention in AD 960. the Celtic-Roman name vindriacum meant “Winemaking Village”; there has been winegrowing here since days of yore. Timber-frame houses, lanes with little nooks and crannies and old wineries bear witness to the historic tradition.

== Politics ==
The municipal council is made up of 12 council members, who were elected at the municipal election held on 7 June 2009, and the honorary mayor as chairman.

The municipal election held on 7 June 2009 yielded the following results:

Year	Kessler	Bollig	Wintrich	Kullik	Total
2009	5	4	1	2	12 seats

== Culture and sightseeing ==
=== Winegrowing ===
Winegrowing is practised in the vineyards of Geierslay, Ohligsberg and Stefanslay. Wintrich became widely known mainly for the “Großer Herrgott” vineyard (whose name means “Great Lord God”). In 1968, an uncommonly big crucifix was installed on the Geyerskopf in the vineyards, which fit the old name. It serves as the winemaking village’s landmark, and can easily be seen both day and night, for it is floodlit then, from a great distance. Riesling is the customary grape variety here, although small quantities of Pinot, Müller-Thurgau, Kerner and Dornfelder are also grown.

=== Wintricher Passionsspiele ===
The Wintricher Passionsspiele (Wintrich Passion Plays) have been produced over several weeks every five years since 1902. They portray a part of Jesus Christ’s life. The plays are well attended, with 8,000 playgoers coming for the one-hundred-year jubilee. The production venue is the church in Wintrich, this offering the best suited backdrop. The greater part of the players comes from the Passion Play Club (Passionsspielverein) with its roughly 350 members. Besides the players, the choir is one of the most important elements. The last Passion Plays were held in 2007, meaning that the next ones will not be staged until 2012.

== Economy and infrastructure ==
Near Wintrich is a weir on the Moselle, but no bridge. A bypass road leads traffic around the village.
