= Moselle =

River in Western Europe

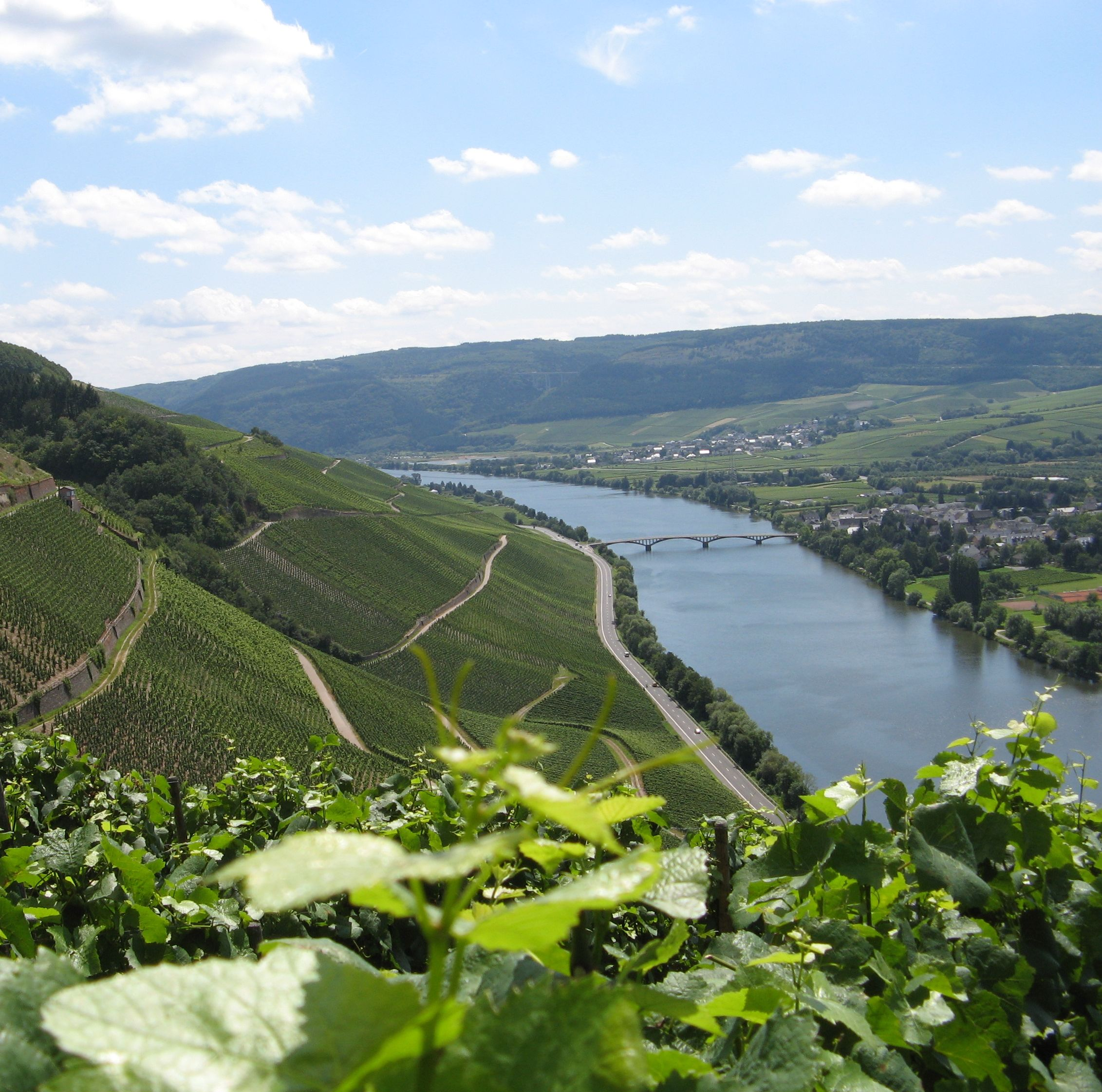
- Typical landscape of Moselle vineyards near Schweich

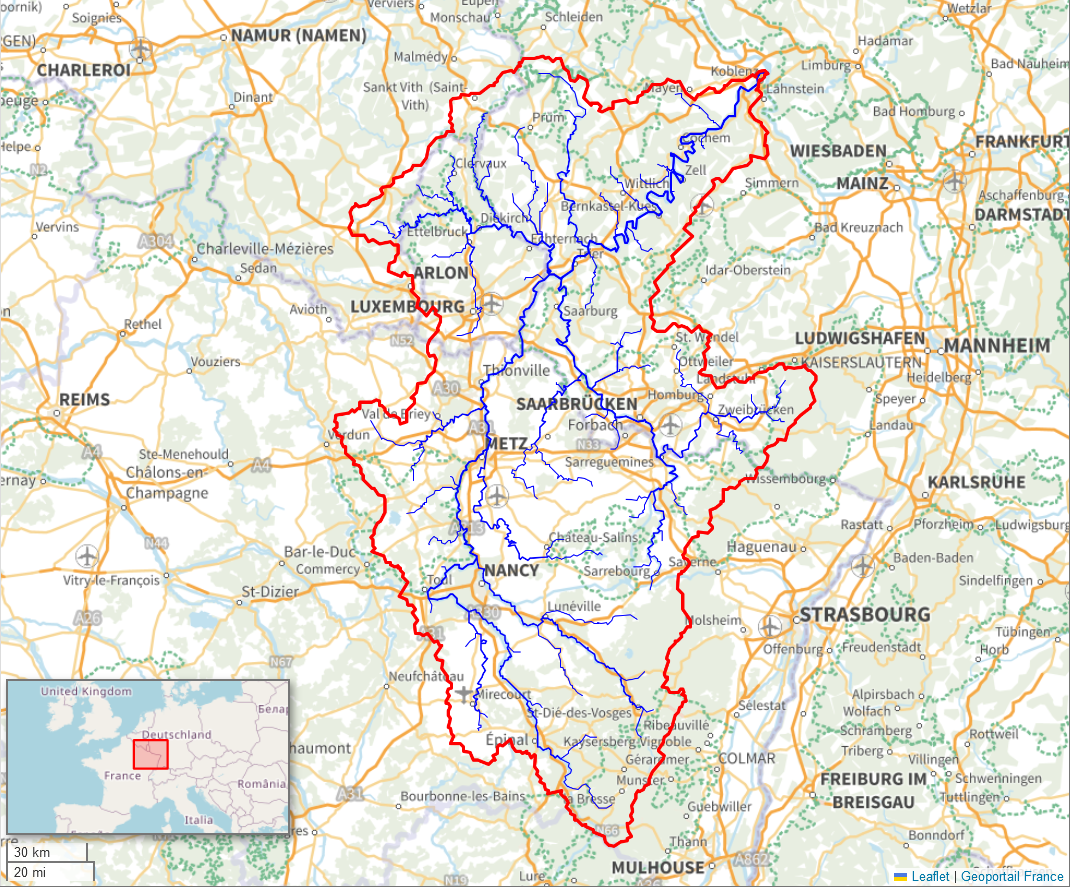
- Map of the Moselle River watershed
- Native name: La Moselle (French); die Mosel (German); Musel (Luxembourgish)

Location
- Countries: France; Germany; Luxembourg

Physical characteristics
- Source
  - location: Vosges mountains
  - elevation: 715 m (2,346 ft)
- Mouth
  - location: Rhine
  - coordinates: 50°21′58″N 7°36′25″E
- Length: 546 km (339 mi)
- Basin size: 28,111 km^{2} (10,854 mi^{2})
- Discharge
  - average: 284 m^{3}/s (10,000 cu ft/s)

Basin features
- Progression: Rhine→ North Sea

The Moselle (/moʊˈzɛl/ moh-ZEL, French: [mɔzɛl]; German: Mosel [ˈmoːzl̩]; Luxembourgish: Musel [ˈmuzəl]) is a river that rises in the Vosges mountains and flows through north-eastern France and Luxembourg to western Germany. It is a left bank tributary of the Rhine, which it joins at Koblenz. A small part of Belgium is in its basin as it includes the Sauer and the Our.

Its lower course "twists and turns its way between Trier and Koblenz along one of Germany's most beautiful river valleys." In this section the land to the north is the Eifel which stretches into Belgium; to the south lies the Hunsrück. The river flows through a region that was cultivated by the Romans. Today, its hillsides are covered by terraced vineyards where "some of the best Rieslings grow". Many castle ruins sit on the hilltops above wine villages and towns along the slopes. Traben-Trarbach with its Art Nouveau architecture and Bernkastel-Kues with its traditional market square are two of the many tourist attractions on the Moselle river.

== Name ==
The name Moselle is derived from the Celtic name form, Mosela, via the Latin Mosella, a diminutive form of Mosa, the Latin description of the Meuse, which used to flow parallel to the Moselle. So the Mosella was the "Little Meuse".

The Moselle is first recorded by Tacitus in Book 13 of his Annals and in Book 4 of his Histories.

The Roman poet Ausonius made it a literary theme as early as the 4th century. In his poem dated 371, called Mosella, which was published in 483 hexameters, this poet of the Late Antiquity and teacher at the Trier Imperial Court (Kaiserhof) described a journey from Bingen over the Hunsrück hills to the Moselle and then following its course to Trier on the road named after him, the Via Ausonia. Ausonius describes flourishing and rich landscapes along the river and in the valley of the Moselle, thanks to the policies of their Roman rulers.

The river subsequently gave its name to two French republican départements: Moselle and Meurthe-et-Moselle.

== Geography ==
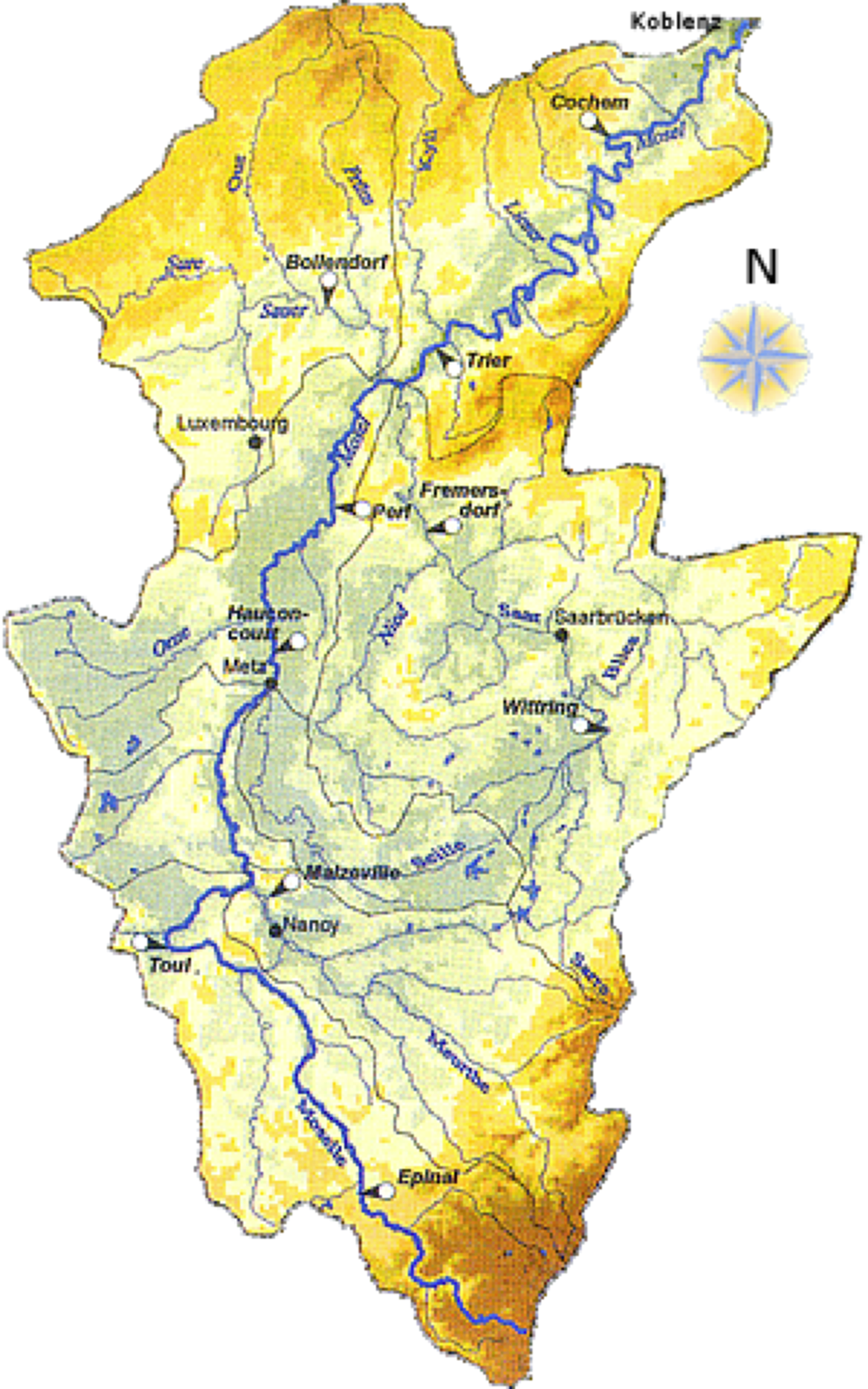
Moselle basin area

The source of the Moselle is at 715 m (2,346 ft) above sea level on the Col de Bussang on the western slopes of the Ballon d'Alsace in the Vosges. After 544 km (338 mi) it discharges into the Rhine at the Deutsches Eck in Koblenz at a height of 59 m (194 ft) above NHN sea level. The length of the river in France is 313 km (194 mi), for 39 km (24 mi) it forms the border between Germany and Luxembourg, and 208 km (129 mi) is solely within Germany.

The Moselle flows through the Lorraine region, west of the Vosges. Further downstream, in Germany, the Moselle valley forms the division between the Eifel and Hunsrück mountain regions.

The average flow rate of the Moselle at its mouth is 328 m^{3}/s (11,600 cu ft/s), making it the second largest tributary of the Rhine by volume after the Aare (560 m^{3}/s; 20,000 cu ft/s) and bigger than the Main and Neckar.

=== River sections ===
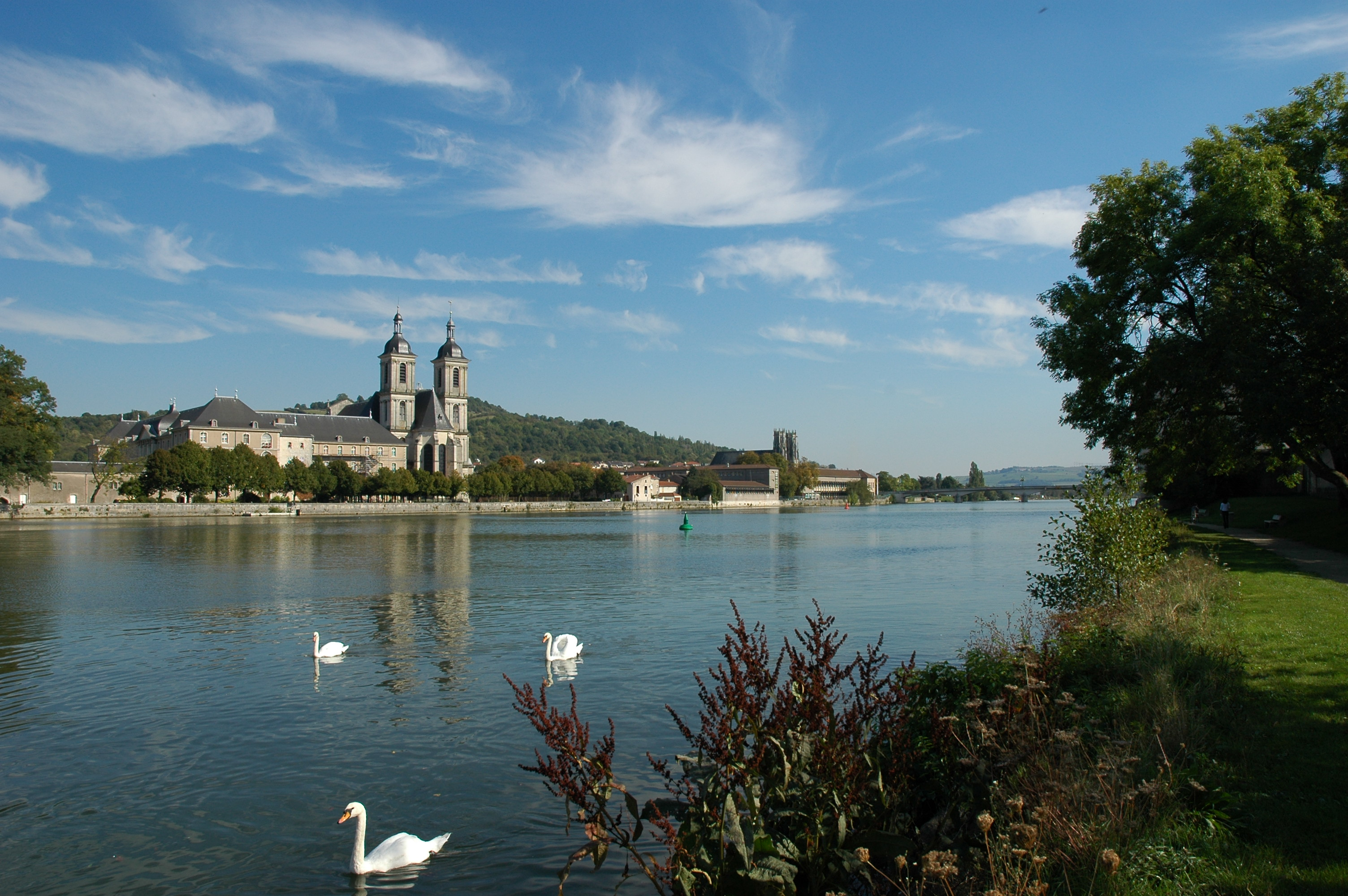
The Moselle at Pont-à-Mousson, France

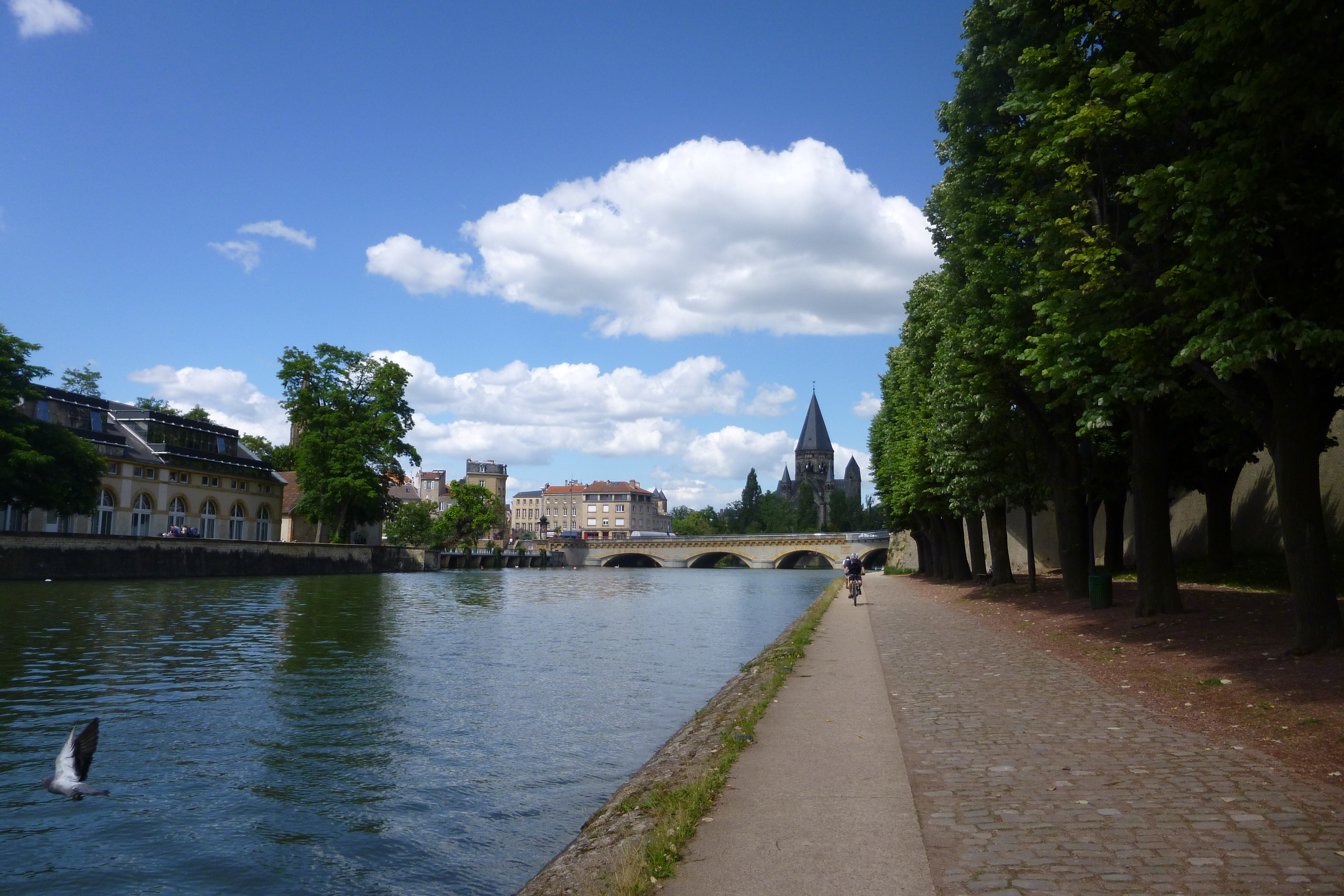
Arm of the Moselle entering the old town quarter of Metz

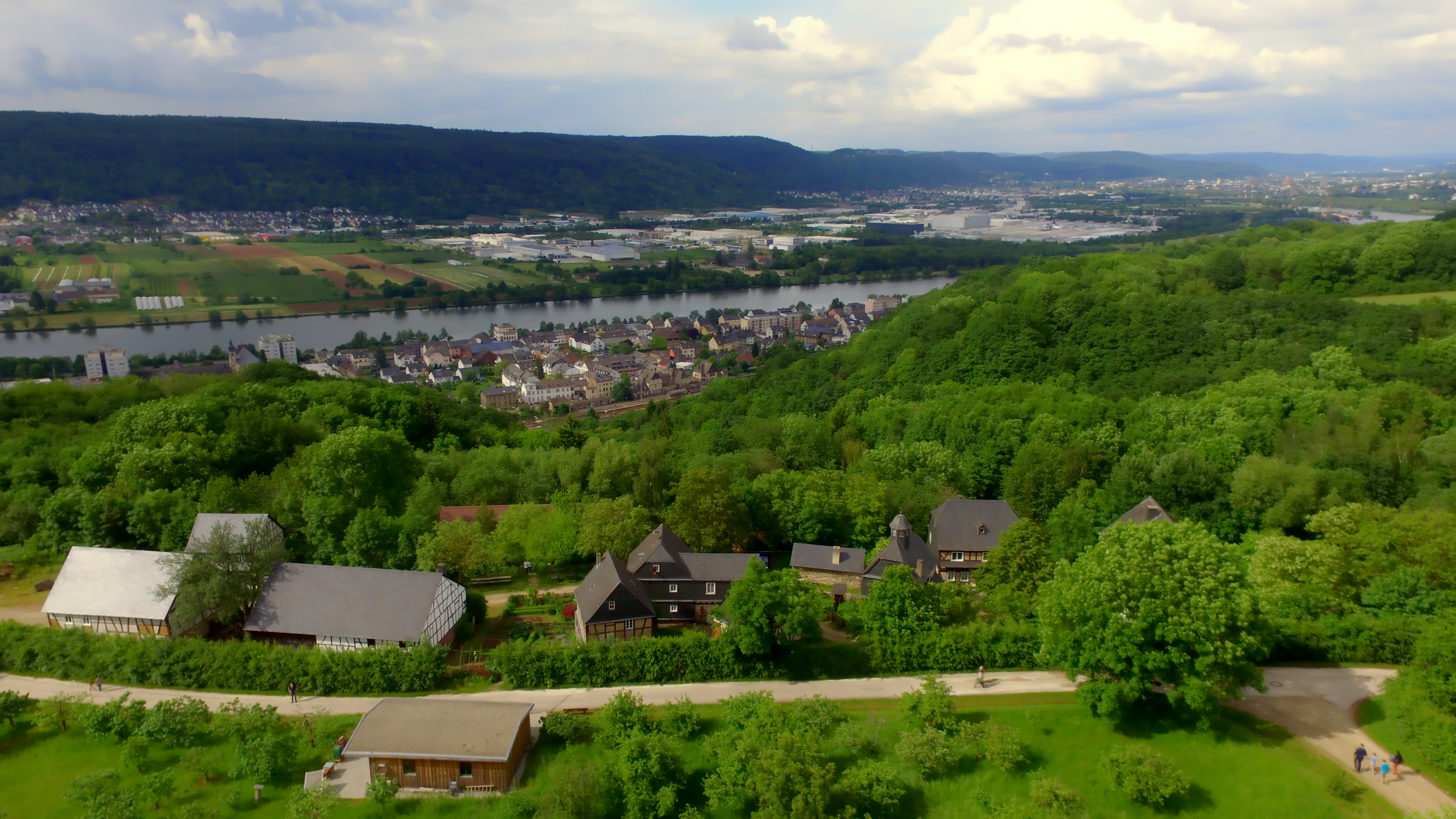
The Moselle valley from the Roscheider Hof Open Air Museum, Konz, Germany

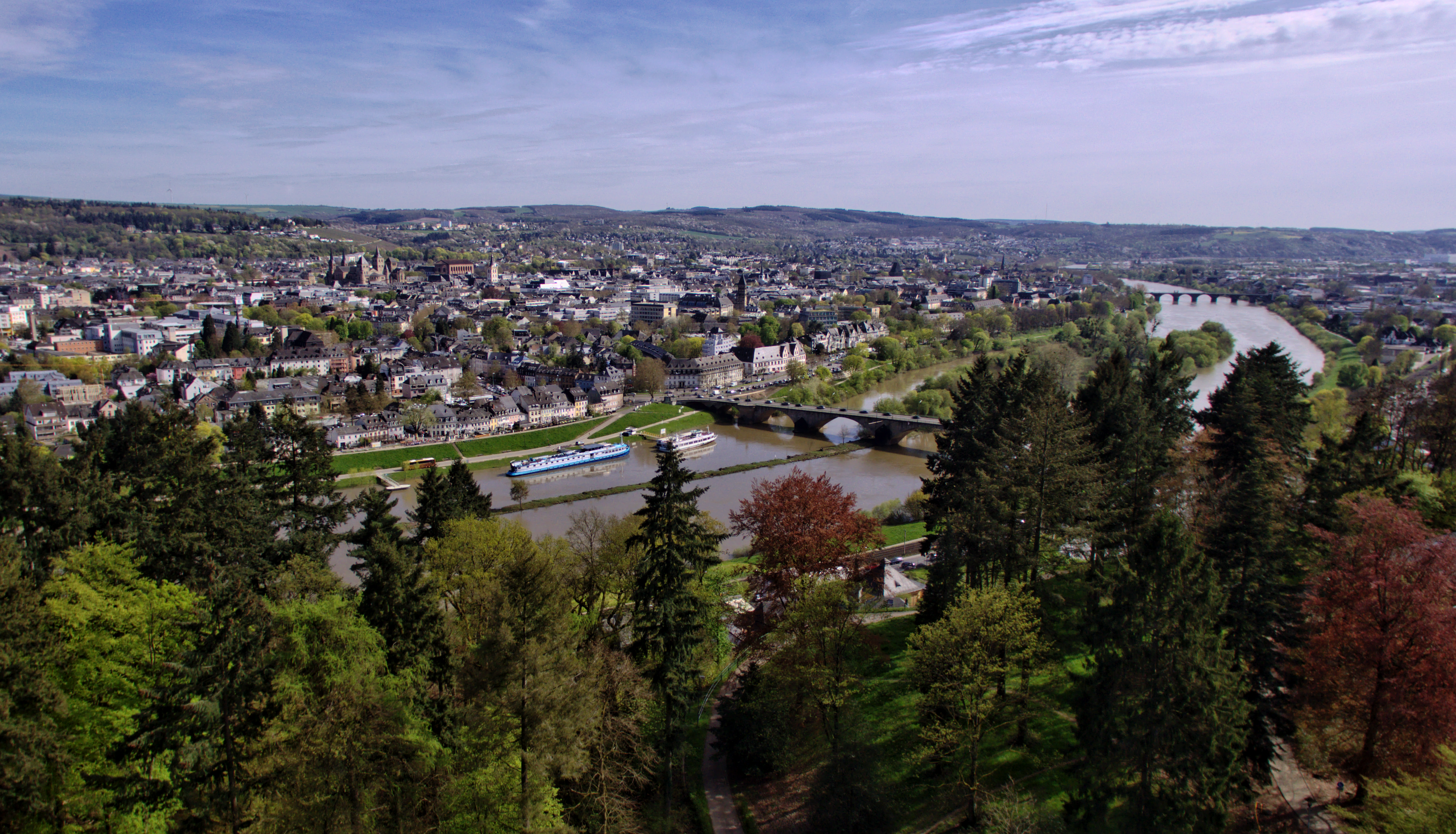
The Moselle at Trier, Germany

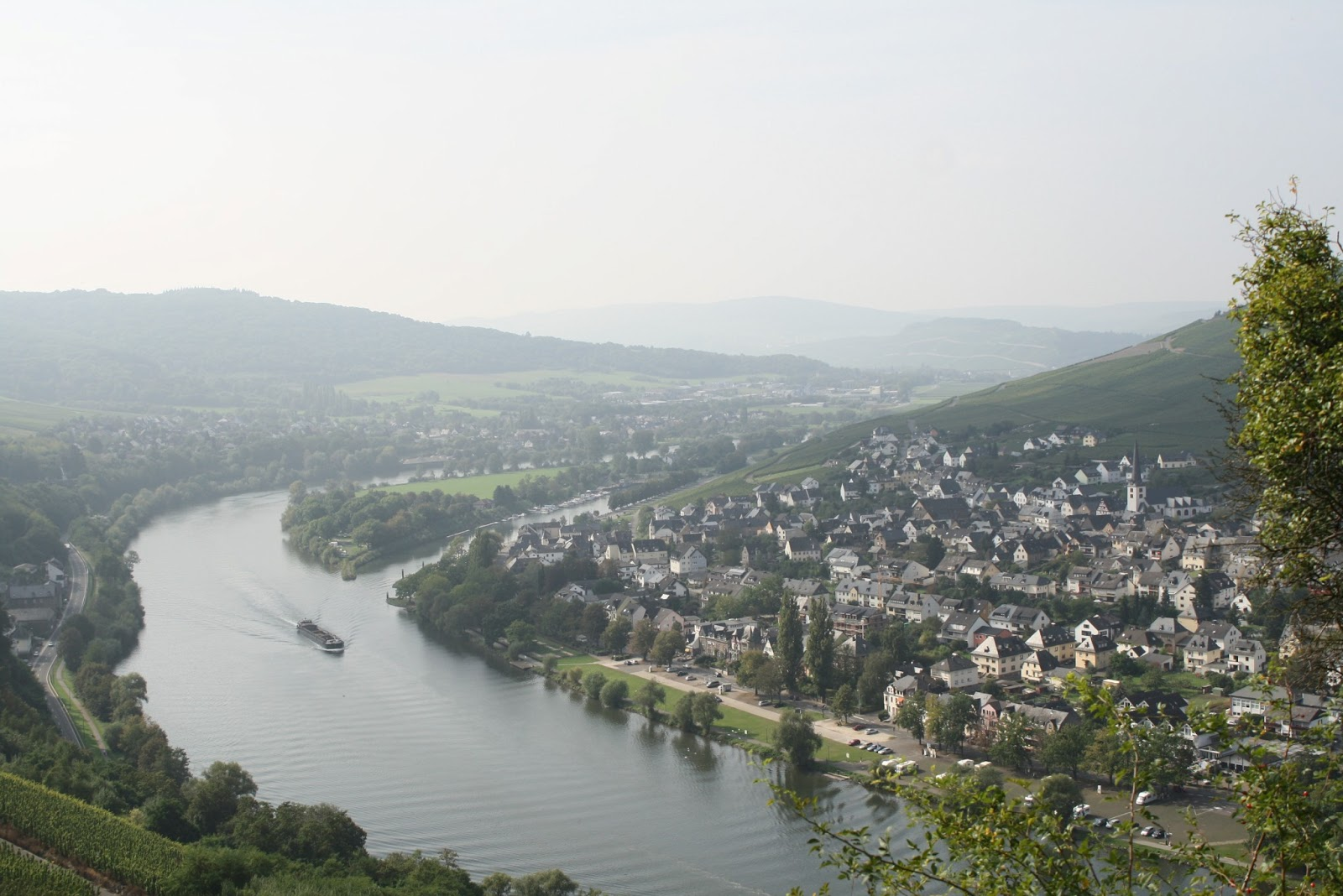
The Moselle near Cochem, Germany

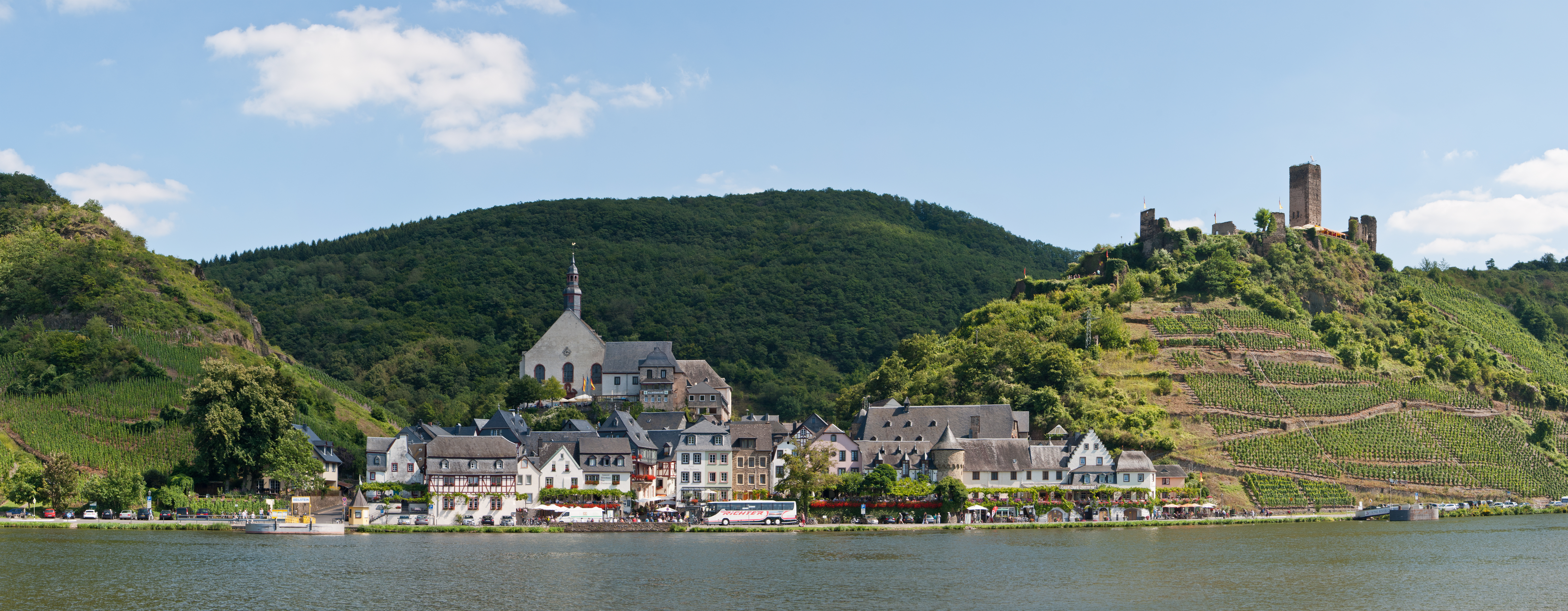
Beilstein on the Moselle

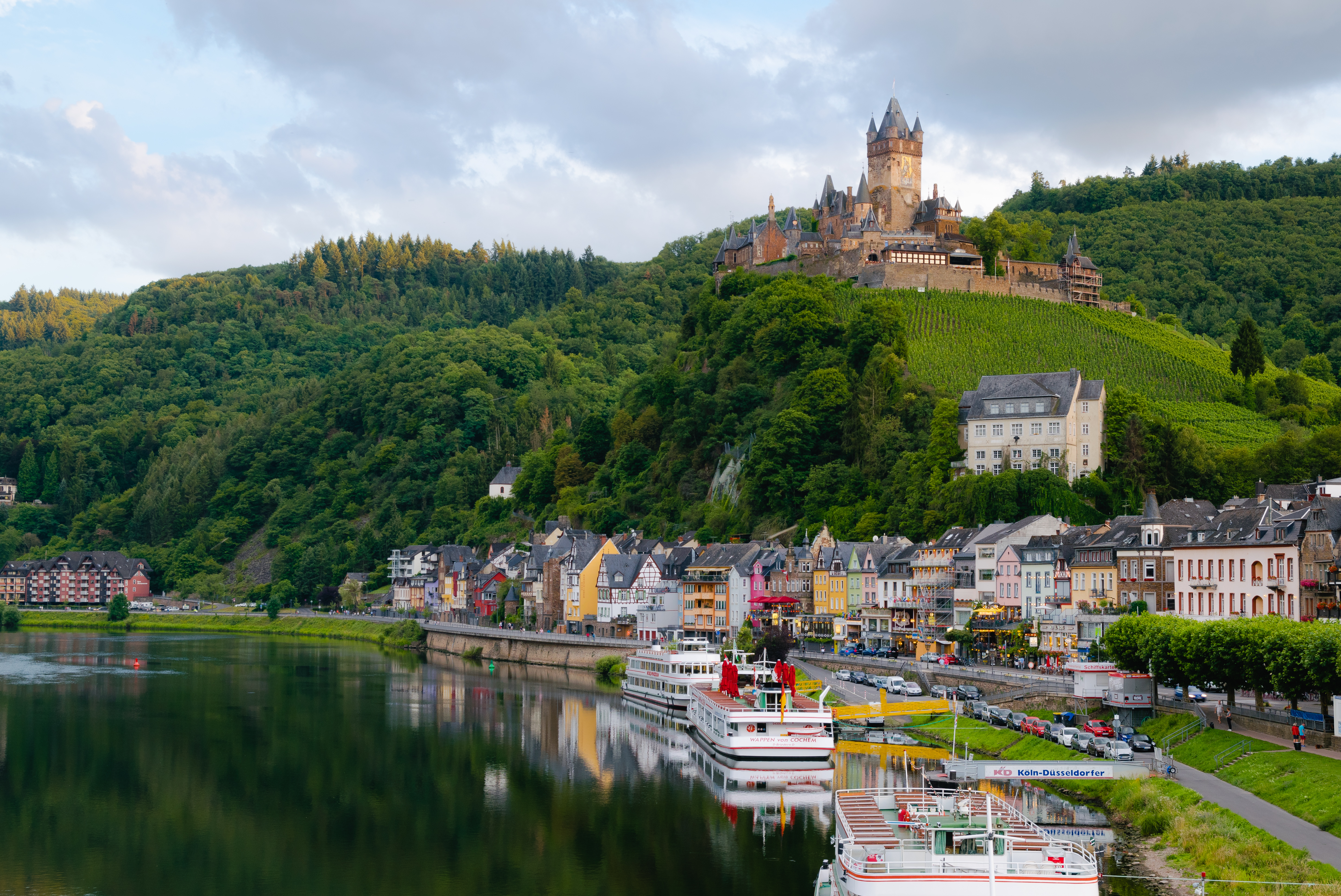
The Moselle at Cochem, Germany

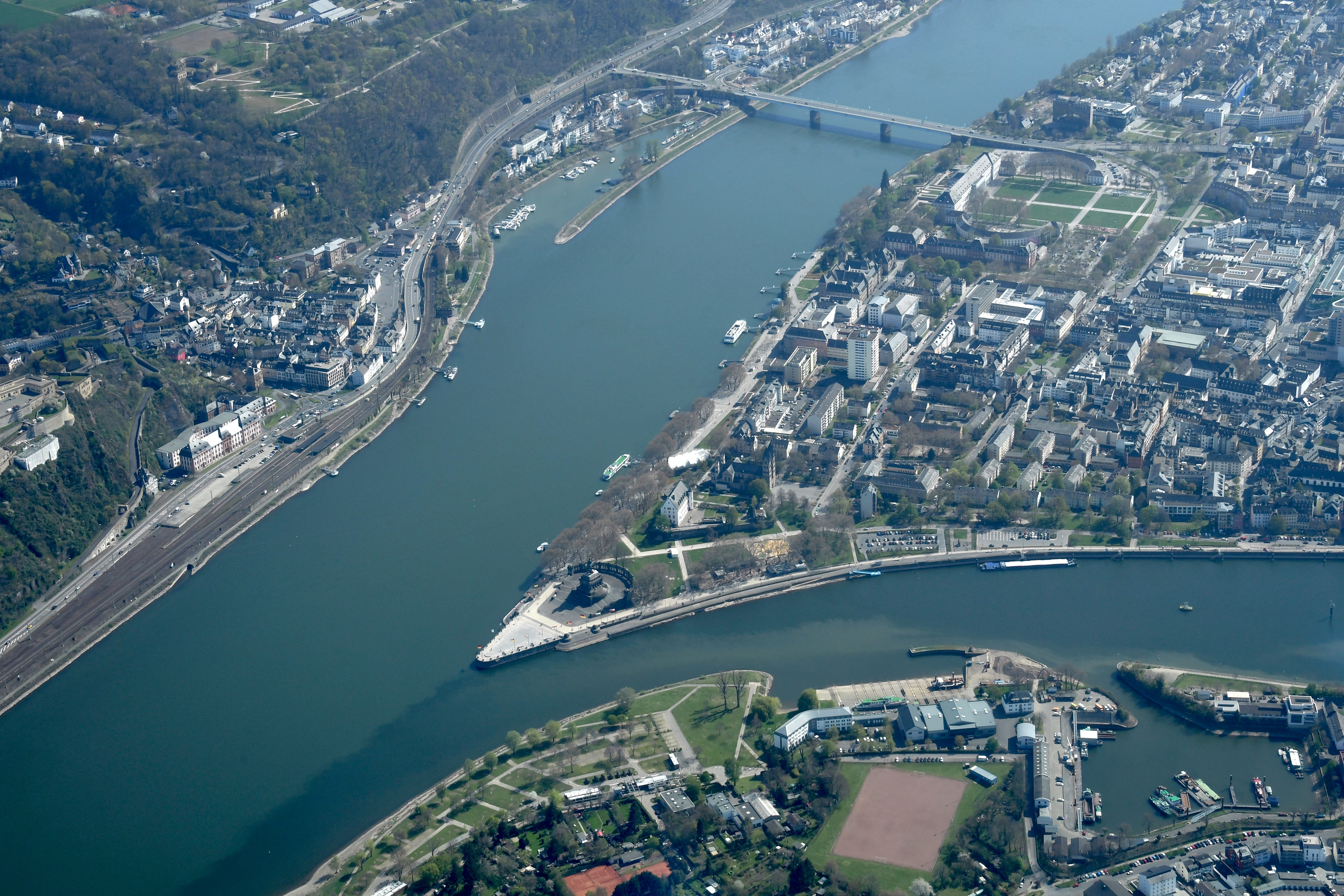
Confluence of the Moselle (right) and Rhine (left) rivers at the Deutsches Eck in Koblenz

The section of the Moselle from the France–Germany–Luxembourg tripoint near Schengen to its confluence with the Saar near Konz shortly before Trier is in Germany known (geographically incorrectly) as the Upper Moselle. The section from Trier to Pünderich is the Middle Moselle, the section between Pünderich and its mouth in Koblenz as the Lower Moselle or Terraced Moselle (Terrassenmosel). Characteristic of the Middle and Lower Moselle are its wide meanders cut deeply into the highlands of the Rhenish Massif, the most striking of which is the Cochemer Krampen between Bremm and Cochem. Also typical are its vineyard terraces.

From the tripoint the Moselle marks the entire Saarland–Luxembourg border.

=== Catchment ===
The catchment area of the Moselle is 28,286 km^{2} (10,921 sq mi) in area. The French part covers 15,360 km^{2} (5,930 sq mi), about 54 percent of the entire catchment. The German state of Rhineland-Palatinate has 6,980 km^{2} (2,690 sq mi), the Saarland 2,569 km^{2} (992 sq mi), Luxembourg 2,521 km^{2} (973 sq mi), Wallonia in Belgium 767 km^{2} (296 sq mi) and North Rhine-Westphalia, 88 km^{2} (34 sq mi).

=== Tributaries ===
The three largest tributaries of the Moselle are, in alphabetical order, the Meurthe, the Saar and the Sauer. The Meurthe was the old upper course of the Moselle, until the latter captured the former upper reaches of the Meuse and took it over. However, the Meuse only delivered a little more water than the Meurthe at its confluence. The Saar is the biggest of all the tributaries (78.2 m^{3}/s; 2,760 cu ft/s) as well as the longest (246 km; 153 mi). The Sauer is the largest left-hand tributary and drains the region on either side of the German-Luxembourg border. The largest tributary relative to the Moselle at its confluence is the Moselotte, which is about 40% greater by volumetric flow and thus represents the main branch of the Moselle system. At its mouth, the Moselle delivers 328 m^{3}/s (11,600 cu ft/s) of water into the Rhine after flowing for 544 km (338 mi).

==== List of tributaries ====
From the left

Madon, Terrouin, Esch, Rupt de Mad, Orne, Fensch, Gander, Syre, Sauer, Kyll, Salm, Lieser, Alf, Endert, Brohlbach, Elz.

From the right

Moselotte, Vologne, Meurthe, Seille, Saar, Olewiger Bach, Avelsbach, Ruwer, Feller Bach, Dhron, Ahringsbach, Kautenbach, Lützbach, Flaumbach, Altlayer Bach, Baybach, Ehrbach.

=== Towns ===
Towns along the Moselle are:

- in France: Épinal, Toul, Pont-à-Mousson, Metz and Thionville
- in Luxembourg: Schengen, Remich, Grevenmacher and Wasserbillig
- in Germany: Konz, Trier, Schweich, Bernkastel-Kues, Traben-Trarbach, Zell, Cochem and Koblenz

=== Adjacent mountain ranges ===
From Trier downstream the Moselle separates the two Central Upland ranges of the Eifel (to the northwest) and the Hunsrück (to the southeast).

== Geology ==
The Vosges, the present source region of the Moselle, were formed about 50 million years ago. In the Miocene and Pliocene epochs the ancient Moselle (Urmosel) was already a tributary of the ancient Rhine (Ur-Rhein). When, in the Quaternary period, the Rhenish Massif slowly rose, the meanders of the Moselle were formed between the Trier Valley and the Neuwied Basin.

== Water levels ==
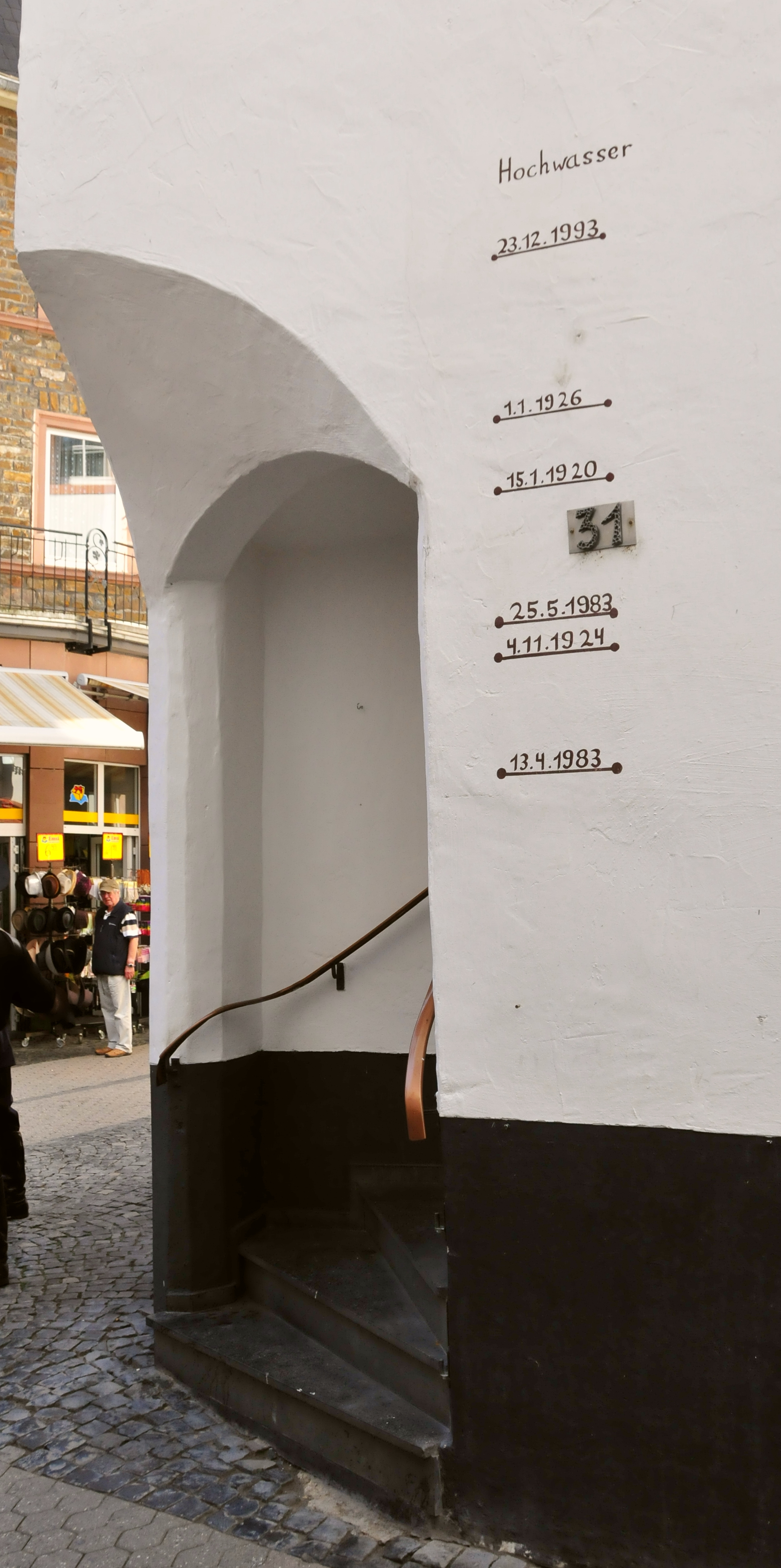
High water marks in the Old Town of Cochem

The highest navigable water level (HSW) is 6.95 m (22 ft 10 in) and normal level (NSt) is 2.00 m (6 ft 7 in) at the Trier Gauge (Pegel Trier).

High water:

- 11.28 m (37 ft 0 in), Trier Gauge on 21 December 1993
- 10.56 m (34 ft 8 in), Trier Gauge on 28 May 1983
- 10.33 m (33 ft 11 in), Trier Gauge on 23 January 1995
- 10.26 m (33 ft 8 in), Trier Gauge on 12 April 1983
- 9.92 m (32 ft 7 in), Trier Gauge on 27 February 1997

Low water:

- 0.47 m (1 ft 7 in) in Bernkastel on 28 July 1921

== History ==
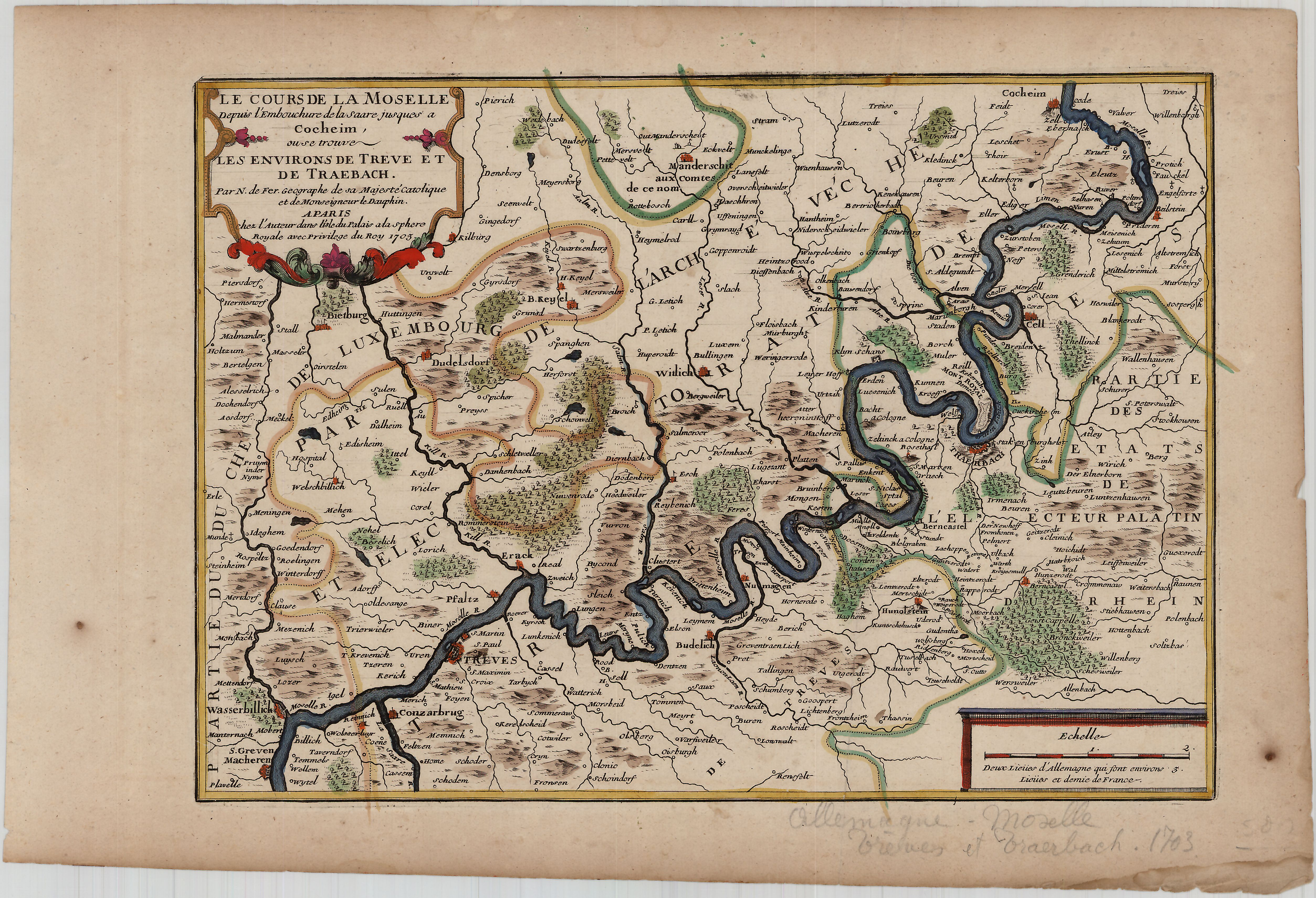
Cours from Grevenmacher to Cochem 1705

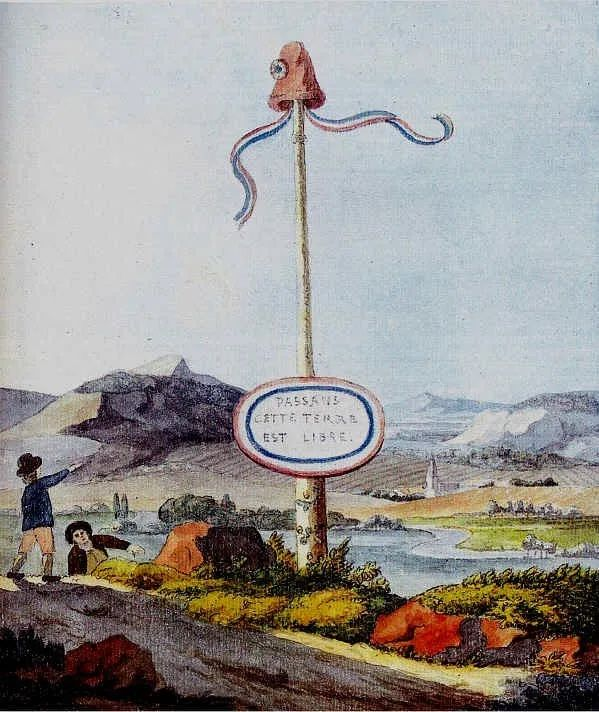
A liberty pole erected by the Moselle during the French Revolution, water colour by Goethe, 1793

The Moselle was known to the Romans by the name of Flumen Musalla (in the Tabula Peutingeriana), and the river was romanticised by the poet Ausonius around 371. Since the division of the medieval Stem Duchy of Lotharingia in the second half of the 10th century, the southern part along the river Moselle (Upper Lotharingia) was often referred to as Mosellania, particularly in the 11th and 12th centuries, and during that time the Duchy of Upper Lorraine itself was also referred to as the Duchy of Mosellanians (Latin: Ducatus Mosellanorum).

From 1815, the Moselle formed the border between the Grand Duchy of Luxembourg and Prussia (German Empire in 1871).

During World War II the Moselle was a barrier as the Allies advanced toward Berlin. In September 1944, the American Third Army in France mounted a drive to cross the Moselle at Dieulouard and split the German forces. Under the orders of Major General Manton S. Eddy, the 80th Infantry Division was given the objective of establishing a bridgehead that would allow Combat Command A (CCA) of the 4th Armored Division to advance into the rear of German forces and encircle the city of Nancy.

On September 13, 1944, the 80th Division launched their assault accompanied by extensive artillery and air support, which helped to suppress the German defenses. The division managed to establish a foothold on the east bank of the river, securing a bridgehead at Dieulouard.

With the bridgehead secured, Combat Command A of the 4th Armored Division crossed the Moselle and advanced towards Nancy, encircling the city and cutting off German supply lines. The 80th Division continued its advance, pushing towards the northeast and engaging in fierce combat with German forces.

The operations to capture Nancy continued until September 15 when the city was liberated by the combined efforts of the 80th Infantry Division and the 4th Armored Division. The successful crossing of the Moselle River and the capture of Nancy dealt a significant blow to German defenses in northeastern France and further contributed to the Allied advance towards Germany.

In the act of 10 April 1952 ratifying the treaty instituted by the ECSC, Article 2 charged the French Government "to initiate, before the establishment of the Common Market, negotiations with the governments concerned in order to achieve a rapid implementation of the canalisation of the Moselle between Thionville and Koblenz.

The River was canalised between Metz and Thionville, via a canal opened in 1964 by the Grand Duchess, Charlotte of Luxembourg, the Federal Chancellor of Germany, Konrad Adenauer and their host, Charles de Gaulle, President of France.

It is on the Moselle, at the site of the France–Germany–Luxembourg tripoint, that the Schengen Agreement was signed in 1985, leading to the abolishment of border controls within the Schengen Area.

== Economy ==
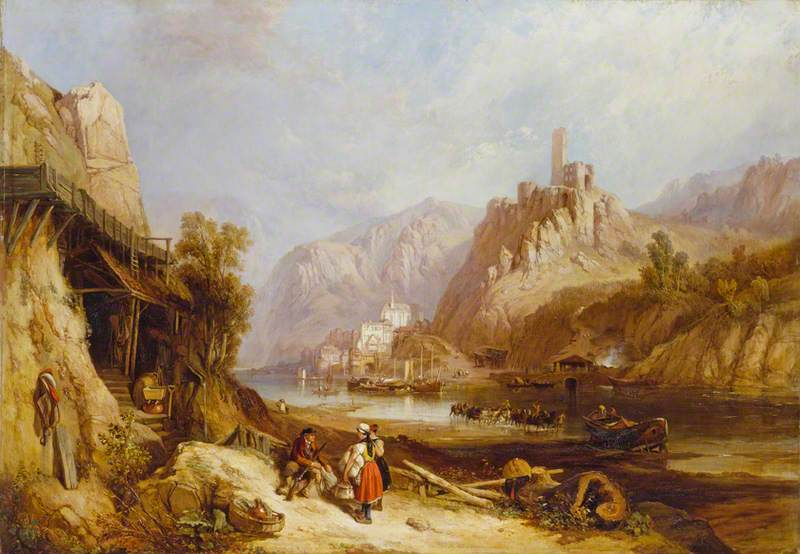
Beilstein on the Moselle by Clarkson Stanfield, 1837

The Moselle valley between Metz and Thionville is an industrial area, with coal mining and steel manufacturers.

The Moselle valley is famous for its scenery and wine. Most well-known is the German Mosel wine region, while the Luxembourg winegrowing region is called Moselle Luxembourgeoise and the French region is called AOC Moselle. Most notable among the wines produced here are Riesling, Elbling, Müller-Thurgau, Kerner, and Auxerrois. The German part of the Moselle is a tourist destination.

=== Navigation ===
After the Second World War, France pressed to be able to ply the Moselle with larger ships in order to link the industrial regions of Lorraine. When, in 1955, the population on the Saar voted to belong to West Germany, France demanded as "compensation" an upgrade of the Moselle. On 27 October 1956 they concluded the Moselle Treaty with Germany and Luxembourg for a canalisation of the Moselle and conceded to Germany in return the extension of the Grand Canal d'Alsace on the Upper Rhine instead of an extension of the canal via Breisach. In 1958 work began and by 26 May 1964 the Moselle could be officially opened from Metz to Koblenz as a major waterway for shipping with 14 locks. France extended it by 1979 as far as Neuves-Maisons. With that, 394 km (245 mi) of the Moselle have been upgraded with a total of 28 locks. In the years 1992 to 1999 the navigable channel was deepened from 2.7 m (8 ft 10 in) to 3.0 m (9 ft 10 in), which enables 1,500-tonne freighters to use the river, a 20% increase in capacity. The channel has a width of 40 m (130 ft), more on the bends. The Moselle Commission, founded in 1962 with its head office in Trier, is responsible for navigation. The Moselle Shipping Police Act which it has produced is valid in all three participant states from Metz to Koblenz.

In 1921 the Moselle (Mo) became a Reich waterway, today it is a federal waterway (Bundeswasserstraße) from Apach at the tripoint to its mouth on the Rhine at kilometre point 592.29 in Koblenz. The waterway is 242 km (150 mi) long and managed by the Trier and Koblenz Water and Shipping Offices (Wasser- und Schifffahrtsämtern Trier und Koblenz). It is categorized as a European waterway of Class Vb. Its kilometrage begins at its mouth at kilometre point 0 and runs upstream. Since 1816 it has formed a 36 km (22 mi) long condominium from Apach, a common Germany–Luxembourg sovereign area with a division of responsibilities set out in a 1976 agreement. The International Moselle Company, initially set up in 1957 to finance the construction of the river's upgrade, manages the shipping charges and the operation and maintenance of the waterway which they are used to fund.

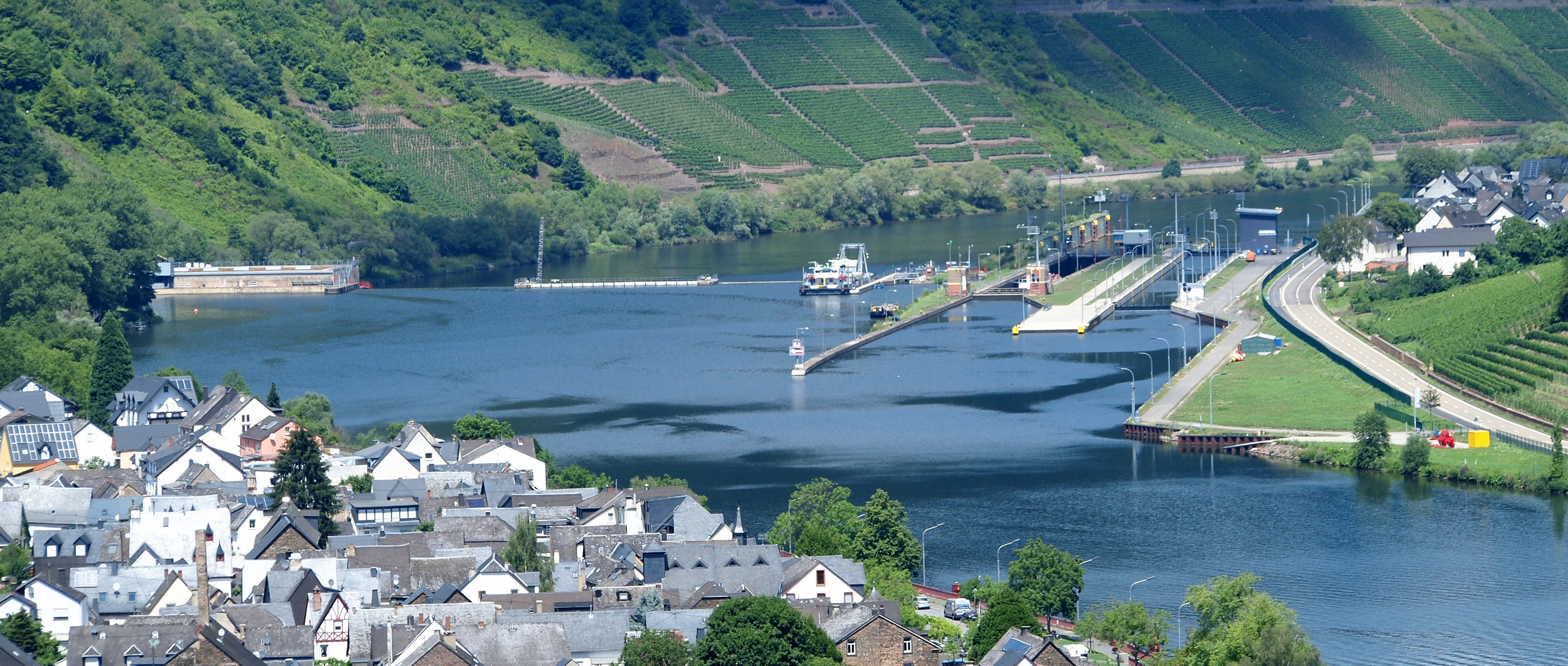
Fankel barrage

Today the Moselle is navigable for large cargo ships up to 110 metres (360 ft) long from the Rhine in Koblenz up to Neuves-Maisons, south of Nancy. For smaller ships it is connected to other parts of France through the Canal de la Meuse and the Canal de la Marne au Rhin. There are locks in Koblenz, Lehmen, Müden, Fankel, Sankt Aldegund, Enkirch, Zeltingen, Wintrich, Detzem, Trier, Grevenmacher, Palzem, Apach, Kœnigsmacker, Thionville, Richemont, Talange, Metz, Ars-sur-Moselle, Pagny-sur-Moselle, Blénod-lès-Pont-à-Mousson, Custines, Pompey, Aingeray, Fontenoy-sur-Moselle, Toul, Villey-le-Sec, and Neuves-Maisons.

By 1970 more than 10 million tonnes of goods were being transported on the Moselle, the majority on towed barges. Upstream freight mainly comprised fuel and ores; downstream the main goods were steel products, gravel and rocks. There is an inland port at Trier, a transshipment site in Zell (Mosel); and there are other ports in Mertert, Thionville, Metz and Frouard. In addition to freighters there are also pleasure boats for tourists between the very busy wine villages and small towns of the Middle and Lower Moselle. There are also yachting or sports marinas in the following places: Koblenz, Winningen, Brodenbach, Burgen, Löf, Hatzenport, Senheim, Treis, Traben-Trarbach, Kues, Neumagen, Pölich, Schweich, Trier and Konz. The Moselle is linked near Toul via the Canal de la Marne au Rhin with inter alia the Meuse, the Saône and the Rhône. Other canals link the river to the North Sea and even the Mediterranean.

=== Locks and dams (weirs) ===
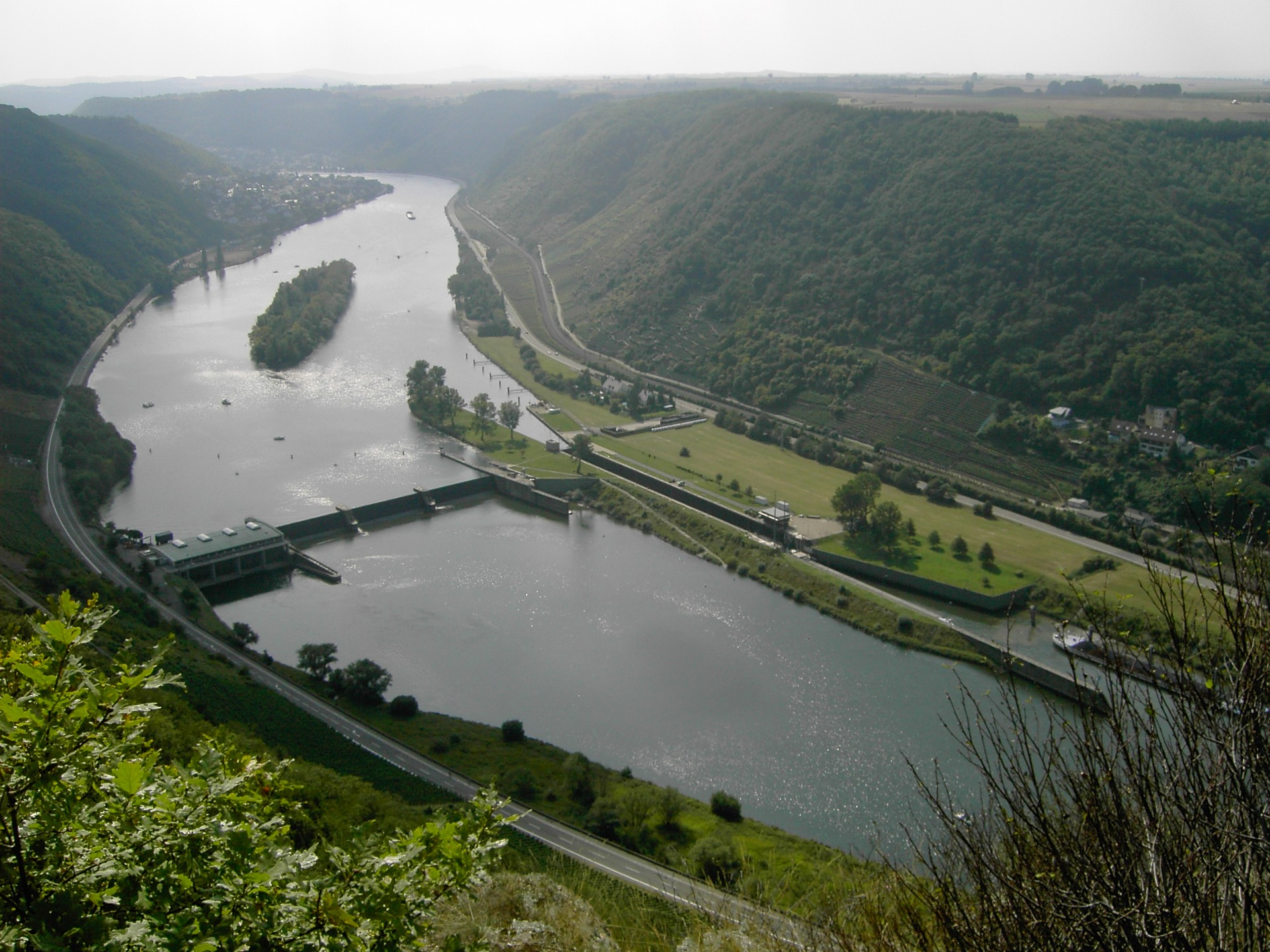
Lehmen Locks

There is a total of 28 changes of level on the Moselle:

- 16 in France near Neuves-Maisons, Villey-le-Sec, Toul, Fontenoy-sur-Moselle, Aingeray, Frouard-Pompey, Custines, Blénod-lès-Pont-à-Mousson, Pagny-sur-Moselle, Ars-sur-Moselle, Metz, Talange, Richemont, Thionville, Kœnigsmacker and Apach
- 2 between Luxembourg and Germany near Stadtbredimus-Palzem and Grevenmacher-Wellen
- 10 in Germany near Trier, Detzem, Wintrich, Zeltingen, Enkirch, St. Aldegund, Fankel, Müden, Lehmen and Koblenz. Detzem is the highest lock – 9 m (30 ft) – and at 29 km (18 mi) the upstream reach is the longest on the river; it is the only lock to be built on a canal of some length excavated outside the river bed.

With the exception of Detzem, all the structures at each change in level are laid-out side by side; the lock is by one riverbank, the weir in the middle and the hydropower plant on the other bank. Between the lock and weir are a boat slipway and channel and boat lock, while between the weir and the power station is the fish ladder. The structures have been blended into the landscape through their low-level design; this was achieved by the choice of sector gates for the weir, vertically lowering upper gates and mitred lower lock gates. The water levels and hydropower works are controlled by the Fankel Central Control Station (Zentralwarte Fankel) of the RWE Power Company at Fankel.

=== Tourism ===
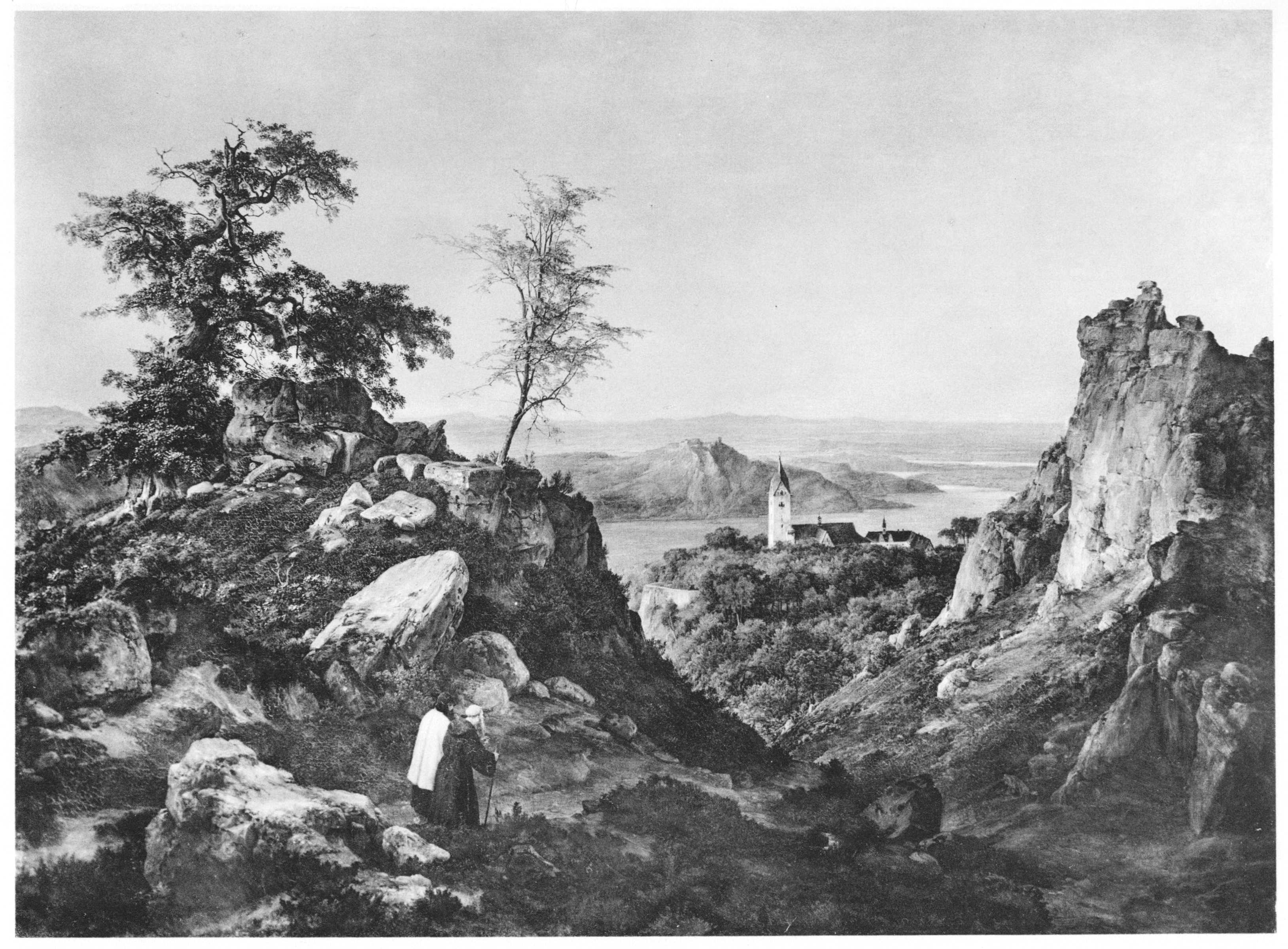
The Moselle landscape, painting by Carl Friedrich Lessing

Through the Moselle valley run the Moselle Wine Route and the Moselle Cycleway, which may be cycled from Metz in France via Trier to Koblenz on the River Rhine, a distance of 311 km (193 mi).

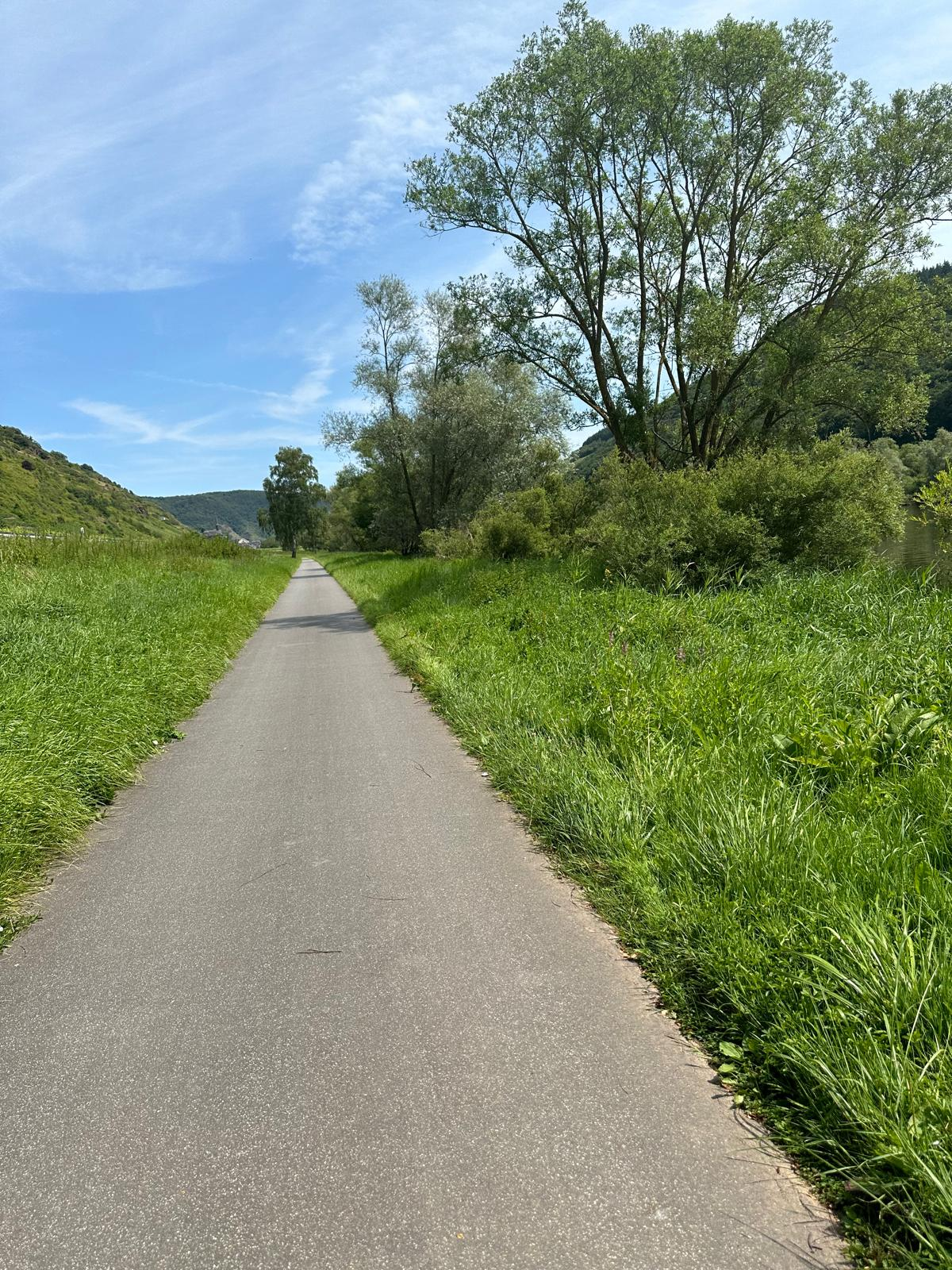
Moselle Cycle Path near Cochem

Between Koblenz and Trier, large sections run on the trackbed of the old Moselle Valley Railway, far from the noise and fumes of motor vehicles. Every year on the Sunday after Pentecost, the 140 km (87 mi) of road between Schweich and Cochem is also car-free as part of Happy Moselle Day.

A number of notable castles and ruins adorn the heights above the Moselle valley and many are visible on a boat trip on the Moselle.

In 1910, a hiking trail, the Moselle Ridgeway, was established which runs for 185 km (115 mi) on the Eifel side and 262 km (163 mi) on the Hunsrück side. Another unusual trail runs from Ediger-Eller via the Calmont Trail to Bremm through the steepest vineyard in Europe.

Before the construction of barrages the Moselle was a popular route for folding kayaks which is why many of the weirs have boat channels. The river is still used today by canoeists, especially during the annual week-long lock closures when no commercial shipping is permitted.

In April 2014 the Moselle Trail was opened, a path running for 365 km (227 mi) from Perl on the Upper Moselle to Koblenz. Numerous Moselle Trail "partner trails", the so-called side branches (Seitensprünge) and "dream paths" (Traumpfade) enhance the hiking network in the Moselle Valley.

The ADAC's Rallye Deutschland has taken place since 2000 in the vineyards along the Moselle at Veldenz, Dhron, Piesport, Minheim, Kesten, Trittenheim, Fell, Ruwertal and Trier.

At Koblenz Locks the Mosellum offers exhibitions about the migration of fish in the Moselle as well as water ecology, navigation and power generation. With the construction of the visitor and information centre the most modern fish ladder along the Moselle was opened.

=== Wine ===
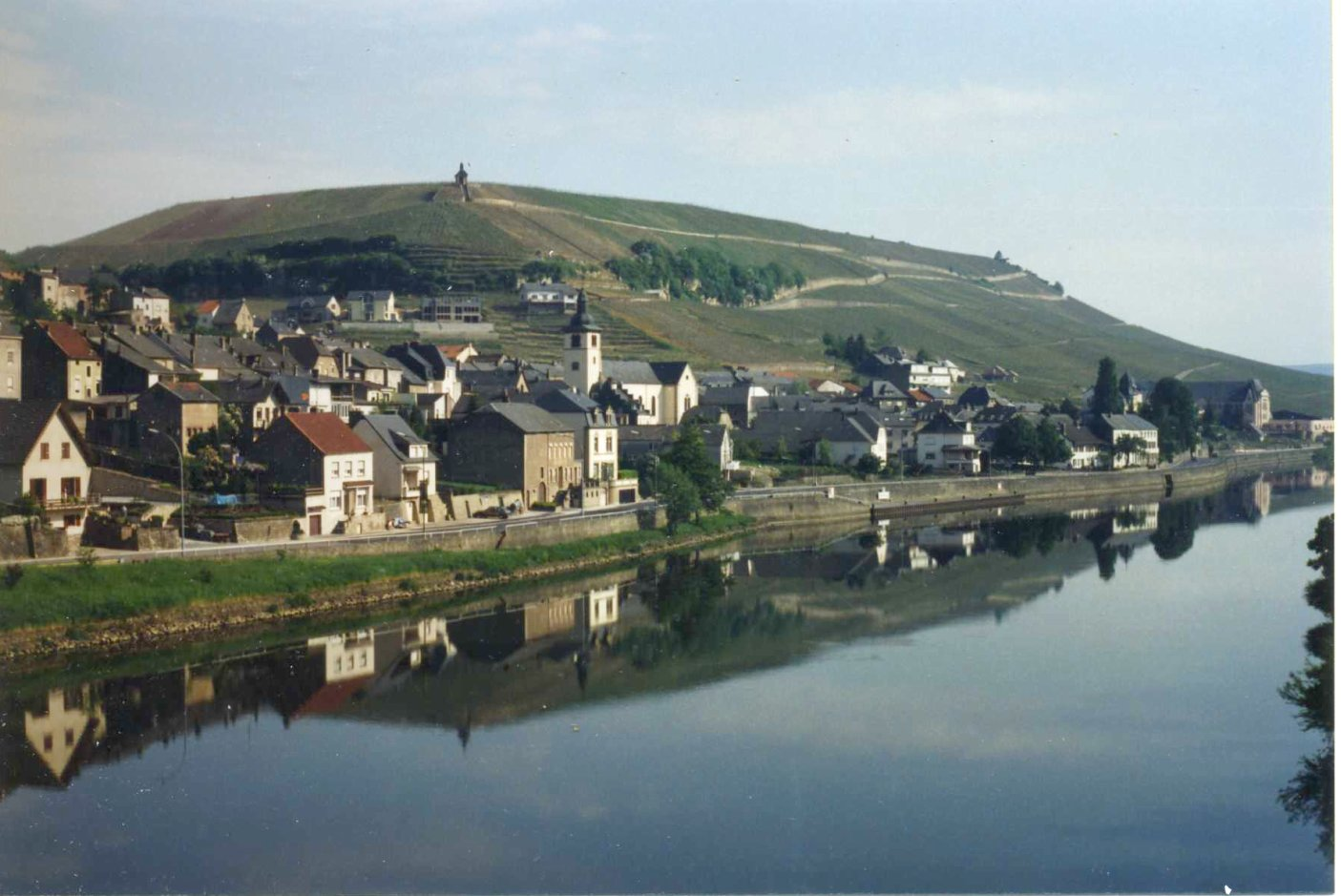
The Moselle in Wormeldange, Luxembourg, vinyards for grape production can be seen on the hill in the background

The Moselle winegrowing region lies along the Moselle with a cultivated area of about 10,540 ha (26,000 acres). The largest part, currently just under 9,000 ha (22,000 acres), is on German soil in the states of Rhineland-Palatinate and Saarland; the Luxembourg part has an area of about 1,300 ha (3,200 acres) (see Wine in Luxembourg). Upstream on the Moselle the vineyards extend into France as far as Seille in the region of Côtes de Moselle with an area of 130 ha (320 acres) and to the region around Toul (Côtes de Toul) covering 110 ha (270 acres).

The German Moselle wine region, including its tributaries, bears the growing and manufacturing name of "Mosel". For marketing reasons the agricultural authorities of the region have divided it into six winegrowing areas. The wine literature and specialist press, by contrast, divide the region into four areas based on geomorphological, micro-climatic and also historical reasons:

Upper Moselle
The valley sides of the Upper Moselle (also called the Burgundy Moselle, Burgundermosel) with their overwhelmingly muschelkalk soils belong geologically to the so-called Paris Basin, which explains its low proportion of Riesling – only around 10% in 2010 – and the increasing cultivation of Pinot Blanc and Pinot Noir grapes.

Trier Region
Around the city of Trier and in the valleys of the Saar and Ruwer with their side valleys, the Riesling is the predominant grape on the shale soils, with over 80% of the crop. One climatic feature of this area is the frequent orientation of often small southwest-southeast facing locations in which the vegetation is exposed to stronger, cooler winds and, especially in the light of recent global warming, often achieve lower degrees of maturity than in the narrow, often deeply incised valley of the Middle and Lower Moselle.

Middle Moselle
With around 6,000 ha (15,000 acres) of vineyard the Middle Moselle is the largest winegrowing area of the Moselle. According to the wine experts and trade, the "greatest" wines of the Moselle, both in quantity and quality, are grown here on land that has been consolidated into large concerns with much vaunted steeply sloped vineyards.

Lower Moselle
In the Lower Moselle Valley, there are a number of medieval castles, high above little villages, decorated with timber-framed houses, surrounded by steep slopes with small terraces in the narrow, winding valley. Here, cultivating vines is very labour-intensive and costly and it is difficult to make it economical. As a result, it is common for vineyards to fall into ruin here.

The wine industry on the German Moselle has been declining for decades. In 2005, statistics showed there were 10,375 ha (25,640 acres) of vineyard; by 2012 this had fallen to just 8,491 ha (20,980 acres). The vineyards that have fallen fallow are mostly those on extremely steep hillsides. There has been a major decline in the number of so-called Nebenerwerbswinzer (vintners for whom it is a secondary occupation), and the small, family farming operations that, until the end of the 1960s formed the majority of wine businesses. Comparative figures by the Chamber of Agriculture for Rhineland-Palatinate for several wine villages on the Lower Moselle show that there were still 797 wine businesses in the early 1960s, but by the early 2000s there were only just under 100.

There has been the opposite trend amongst the established traditional wine estates and more recent vintners with a sound education in oenology and business management, who have increased their business through the reclamation of once renowned, but long forgotten sites. The end of the 20th century saw the rediscovery of the use of special terroir in order to improve quality and value, which has led to a more nuanced view of Moselle wine that, a few years before, had been characterised by overproduction, label scandals and cheap offers.

=== Moselle umbrella brand ===
On 10 November 2006 in Burg, the Moselle Regional Initiative was founded. The introduction of the Moselle as an umbrella brand was based on that of the Eifel region and covers products and services from the areas of agriculture, forestry, tourism, handicrafts and nature.

=== Moselle slate ===
Moselle slate (Moselschiefer) is a manufacturing and trade description for slate from the municipalities of Mayen, Polch, Müllenbach, Trier and its surrounding area. Today only products from the roofing slate mines of Katzenberg in Mayen and Margareta in Polch bear the name Moselle Slate. The name is derived from the historical transport route for this slate along the Moselle to the Lower Rhine.

=== Railways ===
The following railway lines run or ran along the river:

- Koblenz–Trier railway (Moselstrecke), between Koblenz and Bullay, and in Trier, mostly on the left (northern) bank
- Pünderich–Traben-Trarbach railway, for its entire length, on the left (northern) bank
- Moselle Railway, between Bullay and Trier, on the right (southern) bank. Closed in the 1960s.
- Trier West Railway, between Ehrang and Igel, on the left (northern) bank
- Thionville–Trier railway (Obermoselstrecke), for its entire length, on the right (eastern) bank
- CFL line 1a, between Wasserbillig and Grevenmacher, on the left (western) bank. No passenger service remains.
- Metz–Luxembourg railway, between Thionville and Metz, mainly on the left bank
- Lérouville–Metz railway, between Metz and Novéant, mainly on the left bank
- Frouard–Novéant railway, mainly on the left bank
- Paris–Strasbourg railway, between Frouard and Toul
- Blainville-Damelevières–Lure railway, between Bayon and Épinal
- Épinal–Bussang railway, between Épinal and Remiremont, on the left bank

== Moselle in literature ==
The river Mossele features in svereal literary works, such as:

- Mosella, a Latin poem by Ausonius (4th century).
- In the tale, "The Seven Swabians" of the Brothers Grimm, these Swabians drown trying to cross the Moselle.
- Accounts of the river, its folklore and local history appear in Small Boat on the Moselle a 1968 book by Roger Pilkington.

== Castles ==
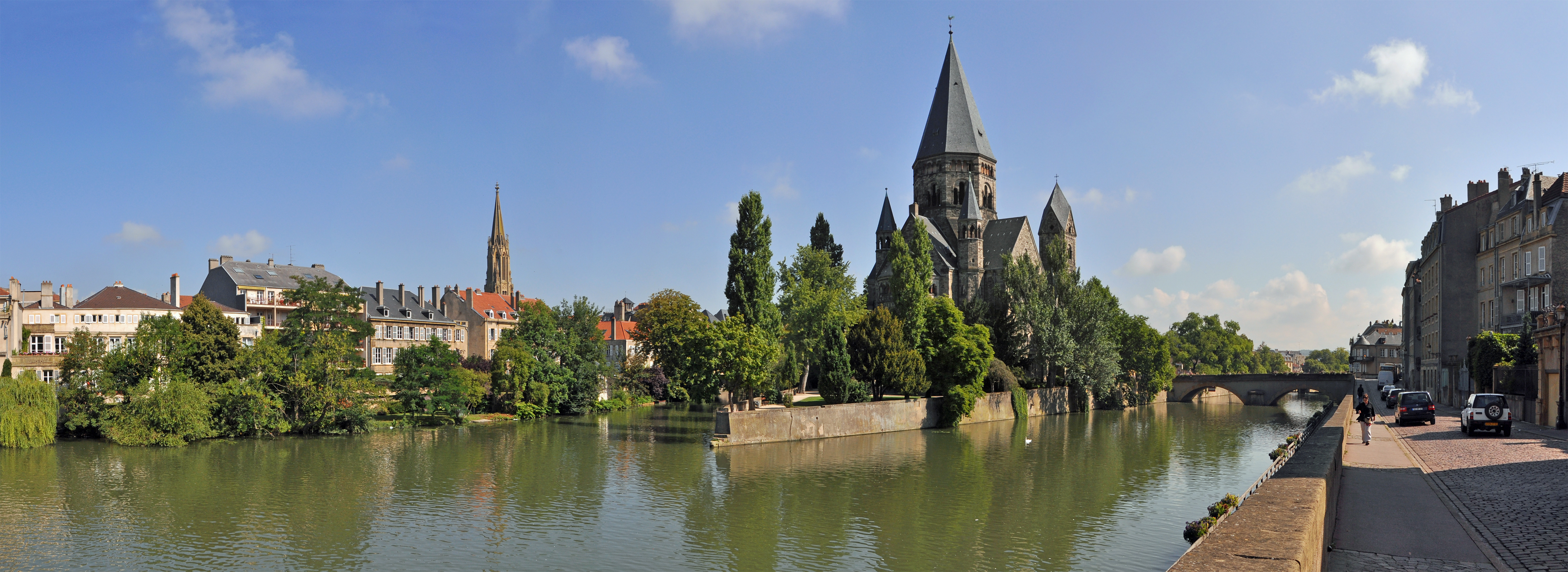
Moselle river flowing through Metz, with the church of Temple Neuf

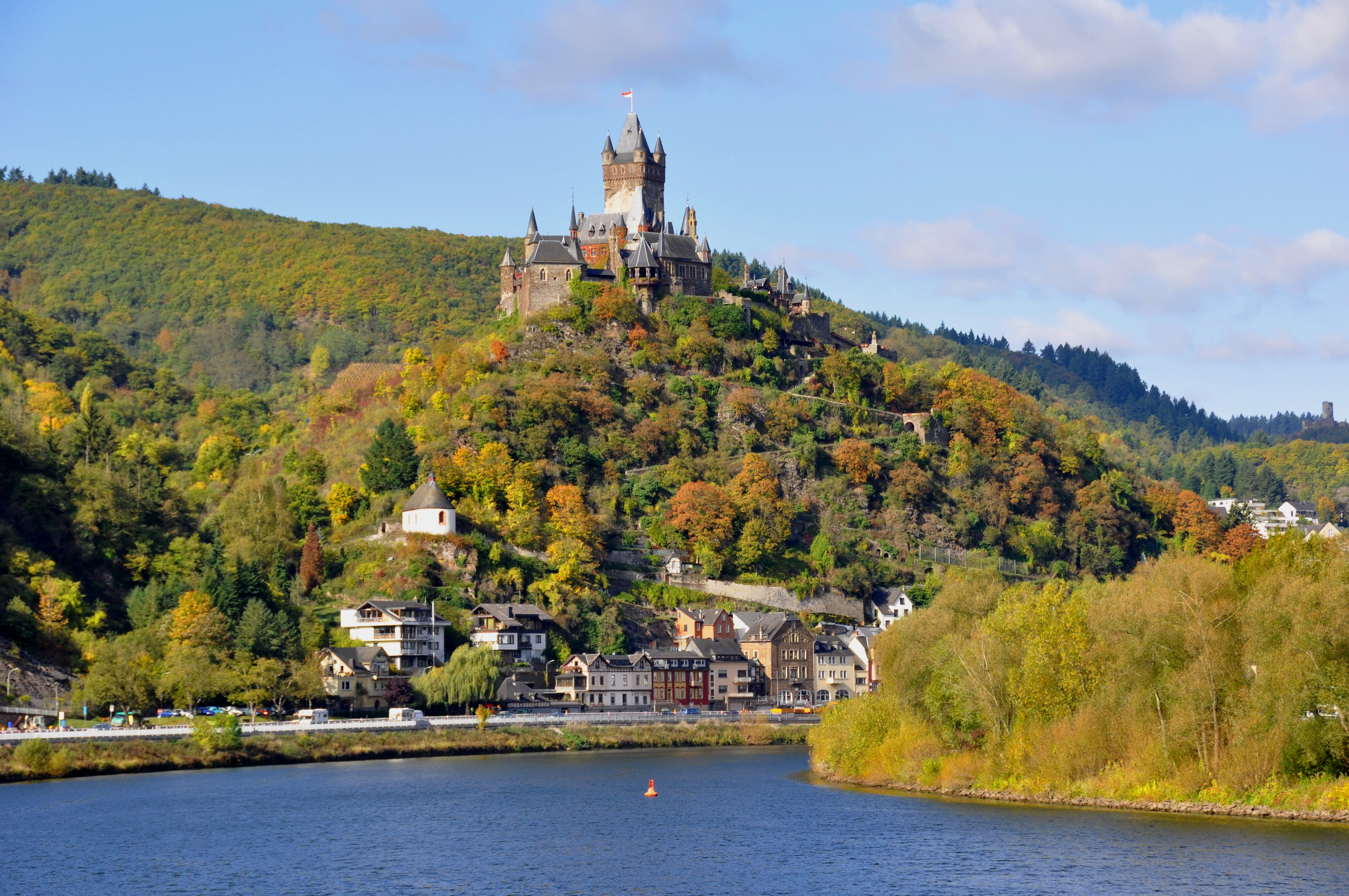
Cochem Castle, overlooking the Mosel

- Château de Meinsberg (dit de Malbrouck): near Manderen, this castle was built in the 15th century but rebuilt in the 1990s. Today it is used for numerous cultural events.
- Château Fort de Sierck-les-Bains: situated just on the French-German border at Sierck-les-Bains, this fortress of the Duke of Lorraine dates back to the 11th century. Most of today's castle was constructed in the 18th century, following plans from Vauban.
- Schloss Berg: a Renaissance castle at Nennig, today a hotel and a casino.
- Alte Burg: a manor house built in 1360 at Longuich. One of the few surviving manor houses in rural Rhineland-Palatinate.
- Schloss Lieser: a palace at Lieser built from 1884 to 1887 in historistic style.
- Landshut Castle: a castle built by the Electorate of Trier in the 13th century at Bernkastel-Kues.
- Grevenburg: ruins of a castle at Traben-Trarbach built by Johann III of Sponheim-Starkenburg about 1350, destroyed, after many sieges, in 1734.
- Marienburg: a 12th-century castle and later monastery near Pünderich and Alf.
- Arras Castle: a 12th-century castle in Alf.
- Metternich Castle: a castle built around 1120 at Beilstein, today partly in ruins.
- Cochem Castle: The castle in Cochem was originally built in the 11th century, but was completely destroyed by French soldiers in 1689. The present castle was rebuilt later in the 19th century.
- Thurant Castle: Above the town of Alken is Thurant Castle, built in the 13th century. It is the only twin-towered castle along the Moselle. The fortress was built by the Count Palatine Henry of the house of Guelph between 1198 and 1206. From 1246 to 1248, it was the two archbishops of Cologne and Trier. Following conquest, it was divided by a partition wall into two halves, each with a keep (tower). During the 19th century, Thurant disintegrated, becoming a ruin; and in 1911 was acquired by Privy Councilor, Dr. Robert Allmers, who had it rebuilt. Since 1973, the castle has been owned by the Allmers and Wulf families.
- Ehrenburg: a 12th-century castle built by the Electorate of Trier at Brodenbach.
- Eltz Castle: The von Eltz family castle, whose history dates back to the 12th century. It remains in private hands to this day but it is open to visitors.
- Lower and Upper Castle, Kobern-Gondorf: two 11th-century castles, today mostly in ruins.
- Pyrmont Castle: This 13th-century castle near Roes was remodelled and extended several times during the Baroque era.
- Bischofstein Castle: Across the river from the municipality of Burgen is this 13th-century castle, which was destroyed during the Nine Years' War, but was reconstructed and now serves as a retreat centre for the Fichte Gymnasium in Krefeld.

== See also ==
- List of rivers of France
- List of rivers of Rhineland-Palatinate

== Bibliography ==
- Decimius Magnus Ausonius: Mosella [Description of a journey by ship on the Moselle around 371 A. D.] http://www.perseus.tufts.edu/hopper/text?doc=Perseus:text:2008.01.0619
- Jakob Hölscher (ed.): Das Moselthal von Trier bis Coblenz. In malerischen Ansichten, nach der Natur gezeichnet von C. Bodmer, in acqua tinta geätzt von R. Bodmer. 30 pages. Koblenz, 1831–1833
- Johann August Klein: Moselthal zwischen Koblenz und Konz, printed by Heriot, Coblenz, 1831
- Johann August Klein: Das Moselthal zwischen Koblenz und Zell mit Städten, Ortschaften, Ritterburgen, historisch, topographisch, malerisch. Heriot, Koblenz, 1831
- Wilhelm Haag: Ausonius und seine Mosella. Gaertner, Berlin, 1900
- Michael Gerhard: Die Mosel, dargestellt in ihrem Lauf, ihrer Entstehung und ihrer Bedeutung für den Menschen. Prüm, 1910. Online edition dilibri Rhineland-Palatinate
- Carl Hauptmann: Die Mosel von Cochem bis Bernkastel. Bonn 1910. Online edition dilibri Rhineland-Palatinate
- Carl Hauptmann: Die Mosel von Coblenz bis Cochem in Wanderbildern. Bonn, 1911. Online edition dilibri Rhineland-Palatinate
- Ludwig Mathar: Die Mosel (Die Rheinlande, Bilder von Land, Volk und Kunst, Zweiter Band: Die Mosel) Cologne o. J. (around 1925), 607 S. (with 117 illustrations and a map of the Moselle Valley from Trier to Coblenz)
- Rudolf G. Binding: Moselfahrt aus Liebeskummer – Novelle einer Landschaft, Frankfurt am Main, 1933 (51.–75. Tausend)
- Josef Adolf Schmoll alias Eisenwerth: Die Mosel von der Quelle bis zum Rhein (Deutsche Lande – Deutsche Kunst). 2nd edition, Munich/Berlin, 1972
- Willy Leson (ed.): Romantische Reise durch das Moseltal-Von Koblenz nach Trier (with graphics by Carl Bodmer and text by Johann August Klein and Christian von Stramberg), Cologne, 1978
- Heinz Cüppers, Gérard Collot, Alfons Kolling, Gérard Thill (Red.): Die Römer an Mosel und Saar (Zeugnisse der Römerzeit in Lothringen, in Luxemburg, im Raum Trier und im Saarland), Mainz, 1983, Zabern: 2nd revised edition (with 46 colour and 346 black and white photographs)
- Heinz Held: Die Mosel von der Mündung bei Koblenz bis zur Quelle in den Vogesen: Landschaft, Kultur, Geschichte (DuMont-Kunst-Reiseführer). 3rd edition, Cologne, 1989
- Jean-Claude Bonnefont, Hubert Collin (dir.), Meurthe-et-Moselle, edition Bonneton, Paris, 1996, 318 pages. ISBN 2-86253-203-7
- Eckoldt M. (ed.), Flüsse und Kanäle, Die Geschichte der deutschen Wasserstraßen, DSV-Verlag, 1998
- Ulrich Nonn: Eine Moselreise im 4. Jahrhundert-Decimus Magnus Ausonius und seine "Mosella". In: Koblenzer Beiträge zur Geschichte und Kultur, Vol. 8, Koblenz: Görres-Verlag 2000, pp. 8–24 (with map and illustrations)
- Pernot, François (2014). "L'Europe «lotharingienne», une idée géopolitique IXe-XXIe siècles". Revue de géographie historique. 4: 3–23.
- Reinhold Schommers: Die Mosel (DuMont-Reise-Taschenbücher). DuMont, Ostfildern 2001, ISBN 3-7701-3741-8
- Ludwin Vogel: Deutschland, Frankreich und die Mosel. Europäische Integrationspolitik in den Montan-Regionen Ruhr, Lothringen, Luxemburg und der Saar. Klartext, Essen, 2001, ISBN 3-89861-003-9
- Decimius Magnus Ausonius: Mosella. Lateinisch-deutsch. Published, translated and commented on by Paul Dräger. Tusculum Studienausgaben. Artemis und Winkler, Düsseldorf, 2004, ISBN 3-7608-1380-1
- Uwe Anhäuser: Die Ausoniusstraße. Ein archäologischer Reise- und Wanderführer. Rhein-Mosel, Alf/Mosel, 2006, ISBN 3-89801-032-5
- Karl-Josef Gilles: Das Moseltal zwischen Koblenz und Trier 1920 bis 1950 (series of archive photographs), Sutton, Erfurt, 2006, ISBN 978-3-89702-943-9.
- Wasser- und Schifffahrtsdirektion Südwest: Kompendium der Wasser- und Schifffahrtsdirektion Südwest. Organisatorische und technische Daten, Binnenschifffahrt, Aufgaben, Wasserstraßen. self-publication, Mainz, June 2007
- Alexander Thon / Stefan Ulrich: Von den Schauern der Vorwelt umweht... Burgen und Schlösser an der Mosel. Schnell + Steiner, Regensburg 2007, 1st edition, 180 pp. numerous photographs, 2 overview maps of the Moselle
- Wolfgang Lambrecht: Malerische Mosel – Gemälde und Druckgraphik aus 100 Jahren, [Farbbroschüre mit Werken u. a. von Carl Bodmer, Clarkson Stanfield, Rowbotham, Compton, Wolfsberger, Benekkenstein, Burger, Thoma, Nonn, Möhren, Zysing und Bayer, published by the Sparkasse Mittelmosel and the Lions-Förderverein Cochem], Cochem, 2007
- Karl-Josef Schäfer und Wolfgang Welter: Ein Jakobsweg von Koblenz-Stolzenfels nach Trier. Der Pilgerwanderführer für den Mosel-Camino. Books on Demand, Norderstedt, 2009 (2nd updated edition) ISBN 978-3-8334-9888-6
- Xavier Deru: Die Römer an Maas und Mosel, Zabern-Verlag, Mainz, 2010
- Groben, Josef: Mosella. Historisch-kulturelle Monographie, Trier, 2011, 311 pp., 237 photographs.
- Stefan Barme: Nacktarsch, Viez und Ledertanga – Ausflüge in die Kulturgeschichte des Mosellandes. Stephan Moll Verlag, 2012 (1st edition) ISBN 978-3-940760-37-1
- Joachim Gruber: Decimus Magnus Ausonius, "Mosella" Kritische Ausgabe, Übersetzung, Kommentar. Walter de Gruyter, Berlin. Series: Texts and commentaries, Vol. 42, 2013, XI, 370 pp.
