= Reference water levels =

River navigation parameters

The reference water levels are used on inland waterways to define a range of water levels allowing the full use of the waterway for navigation. Ship passage can be limited by the water levels that are too low, when the fairway might become too shallow for large ("target", "design") ships, or too high, when it might become impossible for the target ships to pass under the bridges. The goal of establishing the reference water levels is to balance the safety of navigation and economic value of the waterway (for example, increase of the low level shortens the navigation season but allows the use of larger ships). Reference levels are set up based on statistics obtained from the multi-decadal observations (typically 30 years).

== Free-flowing rivers ==
Free-flowing rivers use the low navigable water level (also lowest navigable water level, LNWL) as a low reference water level. When the river is at or above LNWL, the ships of the target draft can use its fairway. LNWL is usually defined as the water level that the river surface stays mostly above at the times when the river is navigable (e. g., during the ice-free season in Europe), so that the river level on average stays below the LNWL only for a fixed small portion of a year. For example, in Europe the limit of time below LNWL is 20 ice-free days per year (e. g., on Rhine) or, alternatively, corresponds to 5–6% of the ice-free period on European rivers (6% on Danube).

The highest navigable water level (HNWL) is defined as a water level that is exceeded for only a few days a year (usually 1%).

== Regulated rivers, canals ==
The low reference level is usually not defined for regulated rivers and canals, as in these cases the depth of the navigation channel is guaranteed by design (sufficient margins are covering the variations of the flow).

The high reference water level (MHW) is sometimes set to accommodate the short-term variations (for example, tidal effects, usually at the levels observed 1% of the time) and the effect of water level changes due to the operation of locks and weirs.

== Equivalent water level ==
In Germany, an equivalent water level (German: Gleichwertiger Wasserstand, GlW) is the value of a stream gauge that corresponds to the nominal fairway depth (ideal minimum channel depth, TuGlW).

== See also ==
- Chart datum
- Vertical datum

== Sources ==
- Muilerman, Gert-Jan; Maierbrugger, Gudrun; Armbrecht, Henrik; Schepper, Karin de; Turf, Sim; Liere, Richard van; Quispel, Martin (2018). Good Navigation Status: guidelines towards achieving a Good Navigation Status. Luxembourg: Publications Office of the European Union. doi:10.2832/148049. ISBN 978-92-79-81043-5.
- UNECE (2017). Inventory of Main Standards and Parameters of the E Waterway Network (Blue Book) (PDF) (3rd ed.). New York and Geneva: United Nations Economic Commission for Europe.
