= Moselle Commission =

Commission that regulates shipping on the Moselle river

- Commission de la Moselle (French); Moselkommission (German)
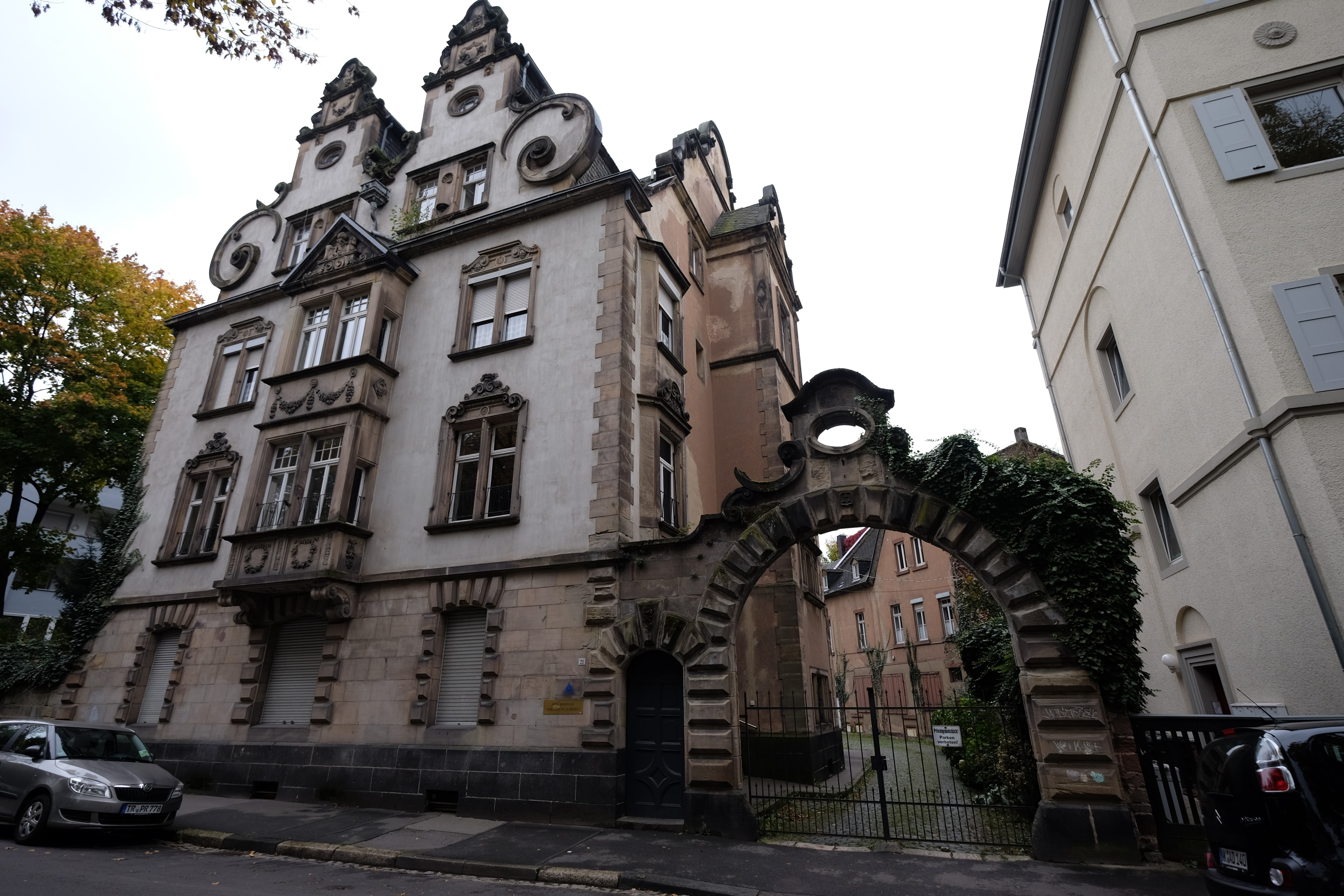
- Seat of the Commission
- Formation: 1962
- Type: IGO
- Purpose: Regulation of shipping on the Moselle
- Headquarters: Trier (Germany)
- Region served: Moselle basin
- Members: Germany, France, Luxembourg
- Website: moselkommission.org

Moselle Commission (originally International Moselle Commission) is an intergovernmental institution established by all three Moselle riparian states (France, Luxembourg, and Germany) to regulate shipping on the Moselle and cooperate in the maintenance of its fairway. Commission consists of 6 members, 2 from each state.

The commission was set up in 1962 (active since December 21) with headquarters in Trier and was instrumental in deepening the fairway from 2.70 meters to 3 meters. The new fairway depth, established in the 1990s, increased the potential load of large ships by 20%.

Commission serves as a lobbyist for the Moselle shipping as well as an originator of rules and safety regulations for the river traffic, most notable being the Moselle Navigation Police Ordinance (German: Moselschifffahrtspolizeiverordnung). It also oversees the river-related construction projects, like locks and bridges and decides on the fairway dues to be paid for using the river for shipping (based on the shipment volume and route). Since Germany had abolished the fairway dues, it is expected that the fees will be eliminated on the entire river; as of 2022 Luxembourg supports the German position to drop the fees, yet France disagrees.

The initial jurisdiction in legal disputes related to shipping on the Moselle lies with the national maritime courts. For an appeal, however, an appeals committee is formed from the judges representing all three riparian states, and the sides can then choose to pursue an appeal either through the Moselle Commission or through the national appellate courts.

== Sources ==
- Schenk, Günter (24 February 2022). "Moselle Commission". Mosel: Mit Nancy, Metz, Trier, Bernkastel-Kues und Koblenz. Trescher Verlag. pp. 21–22. ISBN 978-3-89794-580-7. OCLC 1257412615.
- Cermakian, Jean (15 December 1975). The Moselle: River and Canal from the Roman Empire to the European Economic Community. University of Toronto Press. p. 208. ISBN 978-1-4426-5457-0. OCLC 1100677743.
