= Fontenoy-sur-Moselle =

- Commune
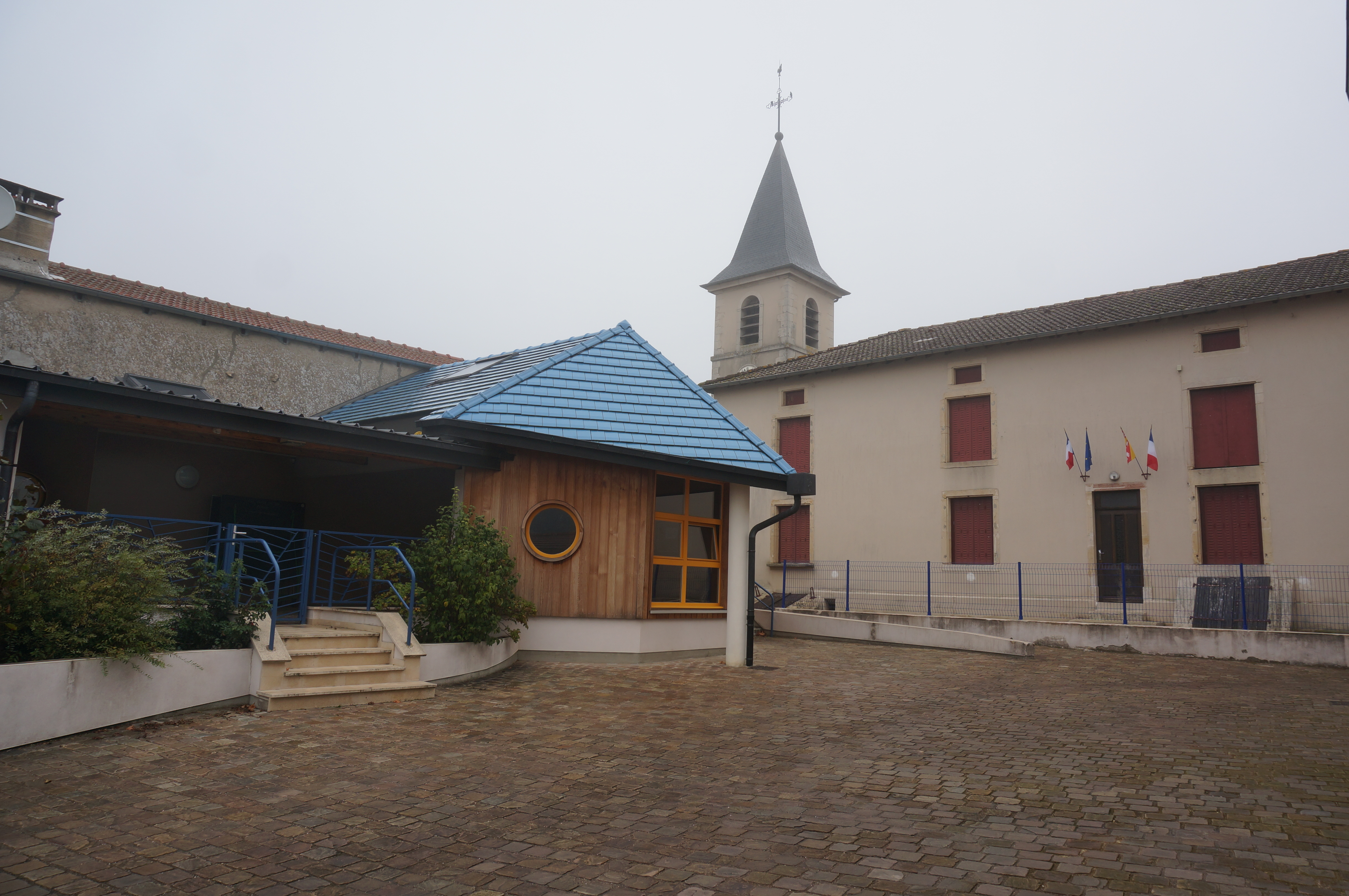
- The town hall and church in Fontenoy-sur-Moselle

- Coat of arms
- Location of Fontenoy-sur-Moselle
- Location within France Location within Grand Est
- Coordinates: 48°42′43″N 5°58′55″E
- Country: France
- Region: Grand Est
- Department: Meurthe-et-Moselle
- Arrondissement: Toul
- Canton: Le Nord-Toulois
- Intercommunality: CC Terres Touloises

Government
  - Mayor (2020–2026): Patricia Winiarski
- Area^{1}: 5.54 km^{2} (2.14 sq mi)
- Elevation: 205 m (673 ft)
- Highest elevation: 264 m (866 ft)
- Lowest elevation: 192 m (630 ft)
- Population (2023): 365
  - Density: 65.9/km^{2} (171/sq mi)
- Time zone: UTC+01:00 (CET)
  - Summer (DST): UTC+02:00 (CEST)
- INSEE/Postal code: 54202 /54840
- ^{1} French Land Register data, which excludes lakes, ponds, glaciers > 1 km^{2} (0.386 sq mi or 247 acres) and river estuaries.

Fontenoy-sur-Moselle (French pronunciation: [fɔ̃tnwa syʁ mɔzɛl], literally Fontenoy on Moselle) is a commune in the Meurthe-et-Moselle department in north-eastern France.

== See also ==
- Communes of the Meurthe-et-Moselle department
