= Minheim =

- Municipality
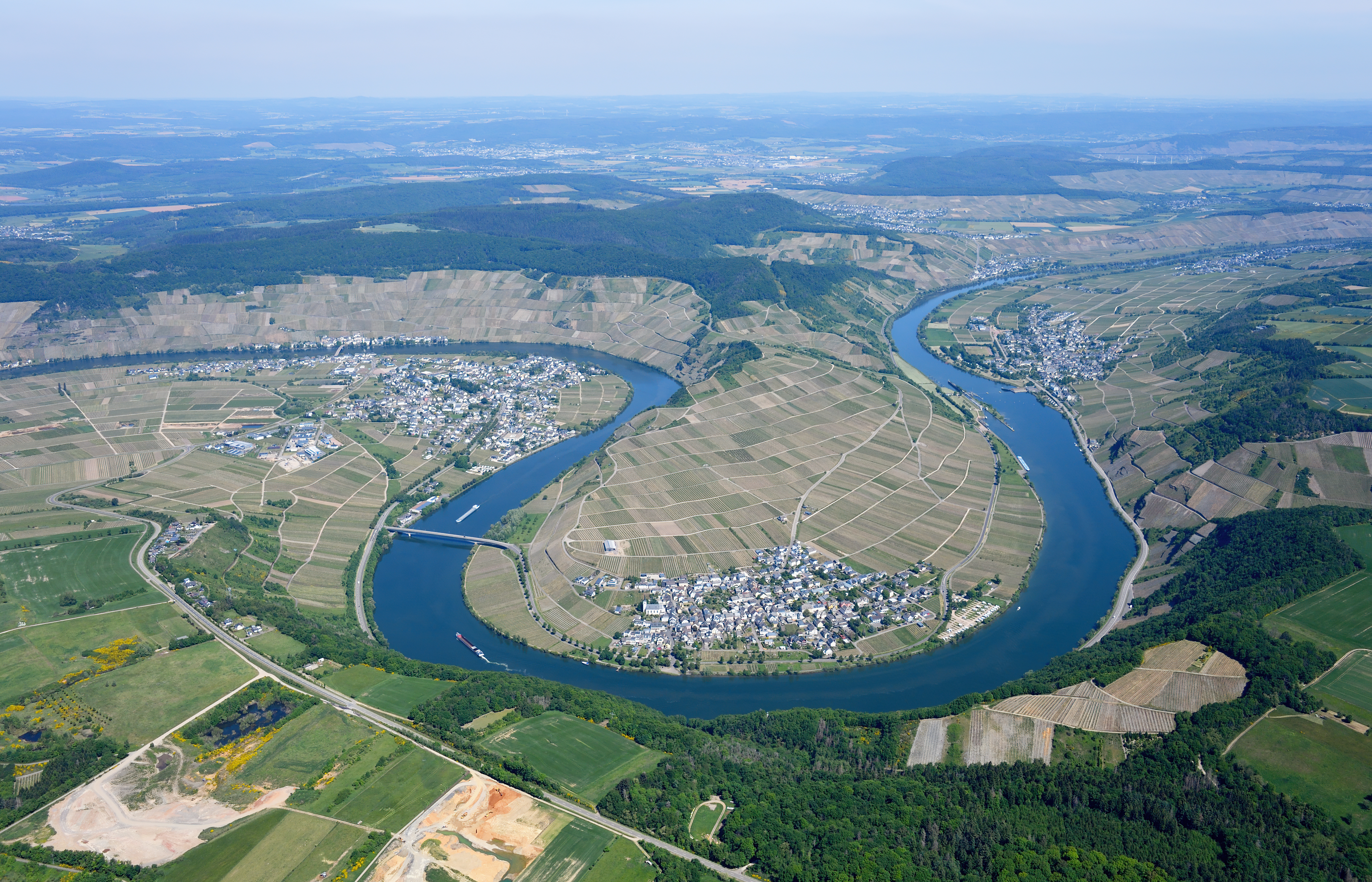
- The peninsula Minheim surrounded by the Moselle river

- Coat of arms

- Location of Minheim within Bernkastel-Wittlich district
- Interactive map of Minheim
- Location within Germany Location within Rhineland-Palatinate
- Coordinates: 49°51′56″N 6°56′11″E
- Country: Germany
- State: Rhineland-Palatinate
- District: Bernkastel-Wittlich
- Municipal assoc.: Bernkastel-Kues

Government
  - Mayor (2019–24): Hans-Peter Scholtes

Area
  - Total: 5.39 km^{2} (2.08 sq mi)
- Elevation: 120 m (390 ft)

Population (2025-12-31)
  - Total: 462
  - Density: 85.7/km^{2} (222/sq mi)
- Time zone: UTC+01:00 (CET)
  - Summer (DST): UTC+02:00 (CEST)
- Postal codes: 54518
- Dialling codes: 06507
- Vehicle registration: WIL
- Website: www.minheim.de

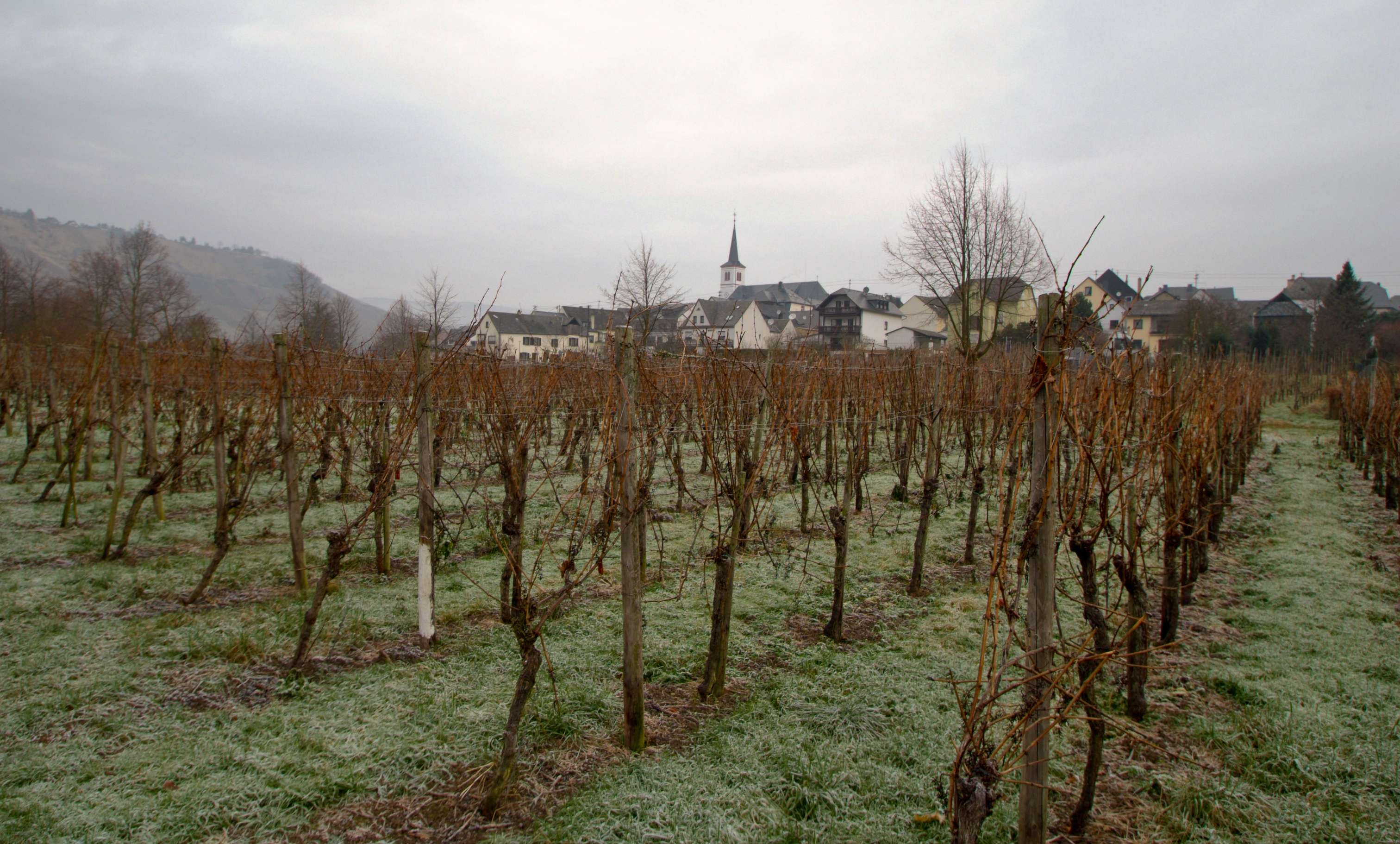
View of Minheim

Minheim is an Ortsgemeinde – a municipality belonging to a Verbandsgemeinde, a kind of collective municipality – in the Bernkastel-Wittlich district in Rhineland-Palatinate, Germany.

== Geography ==
=== Location ===
The municipality lies on the Moselle in the Trier region. Minheim belongs to the Verbandsgemeinde of Bernkastel-Kues, whose seat is in Bernkastel-Kues. The location inside a bend in the Moselle has led to the nickname Sonneninsel Minheim (“Sun Island”), especially in connection with tourism.

=== Neighbouring municipalities ===
Neighbouring municipalities are Kesten and Piesport.

== History ==
The earliest settlement found in the municipal area on the Burglay was a fortified Roman hilltop settlement established at the beginning of the 4th century AD. Archaeological findings show that Roman military personnel stayed there and that the inhabitants were probably Christians. In the middle of the 5th century AD this settlement was destroyed by fire. Minheim's existence as a parish was witnessed as early as 1061. Beginning in 1794, Minheim lay under French rule. In 1814 it was assigned to the Kingdom of Prussia at the Congress of Vienna. Since 1947, it has been part of the then newly founded state of Rhineland-Palatinate.

== Politics ==
=== Municipal council ===
The council is made up of 8 council members, who were elected by proportional representation at the municipal election held on 7 June 2009, and the honorary mayor as chairman.

The municipal election held on 7 June 2009 yielded the following results:

Year	Mertes	Bollig	Total
2009	6	2	8 seats

=== Mayor ===
The mayor is Hans-Peter Scholtes.

== Economy and infrastructure ==
Minheim is one of the biggest winegrowing centres on the Middle Moselle. The municipality's winegrowing locations (Einzellagen) belong to the winemaking appellation – Großlage – of Michelsberg. Moreover, there are many holiday homes, wine parlours and Straußwirtschaften (seasonal wine taverns run by the winemakers themselves and serving their own products). The so-called Sonneninsel has many hiking trails, inviting visitors on cycling tours.

The caravan park opened in 2000 was named “Park of the Year” in 2007 by readers of the mobile home magazine Promobil.

Minheim has at its disposal four inns.

=== Transport ===
On the other side of the Moselle runs Bundesstraße 53, and to the west runs the Autobahn A 1. In each of Salmtal and Wittlich is a railway station on the Koblenz-Trier railway line.
