= Detzem =

- Municipality
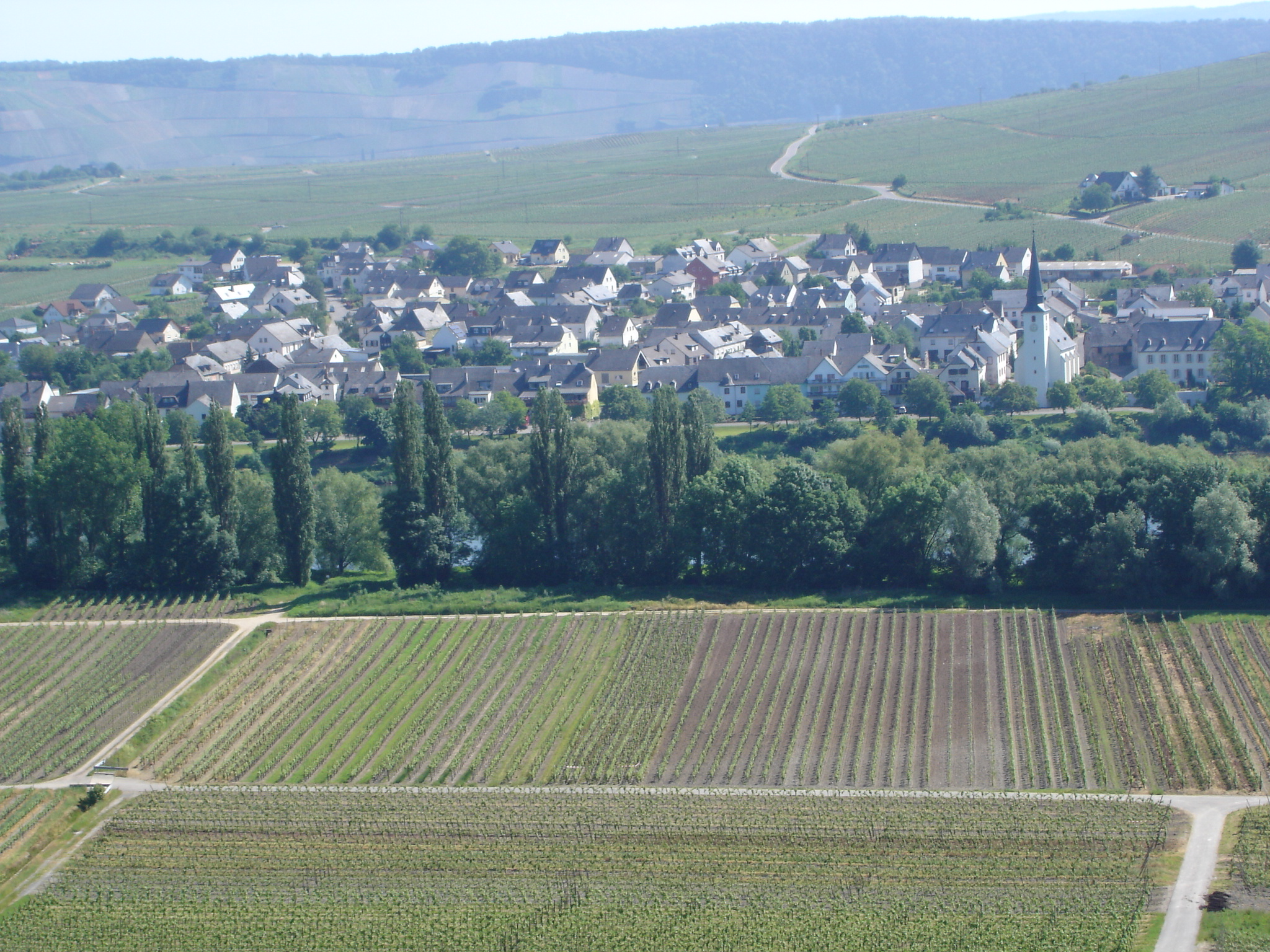

- Coat of arms

- Location of Detzem within Trier-Saarburg district
- Interactive map of Detzem
- Location within Germany Location within Rhineland-Palatinate
- Coordinates: 49°49′23″N 6°50′42″E
- Country: Germany
- State: Rhineland-Palatinate
- District: Trier-Saarburg
- Municipal assoc.: Schweich an der Römischen Weinstraße

Government
  - Mayor (2019–24): Albin Merten (CDU)

Area
  - Total: 5.56 km^{2} (2.15 sq mi)
- Elevation: 125 m (410 ft)

Population (2025-12-31)
  - Total: 601
  - Density: 108/km^{2} (280/sq mi)
- Time zone: UTC+01:00 (CET)
  - Summer (DST): UTC+02:00 (CEST)
- Postal codes: 54340
- Dialling codes: 06507
- Vehicle registration: TR
- Website: Detzem auf der Website der VG Schweich

Detzem is a municipality in the Trier-Saarburg district, in Rhineland-Palatinate, Germany.
