= Navigation season =

In the water transport, the navigation season (or shipping season) is a period of the year during which a waterway is open for navigation. The opening and closing dates of the season are determined annually by the waterway administration to accommodate the weather, water flow and ice conditions as well as the transportation demands. The term is also frequently used to designate number of days per year with easy navigation.

== Terminology ==
In a general sense, in different contexts the term has slightly different meanings, multiple expressions are used (for the Northern Hemisphere):

- summer navigation season;
- winter navigation season with some waterways closed;
- ice-free navigations season / independent navigation period when the ships can get through without the assistance from an icebreaker.

A traditional navigation season naturally varies from оne year to another, a fixed navigation season alternative sets firm dates for opening and closing (that can be changed based on conditions, but only to shorten the period), an extended navigation season utilizes technical means to continue navigation under adverse conditions (e.g., ice).

A navigation window is created by a short controlled release of water from an upstream reservoir to temporarily create a higher river stage for the purpose of navigation.

== History ==
=== Antiquity ===
In Ancient Greece, the navigation period on the Mediterranean Sea lasted while the Pleiades star cluster was visible (May to November). Some interpretations of the Story of Wenamun (Ancient Egypt, circa 1000 BC) and texts from Ugarit (2nd millennium BC) suggest the existence of navigation seasons even earlier.

=== Europe ===
Navigation periods in Europe have a long history. Maritime law of Hanseatic League already in the 13th century stated that the ships must remain in the winter ports after St. Martin's Day (November 11). By the 15th century more detailed laws allowed sailing on the Baltic Sea from Cathedra Petri (February 22) to St. Martin's Day. The season in the North Sea was even shorter, from one Feast of the Cross (Invention of the Cross on May 3) to another (Exaltation of the Cross on September 14).

=== USA ===
Multiple Rivers and Harbors Acts left the administration of navigation on the major US waterways, including the commencement and closing of the navigation season, to the U.S. Army Corps of Engineers (USACE).

== Sources ==
- Pastusiak, Tadeusz (6 August 2016). The Northern Sea Route as a Shipping Lane: Expectations and Reality. Springer. ISBN 978-3-319-41834-6. OCLC 1008644453.
- Kreem, Juhan (15 October 2011). "Seasonal isolation in the communication in Livonia". Isolated Islands in Medieval Nature, Culture and Mind. Central European University Press. pp. 120–127. doi:10.1515/9786155053252-012. ISBN 9786155053252.
- Benedictow, Ole Jørgen (19 December 2016). The Black Death and Later Plague Epidemics in the Scandinavian Countries:: Perspectives and Controversies. Walter de Gruyter GmbH & Co KG. p. 118. ISBN 9788376560472. OCLC 1019988555.
- USACE, United States Army Corps of Engineers. Detroit District (1979). Survey Study for Great Lakes and St. Lawrence Seaway Navigation Season Extension: Draft, Volume 1. U.S. Army Engineer District, Detroit, Corps of Engineers. OCLC 10320207.
- Department of Transportation and Related Agencies Appropriations for Fiscal Year 1994: Hearings Before a Subcommittee of the Committee on Appropriations, United States Senate, One Hundred Third Congress, First Session, on H.R. 2490/2750 ... Department of Transportation and Related Agencies Appropriations for Fiscal Year 1994: Hearings Before a Subcommittee of the Committee on Appropriations, United States Senate, One Hundred Third Congress, First Session, on H.R. 2490/2750. U.S. Government Printing Office. 1994. ISBN 978-0-16-043665-9.
- The Marine Transportation System and the Federal Role: Measuring Performance, Targeting Improvement. Special report (National Research Council (U.S.). Transportation Research Board). Transportation Research Board. 2004. ISBN 978-0-309-09452-8.
- Jones, William K. (April 11–12, 1995). Hatcher, Kathryn J. (ed.). "Effect of Navigation Windows on Salinity in the Apalachicola, Florida" (PDF). Proceedings of the 1995 Georgia Water Resources Conference. Athens, Georgia: The University of Georgia.
- Sauvage, Caroline (January 2008). "Trade and Exchanges in the Late Bronze Age: an Adaptation to the Environmental Milieu". Proceedings of the 4th ICANE 29 March – 3 April 2004. 1. Wiesbaden: Harrassowitz Verlag: 207–218. ISBN 9783447057035.
