= Brinkman =

Brinkman, Brinkmann, Brinckman, and Brinckmann are variations of a German and Dutch surname. It is toponymic surname with the same meaning as the surname Van den Brink: "(man) from the village green". Notable people with these surnames include:

== Brinkman ==
- Austin Brinkman (born 2002), American football player
- Baba Brinkman (born 1978), Canadian rapper and playwright
- Bert Brinkman (born 1968), Dutch water polo player
- Bo Brinkman (born 1956), American actor, director, and producer
- Bryan Brinkman (fl. 2009), American cartoon animator
- Carl Gustaf von Brinkman (1764–1847), Swedish-German classicist poet, writer and diplomat
- Charles Brinkman (1928–2003), American figure skater
- Cookie Brinkman (1949–2019), American football player
- Chuck Brinkman (born 1944), American baseball player
- Curt Brinkman (1953–2010), American wheelchair racer
- Ed Brinkman (1941–2008), American baseball player
- Elco Brinkman (born 1948), Dutch politician
- Erna Brinkman (born 1972), Dutch volleyball player
- Fiona Brinkman (born 1967), Australian-born Canadian bioinformatician
- Fred Brinkman (1892–1961), American architect
- George Brinkman (born 1972), American spree killer
- Henri Brinkman (1908–1961), Dutch mathematician and physicist, namesake of the Brinkman number
- Henry W. Brinkman (1881–1949), American architect
- Hero Brinkman (born 1964), Dutch politician
- Jacques Brinkman (born 1966), Dutch field hockey player
- Joe Brinkman (born 1944), American baseball umpire
- Johannes Brinkman (1902–1949), Dutch architect
- Kiara Brinkman (born 1979), American author
- Lilani Brinkman (born 1985), Namibian politician
- Lloyd Donald Brinkman (1929–2015), American businessman, cattle breeder, civic leader, and art collector
- Lutz Brinkmann (born 1975), German politician (CDU)
- Mary A. Brinkman (1846–1932), American homeopathic physician
- Mat Brinkman (born 1973), American artist and musician
- Michiel Brinkman (1873–1925) Dutch architect
- Steven Brinkman (born 1979), Canadian volleyball player
- Tim Brinkman (born 1997), Dutch footballer
- Tom Brinkman (born 1957), American (Ohio) politician

== Brinckman ==
- The Brinckman baronets
  - Sir Theodore Brinckman, 1st Baronet (1798–1880), British MP for Yarmouth
  - Sir Theodore Brinckman, 2nd Baronet (1830–1905), his son, British Liberal MP for Canterbury
  - Sir Theodore Brinckman, 4th Baronet (1898–1954), British cricketer

== Brinkmann ==
- Ansgar Brinkmann (born 1969), German footballer
- Bernd Brinkmann (born 1939), German forensic pathologist
- Bernhard Brinkmann (1952–2022), German politician
- Beth Brinkmann (born 1958), American lawyer
- Carl Brinkmann (1885–1954), German sociologist and economist
- Christiane Brinkmann (born 1962), German athlete
- Daniel Brinkmann (born 1986), German footballer
- Dennis Brinkmann (born 1978), German football defender and coach
- Dirk Brinkmann (born 1964), German field hockey player
- Gunnar Brinkmann, discoverer of the Brinkmann graph
- Hanne Brinkmann (1895–1984), German actress
- Hans Brinkmann, discoverer of Brinkmann coordinates
- Helmuth Brinkmann (1895–1983), German navy vice-admiral
- Julio Brinkmann (1839–1895), the namesake of Brinkmann, Córdoba in Argentina
- Lutz Brinkmann (born 1975), German politician
- Patrik Brinkmann (born 1966), Swedish-German businessman and right-wing politician
- Philipp Brinkmann, German-Greek entrepreneur
- Rainer Brinkmann (admiral) (born 1958), German Navy admiral
- Rainer Brinkmann (politician) (born 1958), German SPD politician
- Reinhold Brinkmann (1934–2010), German musicologist
- Rolf Dieter Brinkmann (1940–1975), German lyricist and storyteller
- Ron Brinkmann (born 1964), American (?) visual effects supervisor
- Rudolf Brinkmann (Secretary of State) (1893–1973), German economist
- Ruth Brinkmann (1937–1997), American-born Austrian stage actress
- Svend Brinkmann (born 1975), Danish psychologist
- Thomas Brinkmann (born 1959), German musician, also known as Ester Brinkmann
- Thomas Brinkmann (field hockey) (born 1968), German field hockey player
- Till Brinkmann (born 1995), German footballer
- Vinzenz Brinkmann (born 1958), German classical archaeologist
- Werner Brinkmann (born 1946), German jurist and chief executive
- Wilhelm Brinkmann (1910–1991), German field handball player
- William J. Brinkmann (1874–1911), American architect
- Woldemar Brinkmann (1890–1959), German architect and interior designer
- Wolfgang Brinkmann (born 1950), German equestrian

== Brinckmann ==
- Alfred Brinckmann (1891–1967), German chess master
- Henriette Hahn-Brinckmann (1862–1934), Danish-German painter and lithographer
- Justus Brinckmann (1843–1915), German museum director
- Karl Gustav von Brinckmann (1764–1847), Swedish-German poet, writer and diplomat
- Philipp Hieronymus Brinckmann (1709–1761), German painter and engraver
