= Lieser =

Lieser may refer to:

- Clemens Freiherr von Schorlemer-Lieser (1856–1922), German politician
- Lieser, Germany, a village in Rhineland-Palatinate, Germany
- Schloss Lieser, a castle in the village of Lieser, Germany
- Lieser (Drava), a river of Carinthia, Austria, tributary of the Drava
- Lieser (Moselle), a river of Rhineland-Palatinate, Germany, left tributary of the Moselle
