= Schorlemer =

Schorlemer is a surname. Notable people with the surname include:

- Burghard Freiherr von Schorlemer-Alst (1825–1895), German politician
- Clemens Freiherr von Schorlemer-Lieser (1856–1922), German politician
- Karl Friedrich Freiherr von Schorlemer (1886–1936), German lawyer, politician and landowner
- Reinhard von Schorlemer (born 1938), German politician, farmer, and landowner

== See also ==
- Schorlemmer
