= Osnabrück-Land =

Federal electoral district of Germany

38 Osnabrück-Land
- Electoral district for the Bundestag
- Osnabrück-Land in 2025
- State: Lower Saxony
- Population: 265,000 (2019)
- Electorate: 199,960 (2021)
- Major settlements: Melle; Bramsche
- Area: 1,916.3 km^{2}

Current electoral district
- Created: 1980
- Party: CDU
- Member: Lutz Brinkmann
- Elected: 2025

Osnabrück-Land is an electoral constituency (German: Wahlkreis) represented in the Bundestag. It elects one member via first-past-the-post voting. Under the current constituency numbering system, it is designated as constituency 38. It is located in western Lower Saxony, comprising most of the district of Osnabrück.

Osnabrück-Land was created for the 1980 federal election. Since 2013 to 2025, it has been represented by André Berghegger of the Christian Democratic Union (CDU). Since 2025 it is represented by Lutz Brinkmann of the Christian Democratic Union of Germany.

== Geography ==
Osnabrück-Land is located in western Lower Saxony. As of the 2021 federal election, it comprises the entirety of the Osnabrück district with the exception of the municipalities of Belm, Georgsmarienhütte, Hagen am Teutoburger Wald, Hasbergen, and Wallenhorst.

== History ==
Osnabrück-Land was created in 1980 and contained parts of the abolished constituencies of Lingen, Osnabrück, and Nienburg. Until 1998, it was constituency 32 in the number system. In the 2002 and 2005 election, it was constituency 38. In the 2009 election, it was constituency 39. It has been constituency 38 since the 2013 election. Its borders have not changed since its creation.

== Members ==
The constituency has been held by the Christian Democratic Union (CDU) since its creation. Its first representative was Reinhard von Schorlemer, who served from 1980 to 2002. He was succeeded by Georg Schirmbeck, who served until 2013. André Berghegger has been representative since the 2013 election.

Election	Member	Party	%
1980	Reinhard von Schorlemer	CDU	47.1
1983	Reinhard von Schorlemer	CDU	54.5
1987	Reinhard von Schorlemer	CDU	49.4
1990	Reinhard von Schorlemer	CDU	51.1
1994	Reinhard von Schorlemer	CDU	50.8
1998	Reinhard von Schorlemer	CDU	45.9
2002	Georg Schirmbeck	CDU	45.6
2005	Georg Schirmbeck	CDU	43.8
2009	Georg Schirmbeck	CDU	44.2
2013	André Berghegger	CDU	53.1
2017	André Berghegger	CDU	45.6
2021	André Berghegger	CDU	36.2
2025	Lutz Brinkmann	CDU	36.6

== Election results ==
=== 2025 election ===
Federal election (2025): Osnabrück-Land
Notes:	Blue background denotes the winner of the electorate vote. Pink background denotes a candidate elected from their party list. Yellow background denotes an electorate win by a list member, or other incumbent. A ✓ or ✗ denotes status of any incumbent, win or lose respectively.						
Party	Candidate	Votes	%	±%	Party votes	%	±%
CDU	Lutz Brinkmann	60,954	36.6	▲0.4	53,514	32.1	▲3.6
SPD	Anke Hennig	40,394	24.2	▼5.4	37,108	22.2	▼9.9
AfD	Marcel Queckemeyer	29,983	18.0	▲11.7	30,206	18.1	▲11.4
Greens	Filiz Polat	16,759	10.1	▼4.6	16,444	9.9	▼4.9
Left	Erik Frerker	9,516	5.7	▲3.3	10,900	6.5	▲4.0
FDP	Lutz Haunhorst	4,914	2.9	▼5.7	7,189	4.3	▼6.8
BSW					6,161	3.7	
Tierschutzpartei					1,509	0.9	0.0
FW	Sascha Wahnschaffe	2,850	1.7	▲0.9	1,477	0.9	▲0.3
Volt	Emine Tunç	1,239	0.7		702	0.4	▲0.3
PARTEI					630	0.4	▼0.3
dieBasis					481	0.3	▼0.9
Pirates					247	0.1	▼0.1
BD					195	0.1	
Humanists					99	0.1	0.0
MLPD					35	0.0	0.0
Informal votes		1,132			844		
Total valid votes		166,609			166,897		
Turnout		167,741	84.1	▲8.2			
CDU hold	Majority	20,560	12.4	▲5.9			

=== 2021 election ===
Federal election (2021): Osnabrück-Land
Notes:	Blue background denotes the winner of the electorate vote. Pink background denotes a candidate elected from their party list. Yellow background denotes an electorate win by a list member, or other incumbent. A ✓ or ✗ denotes status of any incumbent, win or lose respectively.						
Party	Candidate	Votes	%	±%	Party votes	%	±%
CDU	✓ André Berghegger	54,535	36.2	▼9.3	42,864	28.5	▼11.9
SPD	Anke Hennig	44,709	29.7	▲1.4	48,352	32.1	▲6.5
Greens	Filiz Polat	22,011	14.6	▲6.9	22,160	14.7	▲6.5
FDP	Matthias Seestern-Pauly	13,006	8.6	▲2.3	16,653	11.1	▲1.3
AfD	Roland Lapinskas	9,418	6.3	▼0.4	10,069	6.7	▼0.6
Left	Swen Adams	3,596	2.4	▼2.9	3,870	2.6	▼3.5
dieBasis	Jürgen Wehlburg	2,049	1.4		1,760	1.2	
Tierschutzpartei					1,397	0.9	▲0.3
PARTEI					1,090	0.7	▲0.1
FW	Josef Vagedes	1,262	0.8		824	0.5	▲0.3
Pirates					403	0.3	▼0.1
Team Todenhöfer					300	0.2	
Volt					207	0.1	
NPD					123	0.1	▼0.1
ÖDP					88	0.1	0.0
Humanists					89	0.1	
V-Partei3					85	0.1	0.0
du.					65	0.0	
DKP					31	0.0	0.0
LKR					16	0.0	
MLPD					12	0.0	0.0
Informal votes		1,251			1,379		
Total valid votes		150,586			150,458		
Turnout		151,837	76.9	0.0			
CDU hold	Majority	9,826	6.5	▼10.8			

=== 2017 election ===
Federal election (2017): Osnabrück-Land
Notes:	Blue background denotes the winner of the electorate vote. Pink background denotes a candidate elected from their party list. Yellow background denotes an electorate win by a list member, or other incumbent. A ✓ or ✗ denotes status of any incumbent, win or lose respectively.						
Party	Candidate	Votes	%	±%	Party votes	%	±%
CDU	✓ André Berghegger	68,379	45.6	▼7.5	60,737	40.4	▼7.5
SPD	Rainer Spiering	42,438	28.3	▼4.0	38,529	25.7	▼3.7
Greens	Filiz Polat	11,613	7.7	▲1.9	12,346	8.2	▲0.5
AfD	Waldemar Herdt	9,934	6.6		10,940	7.3	▲4.5
FDP	Matthias Seestern-Pauly	9,576	6.4	▲4.6	14,603	9.7	▲5.1
Left	Josef Riepe	7,908	5.3	▲1.7	9,156	6.1	▲2.1
Tierschutzpartei					958	0.6	▲0.1
PARTEI					902	0.6	
Pirates					490	0.3	▼1.2
FW					381	0.3	▼0.1
NPD					322	0.2	▼0.5
BGE					205	0.1	
DM					168	0.1	
V-Partei³					151	0.1	
DiB					140	0.1	
ÖDP					119	0.1	
DKP					29	0.0	
MLPD					19	0.0	0.0
Informal votes		1,226			1,107		
Total valid votes		150,076			150,195		
Turnout		151,302	76.0	▲2.6			
CDU hold	Majority	25,941	17.3	▼3.5			

=== 2013 election ===
Federal election (2013): Osnabrück-Land
Notes:	Blue background denotes the winner of the electorate vote. Pink background denotes a candidate elected from their party list. Yellow background denotes an electorate win by a list member, or other incumbent. A ✓ or ✗ denotes status of any incumbent, win or lose respectively.						
Party	Candidate	Votes	%	±%	Party votes	%	±%
CDU	André Berghegger	76,179	53.1	▲8.9	68,972	48.0	▲9.2
SPD	Rainer Spiering	46,365	32.3	▲0.1	42,214	29.4	▲2.9
Greens	Florian Zimmeck	8,330	5.8	▼1.5	11,046	7.7	▼1.5
Left	Bernhard Rohe	5,162	3.6	▼2.7	5,783	4.0	▼3.1
FDP	Matthias Seestern-Pauly	2,546	1.8	▼7.3	6,599	4.6	▼10.1
AfD					4,060	2.8	
Pirates	Katharina Nocun	2,526	1.8		2,188	1.5	▼0.1
NPD	Dirk Heimsoth	1,135	0.8	▼0.2	968	0.7	▼0.2
FW	Jörg Grunert	816	0.6		478	0.3	
Tierschutzpartei					801	0.6	0.0
PBC	Anton Fischer	404	0.3		444	0.3	
PRO					121	0.1	
REP					36	0.0	
MLPD					23	0.0	0.0
Informal votes		1,390			1,120		
Total valid votes		143,463			143,733		
Turnout		144,853	73.3	0.0			
CDU hold	Majority	29,814	20.8	▲8.8			

=== 2009 election ===
Federal election (2009): Osnabrück-Land
Notes:	Blue background denotes the winner of the electorate vote. Pink background denotes a candidate elected from their party list. Yellow background denotes an electorate win by a list member, or other incumbent. A ✓ or ✗ denotes status of any incumbent, win or lose respectively.						
Party	Candidate	Votes	%	±%	Party votes	%	±%
CDU	✓ Georg Schirmbeck	63,175	44.2	▼2.6	55,599	38.8	▼1.8
SPD	Rainer Spiering	46,028	32.2	▼8.3	37,936	26.5	▼10.9
FDP	Matthias Seestern-Pauly	12,940	9.1	▲4.7	21,117	14.7	▲4.7
Greens	Arnulf Nüßlein	10,393	7.3	▲2.8	13,227	9.2	▲2.6
Left	Manfred Brauner	9,006	6.3	▲3.5	10,211	7.1	▲3.8
Pirates					2,268	1.6	
NPD	Dirk Heimsoth	1,382	1.0	0.0	1,243	0.9	▼0.1
Tierschutzpartei					854	0.6	▲0.1
RRP					486	0.3	
ÖDP					190	0.1	
DVU					120	0.1	
MLPD					26	0.0	0.0
Informal votes		1,706			1,353		
Total valid votes		142,924			143,277		
Turnout		144,630	73.4	▼6.1			
CDU hold	Majority	17,147	12.0	▲5.7			

=== 2005 election ===
Federal election (2005):Osnabrück-Land
Notes:	Blue background denotes the winner of the electorate vote. Pink background denotes a candidate elected from their party list. Yellow background denotes an electorate win by a list member, or other incumbent. A ✓ or ✗ denotes status of any incumbent, win or lose respectively.						
Party	Candidate	Votes	%	±%	Party votes	%	±%
CDU	✓ Georg Schirmbeck	71,536	46.8	▲1.2	62,100	40.6	▼2.1
SPD	Volker Neumann	61,900	40.5	▼2.6	57,200	37.4	▼3.6
Greens	Silke Meier	6,884	4.5	▲0.1	10,143	6.6	▲0.5
FDP	Petra Fischer	6,635	4.3	▼1.7	15,371	10.0	▲2.2
Left	Joachim Bigus	4,274	2.8	▲1.9	5,039	3.3	▲2.6
NPD	Horst Steinke	1,532	1.0		1,482	1.0	▲0.8
Tierschutzpartei					691	0.5	▲0.1
PBC					466	0.3	▲0.1
GRAUEN					319	0.2	▲0.1
Pro German Center – Pro D-Mark Initiative					99	0.1	
BüSo					53	0.0	0.0
MLPD					21	0.0	
Informal votes		1,896			1,673		
Total valid votes		152,761			152,984		
Turnout		154,657	79.5	▼2.2			
CDU hold	Majority	9,636	6.3				
