= Eduard Puricelli =

Eduard Puricelli (16 November 1826 – 4 December 1893) was a German industrialist and politician for Free Conservative Party.

== Career ==
Puricelli founded and led several gas companies in Trier and in the Rheinböller hut. Puricelli ran several times as a representative of Catholic and conservative parties to Members mandates and belonged to the constituent Reichstag of the North German Confederation. After the Franco-German War of war 1870–71 resulted in the annexation of Alsace-Lorraine to Germany, Puricelli remained, together with eleven other companies, in Trier, for economic reasons.

Puricelli and his brother were very active in various industrial companies: forest products, blast furnaces, metals marketing, development of gas industries for city lights, and metal industries.

== Personal life ==
Puricelli's father was Heinrich Puricelli and his mother was Eugenie Traschler. His father was also known as one of the Brothers Puricelli. Eduard Puricelli married Hyazinthe Recking (1832–1899) in February 1854 at Sankt Kastor Katholisch. One of their children, Maria Purcelli (1853–1936), married Clemens Freiherr von Schorlemer-Lieser (1856–1922).

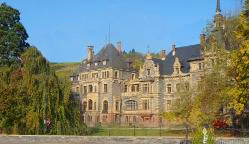
Castle Lieser

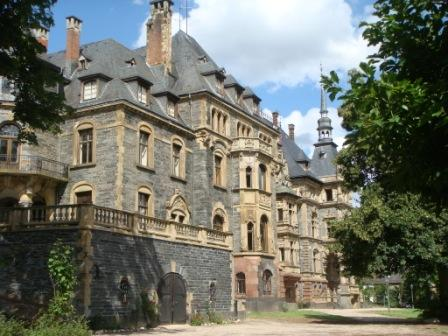
Castle Lieser

Eduard Puricelli built a castle-like villa, Schloss Lieser, in Lieser, Germany, where he cultivated large fields of wine grapes.

== External Info ==
- www.schloss-lieser.eu
- www.lieser-mosel.de
- www.helenenberg.de
