= Ingrid Pahlmann =

German politician

- Pahlmann in 2014

Member of the Bundestag; from Lower Saxony
- In office 2 January 2024 – 25 March 2025
- Preceded by: André Berghegger
- Succeeded by: Lutz Brinkmann
- Constituency: Osnabrück-Land
- In office 1 August 2019 – 26 October 2021
- Preceded by: Ursula von der Leyen
- Succeeded by: Multi-member district
- Constituency: State list
- In office 22 October 2013 – 24 October 2017
- Constituency: State list

Personal details
- Born: 1 December 1957 (age 68) Gifhorn, West Germany
- Party: Christian Democratic Union
- Children: 3

Ingrid Pahlmann (born 1 December 1957) is a German politician of the Christian Democratic Union (CDU) who has served as a member of the Bundestag from the state of Lower Saxony from 2013 to 2017, from 2019 to 2021 and again from 2024 to 2025.

== Early life and education ==
Pahlmann completed her secondary education with a vocational diploma and then pursued training as a rural housekeeper. Following this, she attended the Rural Household Management School in Celle and Hildesheim for two years, successfully graduating as a state-certified rural household management supervisor. Professionally, she worked as a trainer in rural household management, applying her expertise within her own agricultural business. In 2024, Pahlmann announced that she isn't seeking re-election for Bundestag.

== Political career ==
Pahlmann became a member of the Bundestag again in 2019, representing the Gifhorn – Peine district. She is a member of the Committee for Family, Senior Citizens, Women and Youth.

== Political positions ==
In June 2017, Pahlmann voted against her parliamentary group’s majority and in favor of Germany's introduction of same-sex marriage.
