= Cologne Cathedral Seal =

Part of Cologne Cathedral

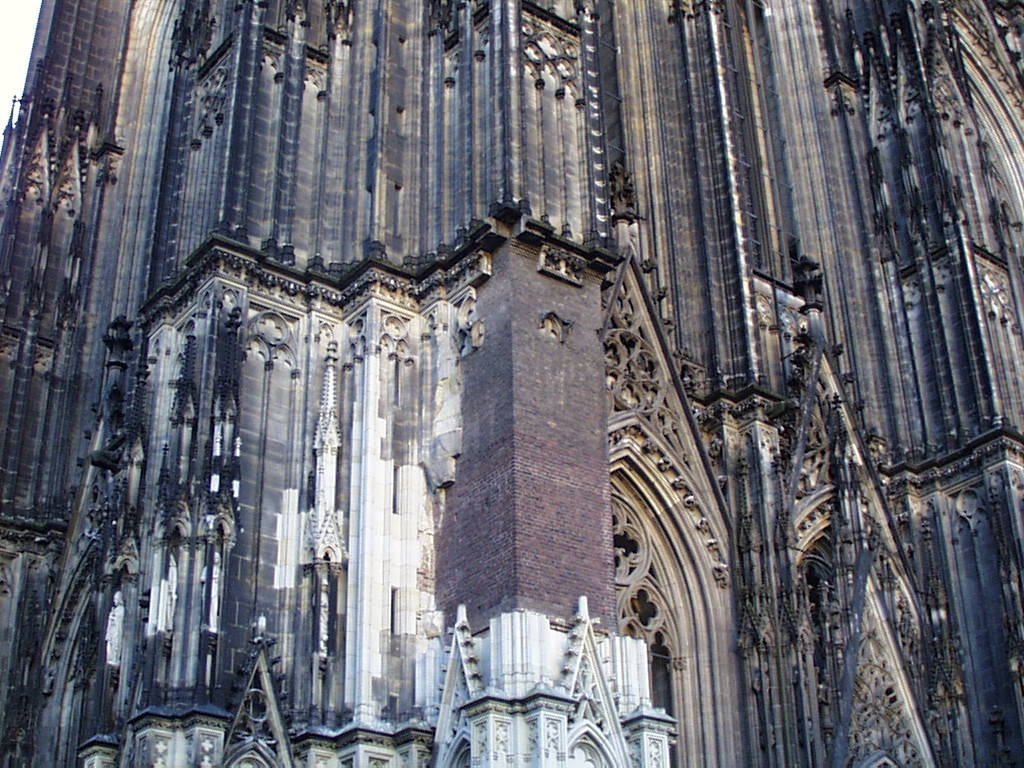
The Seal seen in 2000, before restoration work began

The Cologne Cathedral Seal (German: Kölner Domplombe) was a section of unclad brickwork which covered destroyed masonry on an exterior pillar of Cologne Cathedral. In November 1943, during an air raid by the allies, a bomb seriously damaged a pillar on the northern tower of the cathedral, sparking fears for the structural integrity of the surrounding parts of the building. The missing sandstone was replaced with bricks by the spring of 1944, which remained visible on the north tower for over 60 years. As the last major war damage, the seal was repaired between 1995 and 2005 and faced with cut stone. Some experts had argued that the seal should be left undisguised as an anti-war memorial.

== Initial damage and creation ==
As part of Operation Millennium, Cologne was regularly bombed by the Royal Air Force (RAF) from 12 May 1940 until the city's capture in 1945. Over the course of 262 raids, the Cologne Cathedral was hit directly by approximately 70 incendiary and 14 explosive bombs. Over the course of the war, nine of the twenty two vaults which comprised the cathedral's roof were destroyed, with a further six damaged severely. In addition, almost every window in the building was damaged or destroyed completely.

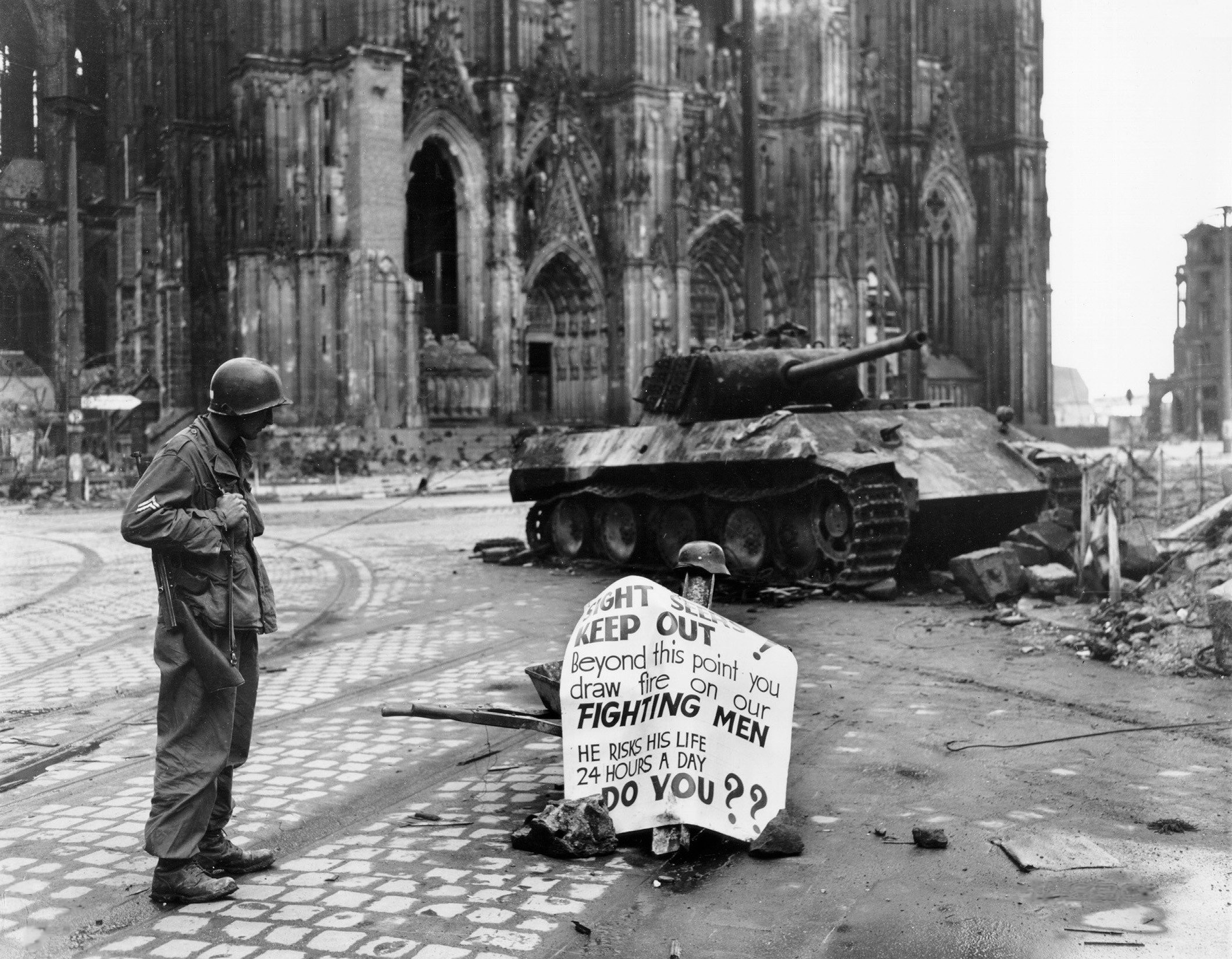
April 1945: An American soldier stands in front of Cologne Cathedral, with Seal visible in the background

On 3 November 1943, a flight of ten RAF bombers flew a sortie over the city, targeting the strategically important Cologne Central Station, located directly adjacent and to the north of the cathedral. As with almost all strategic bombing at the time, a number of bombs missed their targets and struck surrounding buildings, with a one striking the corner of the north tower approximately ten metres off the ground and blasting a hole ten metres in height. The explosive shock additionally loosened a large amount of masonry around the impact site, which added to the structural instability that the bomb's damage had created. Initial estimates by authorities called for tons of iron, cement, and bricks to reinforce the tower and impact site, which remained precarious and on the verge of possible total collapse, however, due to wartime supply shortages, the cathedral workshop was not able to carry out these repairs.

Pioneers from Pioneer Replacement Battalion 253, raised in Westhoven, Cologne, cleared away rubble in the following days under the command of Hauptmann Paul Börger, a former headmaster at a local school, who had enlisted into the German Army. Master Builder of the Cathedral Hans Güldenpfennig commissioned structural engineer Wilhelm Schorn and his construction company Wildermann and Schorn to perform repairs on the damaged section, which were carried out from November the 5th into 1944, creating what was known as the Cologne Cathedral Seal. There is some evidence that Dutch forced labourers may have taken part in the repair work. In 2004, when renovations were underway to replace the seal, the brick-and-mortar-work was found to be of an exemplary standard, with the seal having held up well in the intervening years.

== The Seal as a Memorial ==
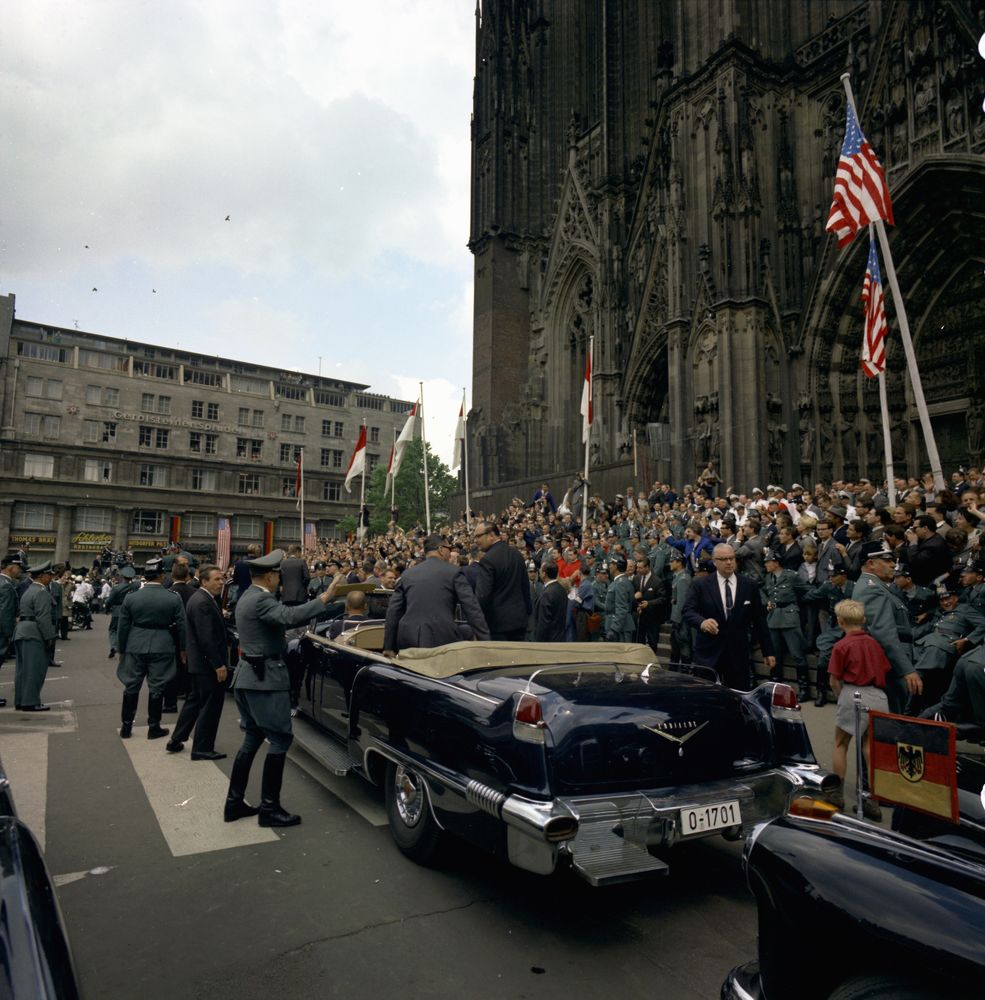
The Seal seen in the background as President John F. Kennedy visits Cologne Cathedral

Following the end of the war, none of the successive Master Builders had intended to leave the seal exposed for the duration of their tenure. Nevertheless, it was not until the mid-1990s that serious efforts to cover the seal with cut stone cladding were made. Due to the placing of the entire Cologne Cathedral under monument protection in 1985, the cathedral chapter had to submit a formal application to the local authorities to work on the seal, despite it not being part of the initial construction. With the seal becoming an intrinsic part of the overall construction of the cathedral for many locals, discussions were prompted as to whether the seal should be retained as a memorial to the Second World War. Nevertheless, under pressure from the cathedral, local authorities made the decision to go ahead with the repairs, which were purely aesthetic and were not required structurally. In later interviews, Master Builder Peter Füssenich stated that "it would not have harmed the cathedral if the seal had remained in its original form. It was a trace of history".

== Covering ==
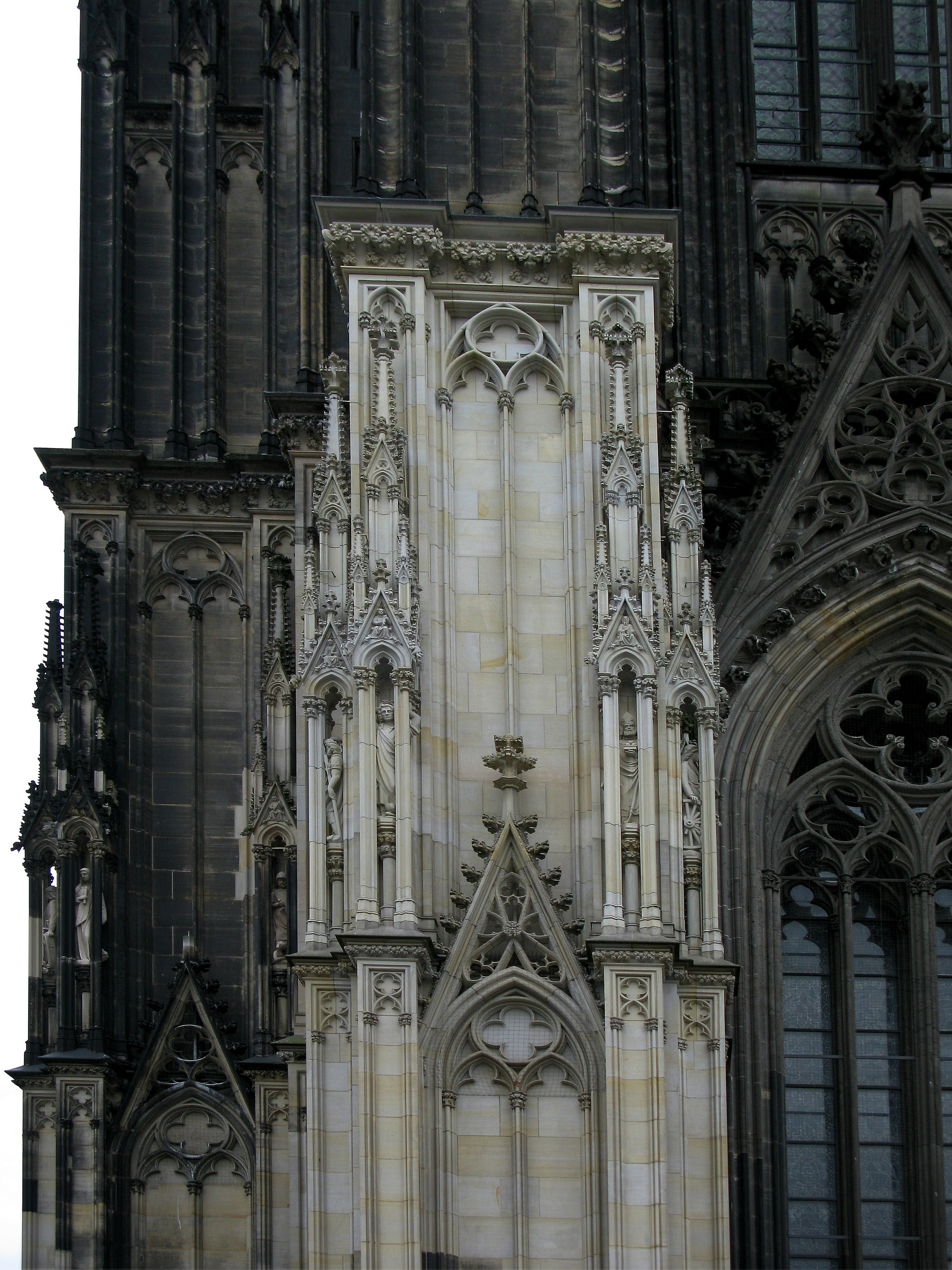
The visibly newer replacement stonework seen after installation

The works to cover the seal took nearly ten years, from 1995–2005, with Fussenich stating that "covering the seal took as much effort as building an entire village church". Sandstone from Oberkirchen was chosen for the repairs, as it was the same type as was used for the initial construction of the tower. Stonemasons at the Cathedral Workshop chiselled 250 tonnes of stone into 823 blocks, with 124 of these being elaborate sculptural finials, pinnacles, and capitals. Stonemasons Willi Bauer and Steinmetz Marcus Schroer created these structures, as well as floral decorative pieces, based on modern designs, rather than from historical plans. The plants depicted include clover, thistle, hops, bougainvillea, and black-eyed susan, and are the most recent pieces of stonework completed at the cathedral. In addition to these, the figures of Saints Cordula, Christopher, Catharine of Alexandria, and Nicholas were all recreated from 18th century plaster models by Peter Fuchs.

The stones began to be moved into place in March 2004, and work was complete by August 2005.

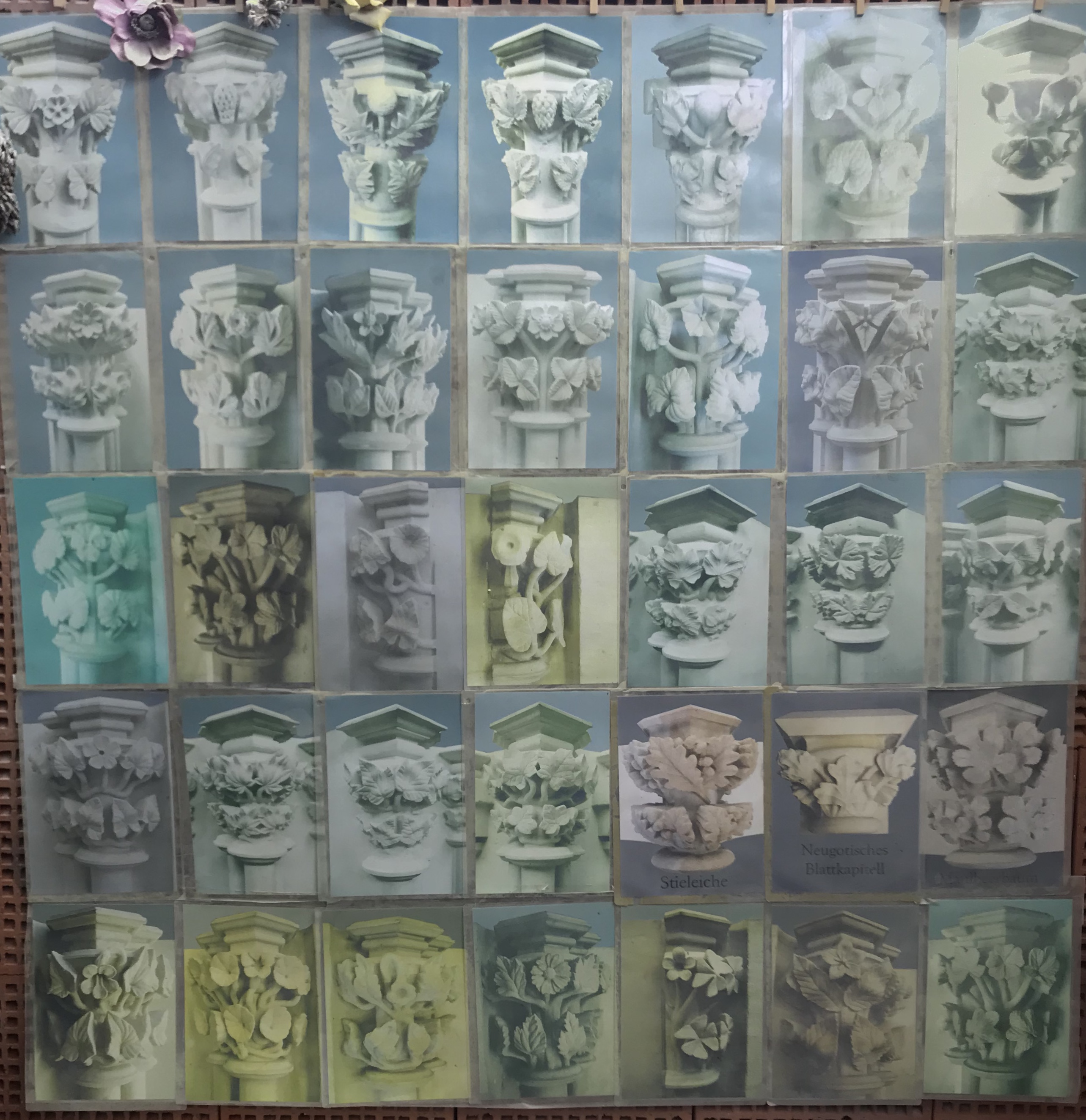
Some of the stone pieces which were installed to cover the seal
