= Munich Business School =

Private business school in Munich

- Type: Business school, Private university
- Established: 1991
- Affiliations: FIBAA
- Chancellor: Dr. Christine Menges
- President: Jörg Schwitalla
- Dean: Stefan Baldi
- Academic staff: ~179
- Administrative staff: ~50
- Students: 1,002 (Winter semester 2024)
- Location: Munich, Bavaria, Germany; 48°08′10″N 11°31′28″E
- Campus: Urban
- Website: www.munich-business-school.de

Munich Business School (MBS) is a private international business school located in Munich (Bavaria, Germany). It became the first state-accredited private university in Bavaria in 1999. Munich Business School ranks among the top private Business Schools in Germany and in the top 25 performers group regarding internationality and student mobility.

== History ==
Munich Business School was established in 1991 as part of the European Business Schools International (ebsi) under the name "EBA München" (Europäische Betriebswirtschafts-Akademie München). It became the first state-accredited private university in Bavaria in 1999. It was renamed to "Munich Business School" in 2003.

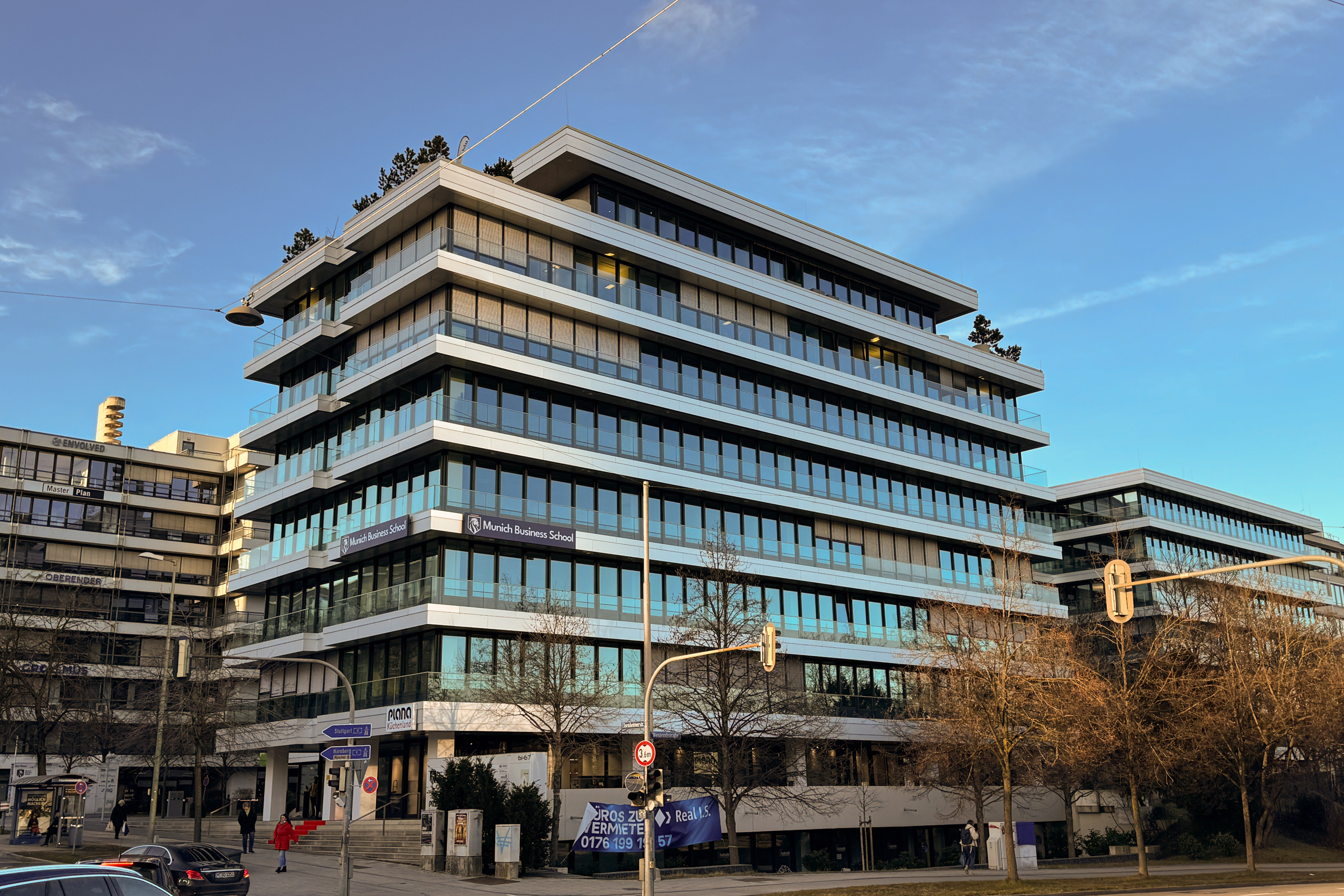
The Munich Business School building in the Elsenheimerstrasse, photographed in January 2025

Rudolf Gröger was President of the university from 2009 to 2015. In August 2017, Alfred Gossner took over the office until December 2024. Jörg Schwitalla has been the President of Munich Business School since March 2025.

== Accreditation and rankings ==
All MBS Programs are accredited by the Bavarian Ministry for Education, Cultural Affairs, Science and the Arts (Bayerisches Staatsministerium für Bildung und Kultus, Wissenschaft und Kunst) and the FIBAA (first accredited in 2007 and re-accredited in 2013). As first private university in Bavaria, Munich Business School received institutional accreditation by the German Council of Science and Humanities in 2010, granting it an unlimited state accreditation, and confirmed it in 2015.

	2018	2016	2011	2010	2009
Wirtschaftswoche (national university of applied sciences ranking)	6th	7th	6th	8th	9th

== Student Enrollment and International Diversity ==
Munich Business School has experienced steady growth in student enrollment in recent years. Since 2020, the number of enrolled students has increased from 832 to 1,002 in 2024. The diversity of nationalities represented within the student body has also expanded, rising from 75 in 2020 to 82 in 2024. In 2024, the largest student groups come from Germany, India, China, Taiwan, the United States, Italy, and Spain.

Year	Enrolled Students	Nationalities
2020	832	75
2021	850	81
2022	883	80
2023	891	88
2024	1,002	82

== Study programs ==
Munich Business School confers degrees exclusively in business administration. The university provides Bachelor's, Masters, MBA programs and a terminal DBA degree in cooperation with Sheffield Hallam University as well as double degree programs in cooperation with numerous other business schools from around the world. Courses available in German and English.

== Partner universities ==
Munich Business School partners with over 60 universities worldwide:

- Argentina: UADE Business School (Buenos Aires)
- Australia: Bond University (Gold Coast), University of Melbourne (Melbourne)
- Austria: MCI Management Center Innsbruck (Innsbruck)
- Canada: Brock University (St. Catharines), Université Laval (Québec), University of Victoria (Victoria)
- China: Fudan University (Shanghai), Tongji University (Shanghai), University of Hong Kong (Hong Kong)
- Croatia: Zagreb School of Economics and Management
- France: Skema Business School (Sophia Antipolis/Lille/Paris), INSEEC Business School (Paris/Bordeaux)
- Great Britain: Oxford Brookes University (Oxford), Regent's University London
- Hungary: Corvinus University (Budapest)
- Italy: Università Bocconi (Milan)
- Mexico: ITESM/ EGADE Business School (Monterrey)
- New Zealand: University of Auckland (Auckland)
- Peru: ESAN University (Lima)
- Poland: Kraków University of Economics (Kraków)
- Singapore: Singapore Management University (Singapore)
- South Africa: University of Cape Town (Cape Town)
- South Korea: Seoul National University (Seoul)
- Spain: Universitat Pompeu Fabra (Barcelona)
- USA: Boston University (Boston), Florida International University (Miami)

== Notable lecturers and alumni ==
- Jack Nasher - author and negotiation advisor
- Philipp Brinkmann - entrepreneur and CEO of Tripsta S.A.
