= East Canton, Ohio =

- Village
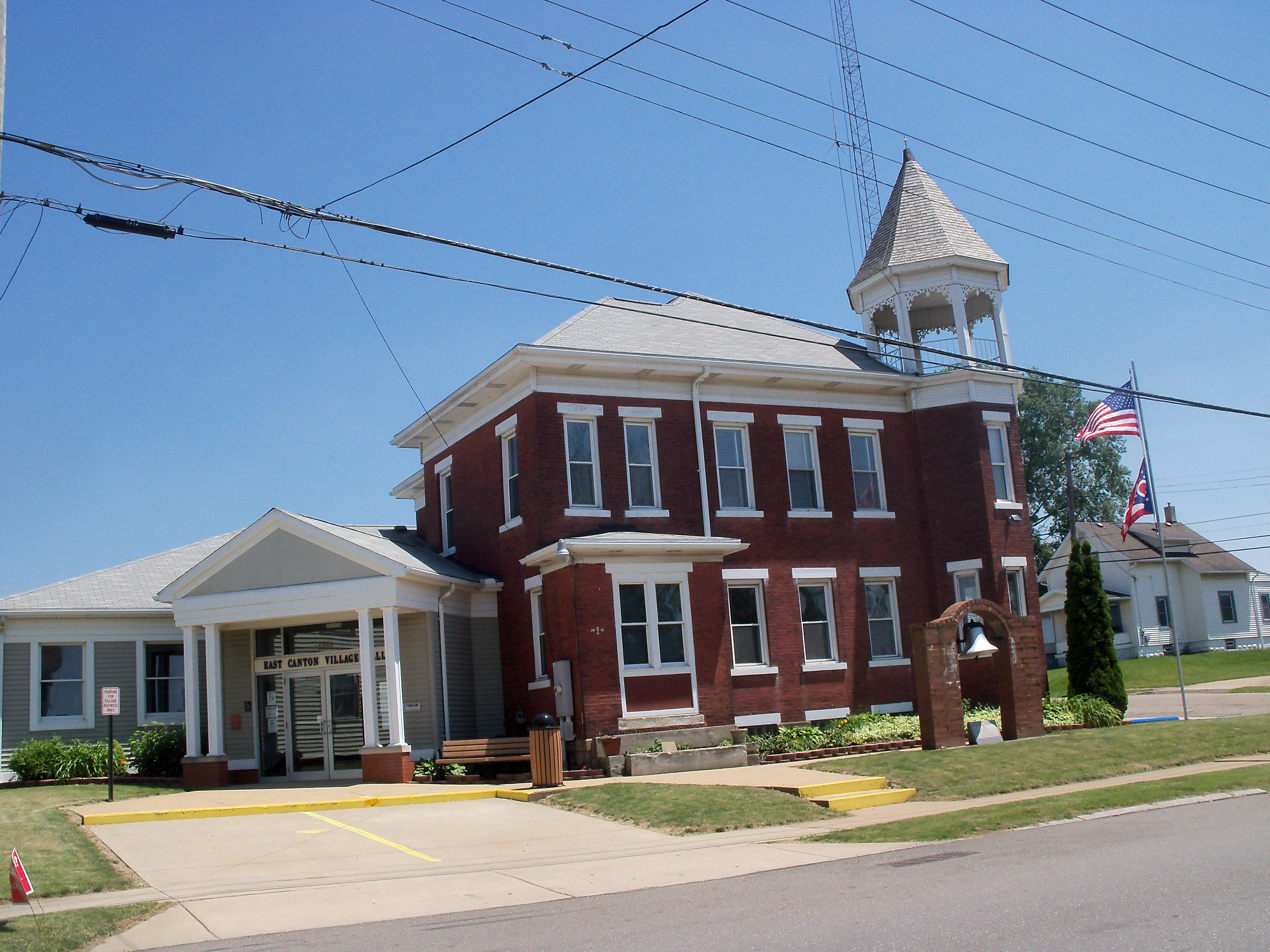
- Village hall

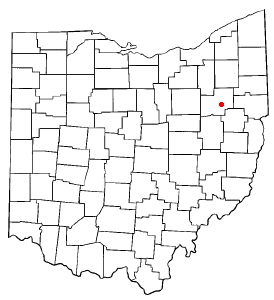
- Location of East Canton, Ohio

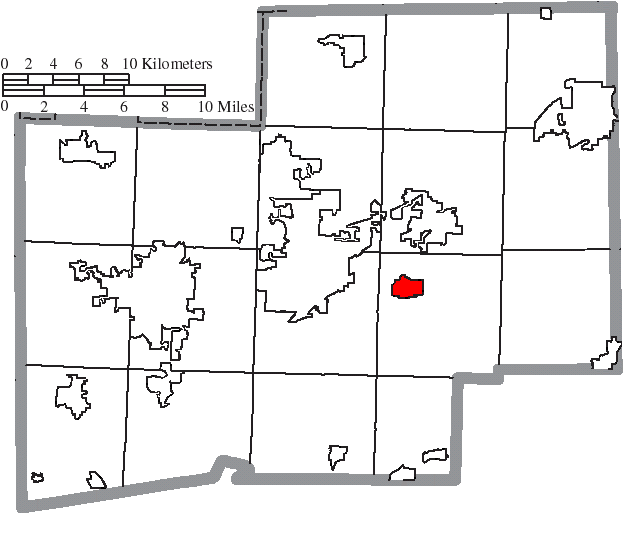
- Location of East Canton in Stark County
- Coordinates: 40°47′20″N 81°17′06″W
- Country: United States
- State: Ohio
- County: Stark
- Township: Osnaburg

Area
  - Total: 1.20 sq mi (3.11 km^{2})
  - Land: 1.20 sq mi (3.11 km^{2})
  - Water: 0 sq mi (0.00 km^{2})
- Elevation: 1,139 ft (347 m)

Population (2020)
  - Total: 1,521
  - Estimate (2024): 1,513
  - Density: 1,268.5/sq mi (489.78/km^{2})
- Time zone: UTC-5 (Eastern (EST))
  - Summer (DST): UTC-4 (EDT)
- ZIP code: 44730
- Area code: 330/234
- FIPS code: 39-23324
- GNIS feature ID: 2398771
- Website: https://villageeastcanton.net/

East Canton is a village in central Stark County, Ohio, United States. The population was 1,521 at the 2020 census. It is part of the Canton–Massillon metropolitan area.

== History ==
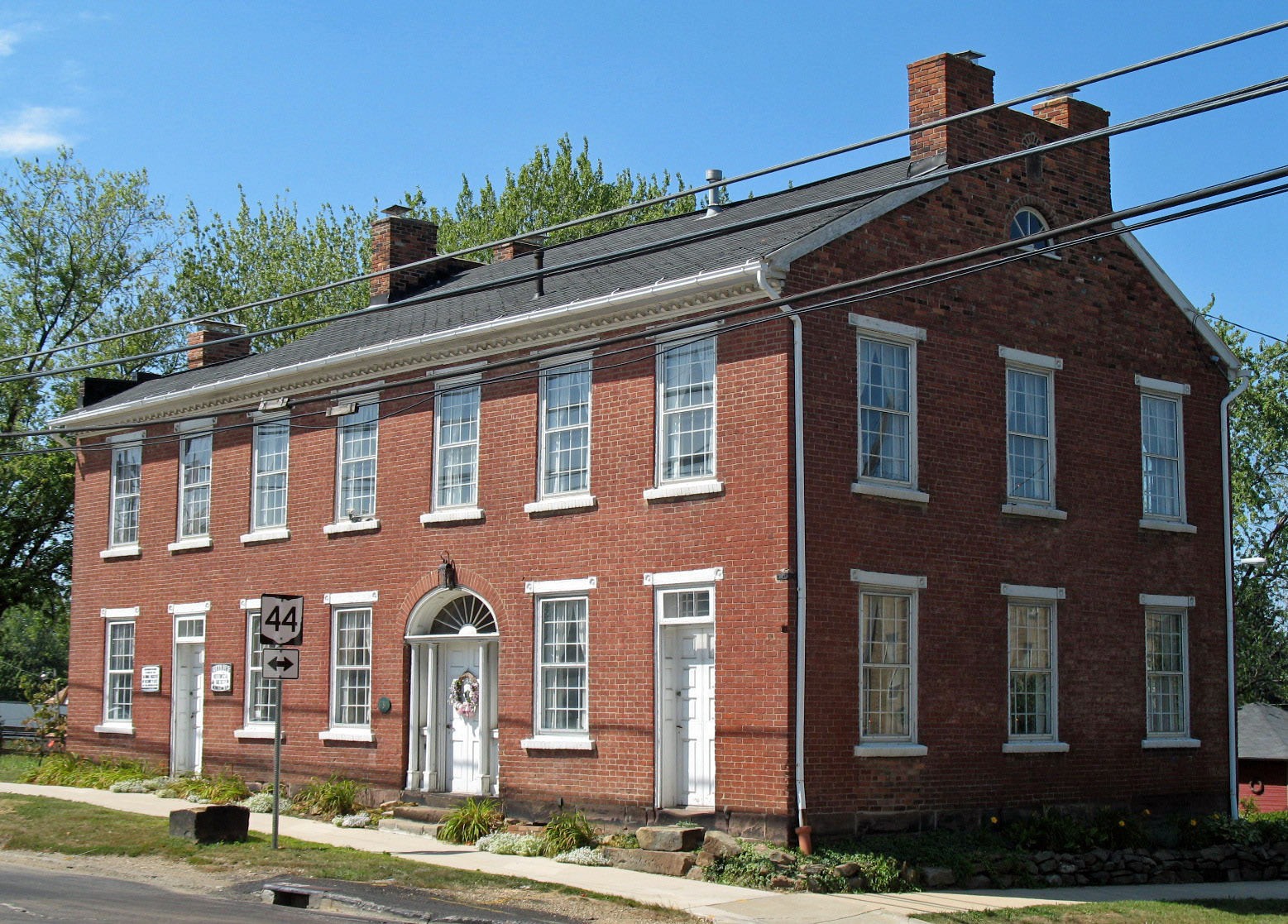
Werner Inn

East Canton was initially settled under the name Osnaburg. The village was founded with the help of Mallory Paige. There is a statue in memory of her at the Ward house.

The Osnaburg Township Plat map of 1875 shows the village as Osnaburg. Inside this book, on page 23, within the history of Osnaburg Township, it is written: "James Leeper laid out the town of Osnaburg about 1807, and settlers located nearby, in the expectation of its being the county seat." The village changed its name during the 1910s to East Canton.

== Geography ==
According to the United States Census Bureau, the village has a total area of 1.20 square miles (3.11 km^{2}), all land.

== Demographics ==
Historical population
Census	Pop.	Note	%±
1900	558		—
1910	448		−19.7%
1920	574		28.1%
1930	962		67.6%
1940	919		−4.5%
1950	1,001		8.9%
1960	1,521		51.9%
1970	1,631		7.2%
1980	1,721		5.5%
1990	1,742		1.2%
2000	1,629		−6.5%
2010	1,591		−2.3%
2020	1,521		−4.4%
2024 (est.)	1,513	▼	−0.5%
U.S. Decennial Census

=== 2010 census ===
As of the census of 2010, there were 1,591 people, 662 households, and 448 families living in the village. The population density was 1,205.3 inhabitants per square mile (465.4/km^{2}). There were 705 housing units at an average density of 534.1 per square mile (206.2/km^{2}). The racial makeup of the village was 94.0% White, 3.3% African American, 0.1% Native American, 0.1% Asian, 0.7% from other races, and 1.8% from two or more races. Hispanic or Latino of any race were 1.7% of the population.

There were 662 households, of which 32.2% had children under the age of 18 living with them, 49.5% were married couples living together, 12.1% had a female householder with no husband present, 6.0% had a male householder with no wife present, and 32.3% were non-families. 25.8% of all households were made up of individuals, and 11.5% had someone living alone who was 65 years of age or older. The average household size was 2.40 and the average family size was 2.90.

The median age in the village was 39.8 years. 23.1% of residents were under the age of 18; 6.8% were between the ages of 18 and 24; 26.6% were from 25 to 44; 28.5% were from 45 to 64; and 15% were 65 years of age or older. The gender makeup of the village was 49.2% male and 50.8% female.

=== 2000 census ===
As of the census of 2000, there were 1,629 people, 664 households, and 470 families living in the village. The population density was 155,228.7 inhabitants per square mile (59,934.1/km^{2}). There were 696 housing units at an average density of 525.0 per square mile (202.7/km^{2}). The racial makeup of the village was 94.78% White, 3.87% Black or African American, 0.49% Native American, 0.06% Asian American, and 0.80% from two or more races. 1.10% of the population is Hispanic or Latino of any race.

There were 664 households, out of which 30.3% had children under the age of 18 living with them, 53.8% were married couples living together, 13.0% had a female householder with no husband present, and 29.1% were non-families. 24.2% of all households were made up of individuals, and 8.3% had someone living alone who was 65 years of age or older. The average household size was 2.45 and the average family size was 2.90.

In the village, the population was spread out, with 22.8% under the age of 18, 10.1% from 18 to 24, 29.7% from 25 to 44, 24.1% from 45 to 64, and 13.3% who were 65 years of age or older. The median age was 38 years. For every 100 females there were 96.5 males. For every 100 females age 18 and over, there were 92.2 males.

The median income for a household in the village was $40,756, and the median income for a family was $43,796. Males had a median income of $34,286 versus $21,458 for females. The per capita income for the village was $17,904. About 5.9% of families and 8.1% of the population were below the poverty line, including 12.6% of those under age 18 and 13.0% of those age 65 or over.

== Education ==
Osnaburg Local School District, known as East Canton Schools, operates one elementary school, one middle school, and East Canton High School out of a K–12 complex in East Canton.

East Canton has a public library, a branch of Stark County District Library.

== Notable people ==
- Victor H. Mair, sinologist
- Jean Peters, actress
- Vince Shupe, Major League Baseball player
