= Anke Hennig =

German politician

Anke Hennig (born 7 October 1964) is a German politician for the SPD and has been a member of the Bundestag, the federal diet since 2021.

== Life ==
Hennig was born in 1964 in the West German city of Osnabrück and was elected to the Bundestag in 2021. After graduating from the Völker public school in Osnabrück, Hennig first worked as a taxi driver in Bramsche. In 1989 she worked as an office assistant in Hamburg. Two years later she moved back to Bramsche and worked as an office assistant in a building materials store and a car rental company. Between 2002 and 2006 she worked again as a taxi driver. Then in 2007 she went to Australia with her two children and worked there in a German discount store until 2008. After returning to Bramsche again, she worked in child day care and qualified as a child day care worker. Until 2021, she worked at a primary school in Bramsche, where she was responsible for homework supervision and afternoon activities.

Anke Hennig is the daughter of the former SPD member of the Lower Saxony state parliament Helga Lewandowsky. She is married and has three children, two daughters and a foster son.

== Politics ==
Anke Hennig joined the SPD in 1986. In 2011 she was elected to the local council of Achmer, a district of Bramsche. Since 2015 she has also been a member of the Bramsche town council. There she is chair of the Social Affairs and Sports Committee and a member of the School and Culture Committee. In 2018 she became local mayor in Achmer.

In the 2021 federal election, she ran for her party as a direct candidate in the Osnabrück-Land constituency and in 18th place on the Lower Saxony state list. In the constituency she lost to the CDU candidate André Berghegger, but entered the German Bundestag via the state list. In the 20th German Bundestag, she is a member of the Committee for Family Affairs, Senior Citizens, Women and Youth and a deputy member of the Committee for Food and Agriculture and the Committee for Human Rights and Humanitarian Aid. She is also deputy chair of the German-Pacific Parliamentary Group and a deputy member of the Council of Elders Commission for Matters concerning Members of Parliament's Staff.

In the SPD parliamentary group, Hennig has been deputy spokesperson of the working group on family, seniors, women and youth since 25 January 2022 and deputy spokesperson of the working group on queer policy since 14 February 2022.

== Memberships ==
- Board of Trustees of the Magnus Hirschfeld Foundation
- Workers' Welfare Association
- Landesfrauenrat Niedersachsen e.V. (State Women's Council of Lower Saxony)
- Social Association of Germany (SoVD)
- Other local associations
