= Osnaburg Local School District =

School district in Ohio, United States

Address
- 310 Browning Court North East Canton, Ohio, 44730; United States

District information
- Type: Public
- Grades: PK–12
- Schools: 3
- NCES District ID: 3904991

Students and staff
- Students: 898 (2024–2025)
- Teachers: 53.10 (on an FTE basis) (2024–2025)
- Staff: 114.62 (on an FTE basis) (2024–2025)
- Student–teacher ratio: 16.91 (2024–2025)

Other information
- Website: www.osnaburglocal.org

Osnaburg Local School District (East Canton local schools) is a school district located in Stark County, Ohio, United States. It has around 880 students in Pre-K-12. There mascot is the hornets, and their colors are blue and gold

The distract has one building housing all Pre-K-12 students though they are split up between elementary, middle and high school.

East Canton High School is the districts only high school.

As of 2025, Darla Schwab is the president of the board of education.
