= Sögeln =

Village in Germany

Coordinates: 52°27′N 8°00′E

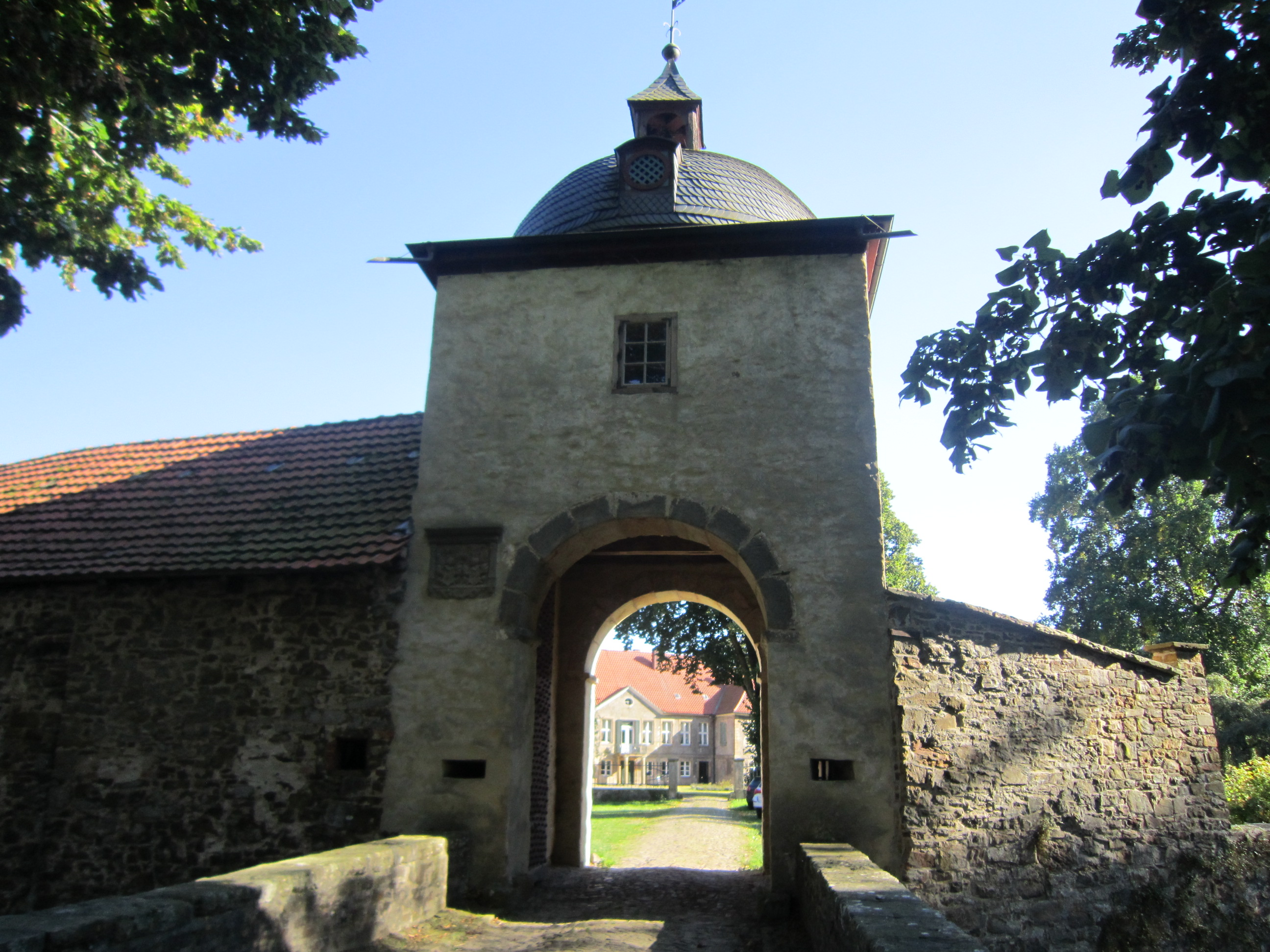
Gateway to Sögeln manor in Bramsche

Sögeln is a village in Lower Saxony, Germany. Since 1972, it has been a part of the city of Bramsche. The village developed around a castle from the 14th century.

== History ==
Sögeln is a farming community located west of the manor of the same name in the north of Bramsche.

A linden avenue, closed to public traffic, leads to the manor, which is surrounded by two moats fed by the Sögelner Hase river. The main building, dating from the end of the 18th century, is a functionally simple, two-story structure with three wings. It was built on the site of a castle first documented in the 14th century. However, two brothers, Thethard and Heinrich von Sögeln, were already mentioned in documents in 1236. The oldest part of the still standing complex is the gate tower with loopholes on the ground floor; the baroque tower cap with the clock dates from the 18th century. The Sögeln manor frequently changed hands. It was owned by the families von Braken (1323), von Ledebur (from 1350), von Knehem (from 1426), von Langen (1590–1750), von der Horst (1750–1792), von Hammerstein (1793–1817), Rathgen (1817–1846), von Stoltzenberg (1846–1871), and von Rappard (1871–1995). It is currently owned by the von Bock and Polach families.

In 1793, Friedrich Philipp von Hammerstein zu Equord acquired the estate and commissioned the construction of the new main house. After he died in 1802, heavily indebted and without direct heirs, the estate was acquired by the general tax collector Rathgen in 1817. Through his stepdaughter, the property passed to the von Rappard family, whose descendants, the von Bock and Polach families, are the current owners. Around 1870, the young Prussian lieutenant Paul von Hindenburg frequently visited the estate. The future Reich President was engaged to Irmengard von Rappard, who died in 1871 at the age of only 17.
