= George Brinkman murders =

2017 murders

- George Brinkman, Who murdered five people.
- Location: North Royalton, Ohio; Lake Township, Ohio
- Date: June 10–11, 2017
- Attack type: Spree Killing
- Weapons: Knife; Pillow.45 pistol
- Deaths: 5
- Perpetrator: George Brinkman Jr.

George Brinkman Jr. (born January 28, 1972) is an American spree killer who murdered five people during a 2017 killing spree. His first victims were Suzanne Taylor, with whom he had been friends since elementary school, and her two daughters, 21-year-old Taylor Pifer and 18-year-old Kylie Pifer. On June 10, 2017, Brinkman took the women captive inside their home in North Royalton, Ohio. He killed Suzanne in front of her daughters before killing them as well. Brinkman then went to the Lake Township, Ohio home of 71-year-old Rogell “Gene” John and his 64-year-old wife Roberta “Bobbi” John. Brinkman, who had known the couple for over ten years, shot them both to death.

Brinkman pleaded guilty to the North Royalton murders in November 2018 and to the Lake Township murders in October 2019. He was sentenced to death for murdering Suzanne and her daughters in December 2018. In October 2019 he received another death sentence for murdering the Johns. In July 2021, the Ohio Supreme Court vacated Brinkman's convictions and death sentences in the North Royalton cases. In 2023, Brinkman again pleaded guilty to the North Royalton murders and was sentenced to death. As of 2026, Brinkman remains on death row at the Ross Correctional Institution in Chillicothe, Ohio.

== Background ==
=== Victims ===
Suzanne Taylor was from Parma Heights, Ohio. She graduated from Valley Forge High School in 1990 and went on to attend Hiram College where she earned a Bachelor of Arts degree in psychology, sociology, and political science. She worked as an administrator at REO Property Consultants, starting in 2012, and as a real estate appraiser for Forsythe Appraisals, starting in 2013. Suzanne lived in the Cleveland suburb of North Royalton, Ohio, with her two daughters, Kylie Pifer, 18, and Taylor Pifer, 21. Taylor Pifer was a 2014 graduate of North Royalton High School and had just completed her junior year at Kent State University. She played softball while in high school and worked at the Kent State Fashion Management Store while in college. She was working towards obtaining a bachelor's degree in fashion design and merchandising. Kylie Pifer was set to begin her sophomore year at Bowling Green State University in the fall of 2017. She was involved in theater and studied biology, and aspired to become a forensic scientist. She would have turned 19 on Sunday, June 18, 2017.

Rogell E. “Gene” John II (born 1945) was a graduate of East Canton High School and Bowling Green State University. He was also a Vietnam War veteran. Mr. John worked in the circulation department of The Canton Repository and was the circulation director at The Massillon Independent and GateHouse Ohio. He then started his own business distributing telephone books and publications. He was married to Roberta R. “Bobbi” John (born 1952), a North Canton Hoover High School, Ohio University and Akron University graduate. Before retirement, Mrs. John worked as the director of special services for Stow-Munroe Falls City School District. She also worked for the Alliance and Louisville school districts. Both Mr. and Mrs. John were active members of Mt. Tabor United Methodist Church and the Osnaburg Historical Society. The couple lived in Lake Township, Ohio.

=== Perpetrator ===
George Brinkman (born 1972) knew all of his victims well. He went to elementary school with Suzanne Taylor and remained friends with her through adulthood. Neighbors of Taylor and the Pifer sisters say that Brinkman often visited their home. Taylor let Brinkman do various jobs around her house and also allowed him to sleep in her house during times when he was homeless. Taylor's family believes that Brinkman wanted to be “more than friends” with her. According to witnesses, the Pifer women looked up to Brinkman like a “second father.”

Brinkman knew the John couple for more than ten years. He formerly dated Gene John's daughter and lived with her for several years. Brinkman had previously worked as a phone book delivery person for Gene John's business. He had also worked making furniture out of his garage and as a mechanic. Right before the murders, Brinkman was watching the John couple's home and caring for their seventeen-year-old dog while the couple was away on a beach vacation in North Carolina with one of Bobbi John's sons and his children.

Brinkman was found guilty of disorderly conduct in 1990, criminal mischief in 1991, and passing bad checks in 1998. He spent time in prison for his crimes.

== Murders ==
=== North Royalton murders ===
| sentence = Death

On June 10, 2017, Brinkman held Suzanne and her daughters captive inside their home. Investigators concluded that Brinkman bound the women at their wrists and ankles and killed them one by one. Investigators also believe that he cut off Taylor's flowing long hair which she took pride in. Brinkman first killed Suzanne within arm's reach of her daughters by stabbing her in the head and slitting her throat. After murdering their mother in front of them, Brinkman murdered both Pifer sisters. He killed Taylor Pifer by smothering her with a pillow. He then killed Kylie Pifer by strangling her with a phone cord. Brinkman placed the victims' bodies in Taylor's bed and covered them with blankets. He fled to the Johns' home in Stark County, Ohio.

=== Lake Township murders ===
| sentence = Death When at the Johns’ home, Brinkman got out Gene John's .45 caliber handgun and loaded it. According to his interrogation, Mrs. John accused him of not giving their deaf-blind dog its medication, leading to an argument. After Mr. John questioned him about the gun Brinkman says he ordered the couple to an upstairs bedroom. Prosecutors would later argue that Brinkman chose that specific bedroom because it was farthest away from the neighbors. The Johns locked the door, so Brinkman shot at the doorknob to enter the room. He shot Mr. John three times and struck Mrs. John in the head with the gun, fracturing her skull. He also shot Mrs. John twice. Brinkman then stole $40 from Mr. John's wallet and $100 from Mrs. John's purse so that he could flee the state.

== Investigation and arrest ==
On June 12, 2017, Taylor Pifer's boyfriend became worried when he couldn't reach her on her phone. He went to her house, where he noticed that Suzanne Taylor's bedroom door, which was always open, was shut. Upon opening the bedroom door, he found the three deceased women in the bed under a blanket. The police were called and responded, finding the three women "face down in bed all lying right next to one another." After finding the women's bodies, Pifer's boyfriend called Brinkman to inform him. He reported that Brinkman seemed surprised and genuinely sad upon hearing about the deaths. Family and friends of Taylor and the Pifers and police later found Taylor's hair around the house. This led investigators to believe Brinkman cut off Taylor's hair before killing her.

The Johns' bodies were discovered on June 12 by Mr. John's son, who had gone to check on them when his father didn't show up to work. Like Taylor and her daughters, the Johns were covered with blankets.

After committing the murders, Brinkman went to the home of a woman he knew in Brunswick, Ohio. He started a police standoff, during which he spoke on Facebook to a TV reporter about the murders. The standoff lasted nine hours, beginning at 9:30 pm on June 12 and ending at 5:30 am the next day. A SWAT team surrounded the house, and officers entered, finding Brinkman armed with a gun. They subdued him with a stun gun and arrested him. When taken into custody, Brinkman was in possession of evidence linking him to the murders of the Johns. He confessed to killing the Johns and to throwing evidence out of a vehicle window while on Interstate 77 in Summit County. Brinkman was held in jail on a 75 million dollar bond.

== Criminal proceedings ==
=== Criminal proceedings regarding the North Royalton murders ===
On November 5, 2018, Brinkman pleaded guilty to the North Royalton murders. He also waived his right to a jury. Judges Peter Corrigan, Michael Shaughnessy, and Timothy McCormick officially found him guilty of murdering Taylor and the Pifers on November 26. Though Brinkman's defense attorneys offered for him to plead guilty in exchange for a sentence of life without parole, District Attorney Michael O’Malley and his office refused to drop their pursuit of the death penalty.

On November 27, the judges found that Brinkman should face the death penalty for the murder of Taylor and her daughters. Brinkman's attorneys argued that he should be sentenced to life without parole due to the mitigating factors. Brinkman was formally sentenced to death for the murders on December 28. During his victim impact statement, Taylor and Kylie Pifer's father, Brian Pifer said:

“For nearly a year and a half now, I’ve been attending all of these pre-trial hearings, reading all the motions filed by the defendant, each arguing that he has specific rights...but today I’m asking you honorable judges to be the voices for the rights taken by Mr. George Brinkman Jr. The right of Taylor to finish her last year at Kent State University. The right of Taylor to graduate, to get a job in the fashion industry that she was so passionate about, to get her first apartment, her first car, her first house. Taylor’s right to get married, have children, celebrate the holidays, her right to play another game of softball and sing in the car and go to concerts. Kylie’s right to become the forensic scientist that she always wanted to be, to finish her education at BGSU, and to get her masters that she had planned on....her right to get married and have children, and all of our rights to a part of those things.”

Mr. Pifer also said:

“The rhetoric used by the defense in the entire second half of these proceedings was meant to diminish the impact of the crimes, referring to them as ‘a situation, an event, an incident.' That is not accepting responsibility for what you have done. The reality is that George Brinkman Jr. took from all three of them the very right to breathe when he carried out his plan last June, when he brutally murdered Taylor, Kylie, and Suzanne. When he bound them, murdering them one by one, he didn’t show any mercy. Yet he has the audacity to ask this court, you, for mercy on him. They (the victims) didn't deserve this. That's why I am asking you to be the three voices for the three lost. I’m asking you to remember all the testimony that you heard and all the rights Mr. Brinkman ripped from them, from all of us."

O'Malley said of Brinkman's death sentence, “if there's an individual who deserved the death penalty, it was George Brinkman who, over two days, murdered five people,” and that "Brinkman is a mass murderer who should quickly be executed." Brinkman's execution date was set for January 15, 2020. In addition to his death sentence, Brinkman was sentenced to forty-seven years in prison.

On July 21, 2021, the Ohio Supreme Court vacated Brinkman's conviction and death sentence concerning the North Royalton murders. The court ruled that Brinkman did not have a "full understanding” that by pleading guilty, he would waive his constitutional rights to confront witnesses against him and to have the state prove his guilt beyond a reasonable doubt. The case was remanded to the Cuyahoga County Common Pleas Court for new proceedings. The ruling did not affect Brinkman's death sentences regarding the Lake Township murders. A trial date was set for January 11, 2023. On May 31, 2023, George Brinkman was sentenced to death.

=== Criminal proceedings regarding the Lake Township murders ===
In October 2019, Brinkman pleaded guilty to the aggravated murder of the John couple. Though Brinkman pleaded guilty, a trial was conducted because he faced the death penalty. After deliberating for thirty minutes, Judges Chryssa Harnett, Kristin Farmer, and Taryn Heath found Brinkman guilty of all charges regarding the couple's deaths. During the sentencing phase, defense counsel argued that Brinkman's life should be spared due to his history of homelessness and mental health problems and his childhood. Brinkman, however, argued in favor of his death sentence. He said in a statement, “they (his victims) were extremely kind, caring and wonderful and people who did not deserve to be killed by me.” He also said he was “so very sorry for all the pain and suffering I have caused the families and friends of Gene and Bobbi. I know that will never be enough but it’s all I have.” In regards to the mitigating circumstances, Brinkman said, “yes, I had a horrible childhood ... yes, I’ve had a lot of bad things happen to me in my life, so what? Other (people have) had it worse and never went around killing people they care about.”

Judges Harnett, Farmer, and Heath agreed with Brinkman and the prosecution and sentenced Brinkman to death on October 4. In her victim impact statement, Mrs. John's sister told Brinkman, “you are a monster, a vile evil being that deserves to be put to death." Mr. John's granddaughter said “my opinion of you has somewhat changed. I decided to not let the anger and hate that I felt for you consume me. I do not hate you, though I thought you were a good man and that is why grandpa and bobby had faith in you. All I want for you in exchange for my forgiveness is the facts, but that is something we will never know."

In July 2022, the Supreme Court of Ohio unanimously affirmed the three-judge panel's decision to sentence Brinkman to death for murdering the John couple.

=== Incarceration status ===
Brinkman is currently on death row at the Ross Correctional Institution in Chillicothe, Ohio. On September 27, 2022, the Supreme Court of Ohio scheduled Brinkman's execution for September 23, 2026. His execution was later stayed pending the completion of his post-conviction appeals.

== See also ==
- List of death row inmates in the United States
- List of people scheduled to be executed in the United States
