= Reinhard von Schorlemer =

German member of Bundestag

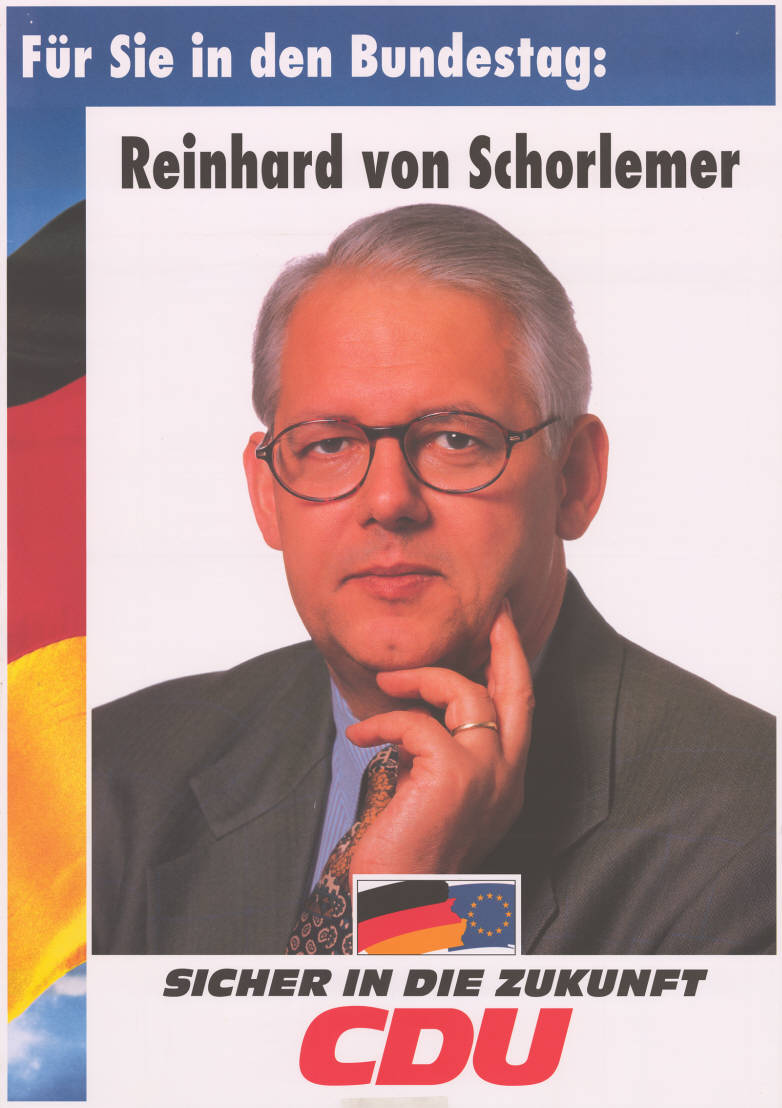
- Election for Bundestag 1994

Member of the Bundestag; for Osnabrück-Land
- In office 4 November 1980 – 17 October 2002
- Preceded by: Constituency established
- Succeeded by: Georg Schirmbeck

Member of the Landtag of Lower Saxony; for Bersenbrück
- In office 21 June 1974 – 4 November 1980
- Preceded by: Karl Möller
- Succeeded by: Hans-Jürgen Nagel

Personal details
- Born: Reinhard Freiherr von Schorlemer; 27 April 1938 (age 88) Fürstenau, Germany
- Party: Christian Democratic Union
- Children: 5

Reinhard von Schorlemer (born 27 April 1938) is a farmer, landowner and German politician for Christian Democratic Union of Germany.

== Biography ==
His parents were Timo Clemens Freiherr von Schorlemer (1903–1962) and Alice Elisabeth Gräfin von Merveldt Freiin zu Lembeck. Since 1955 Schorlemer has been a member of the Christian Democratic Union political party. A farmer on his own land in Schlichthorst, Lower Saxony since 1965, from 1974 to 1980 Schorlemer was a member of the Landtag of Lower Saxony and was a member of the German Bundestag from 1980 to 2002. He is member of the Deutsche Parlamentarische Gesellschaft (German Parliamentary Association) and the Waldbauernverband Weser/Ems. From 1992 to 2000 he was president of organisation Arbeitsgemeinschaft Deutscher Waldbesitzerverbände seit 1948. Schorlemer is married with Monika Gatzen (born 1945) and has five children.

== Awards ==
- Order of Merit of the Federal Republic of Germany
