= Schorlemmer =

Schorlemmer is a surname. Notable people with the surname include:

- Carl Schorlemmer (1834–1892), German chemist
- Erna Schorlemmer (1875–1945), German composer
- Friedrich Schorlemmer (1944–2024), German Protestant theologian
- Heinz Schorlemmer (1906–1978), German actor

== See also ==
- Schorlemer
