= Marcel Hafke =

German politician (born 1982)

Member of the Landtag of North Rhine-Westphalia
- Incumbent
- Assumed office 9 June 2010

Personal details
- Born: 8 March 1982 (age 44) Bramsche
- Party: Free Democratic Party (since 2000)

Marcel Manfred Hafke (born 8 March 1982 in Bramsche) is a German politician serving as a member of the Landtag of North Rhine-Westphalia since 2010. He has served as chief whip of the Free Democratic Party since 2022.
