= Schloss Lieser =

Coordinates: 49°55′2″N 7°1′9″E

Schloss Lieser (Castle of Lieser) in the Mosel valley nearby Bernkastel-Kues is one of the most striking buildings within the village of Lieser, Germany. The building currently houses a 49-room Autograph Hotel, called Schloss Lieser, Autograph Collection.

== History ==
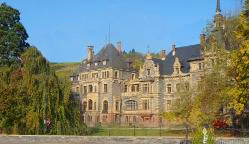

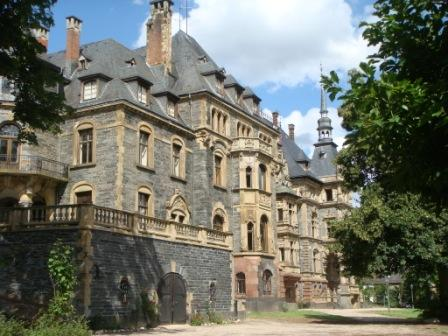

The castle was created on the site of a 1710-built church property.

Today's castle was designed by the architect Heinrich Theodor Schmidt in 1884–1887 as the residence for the family of the winery owner Eduard Puricelli. Eduard Puricelli founded and led several gas industries, including in Trier and also in the Rheinböller hut. Puricelli applied several times for Catholic and conservative parties to Members mandates and belonged to the constituent Reichstag of the North German Confederation. After the German-French war 1870–71 Puricelli continued for economic reasons, together with eleven other companies in Trier for the Annexation of Alsace-Lorraine.

Eduard Puricellis daughter Maria, sole heiress of parental possessions, married in 1880 the high Prussian officer Dr. Clemens Freiherr von Schorlemer-Alst/ Clemens Freiherr von Schorlemer-Lieser (1856–1922). Through its activities in the Prussian administrative services Clemens von Schorlemer made the acquaintance Kaiser Wilhelm II, who appreciated him.

In 1895/1904-1906 the castle was extended when Maria and Dr Clemens Freiherr von Schorlemer moved into the castle .

The castle consists out of two components, the older part in forms of Neo-Renaissance and the younger part in the forms of Art Nouveau.

== Outside ==
The outside side is influenced by the Neo-Renaissance, but in outline – according to the architect – Neo-Gothic. The jewellery forms bays, gables and towers are oriented to the German forms of Late Renaissance. The entrance is protected by a tower were two free-standing granite columns rise. The Risalit/Avant-corps on the left side of the main facade is Risalit by large, spread over two floors, is emphasized. The Madonna statue at the corner near the chapel comes from Peter Fuchs, who also worked at the Cologne Cathedral. On the main facade there are representations from the fields of industry and agriculture. For the stone construction Mosel slates and red – on the ground floor – brighter Udelfanger sandstone were used. The roof has been made from the slate quarries of Cauber Erbstollens.

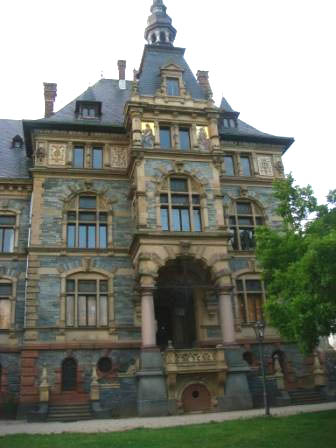

== Ground plan, ground floor and staircase ==
The ground plan is located between the Mosel river and the mountains, so that all rooms within the building – as in English country houses – are along a corridor. The basic design of the building with the octagonal hall is based on Italian villas of the 16th (Palladio) and 17th centuries.

The ground floor, in which mainly economic areas and the bottling plants were located, has been created very high for flood protection.

In the stairwell between eight large pilasters painted landscapes and architectural motifs from the Mosel region created by Karl Julius Grätz are located. The stairwell window with lead glazing has four painted medallions of Binsfeld and Janssen in Trier. The staircase itself is a self-construction of Trier sandstone with wrought-iron, partly gilded railings.

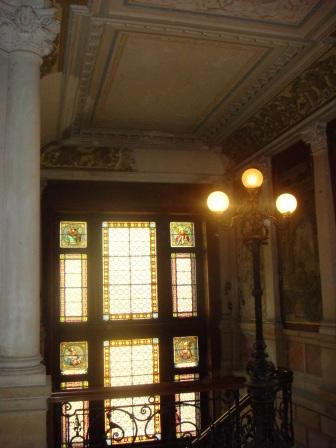

== First floor ==
The first floor is a Beletage with representation rooms. In the octagonal hall, where the stairs end, the sculptor's work, the pillars and the wall panelling have been created in light Burgreppacher sandstone. The ceiling has been plastered and contains several paintings. The first floor contains the rather sober work room, reception room, with pitch pine and oak wood-panelled dining room large with a rich and carved wooden ceiling and several doorframes, the small dining room for everyday use, a poolroom, several garden rooms, guest rooms and a kitchen.

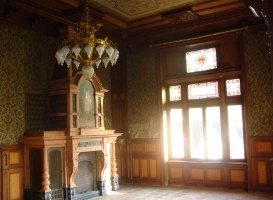

== Second floor ==
The second floor is the private sector of the house. Is had been equipped with livingrooms, sleepingrooms, tourist rooms and rooms for servants. It also contains a wall table and a marble fireplace. The copper plate of the fireplace has been decorated with a presentation of Hubert Salentin from Düsseldorf.

== Chapel ==
The hall of Beletage links to the chapel, which is a building on its own. The wallpaintings are by Karl Julius Grätz. The glass paintings are by Binsfeld and Janssen. Peter Fuchs created the saint statues. The mosaic floor with his figural representations was designed by the architect and produced in Mettlach.

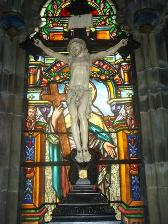

== The statue of the "housewife" and the other facilities ==
A special feature of the paintings is the image originally situated on the terrace sculpture of the wife of the owner. With her old German costume, keys and wallet in hand, it symbolizes allegorical excessive.

The carpentry work, furniture and other equipment details were drawings of the architects of Epple and Ege in Stuttgart. From the company M. Armbruster in Frankfurt the construction locks and art metalwork were created.

== The extension of 1895/1904-1906 ==
It is unclear whether the extension of the castle was created in 1904–1906, or already built in 1895 – the information differs. The historicism here takes the form of Art Nouveau. The main pavilion is a mid-wing, which served as a wintergarden. In front of the central axis of the three-pavilion construction a three-Söller has been placed. The entrance to a building along is followed by a concrete tower. Inside the extended building is in one of the two staircases, an Art Nouveau railing.
