= Bramsche =

- Town
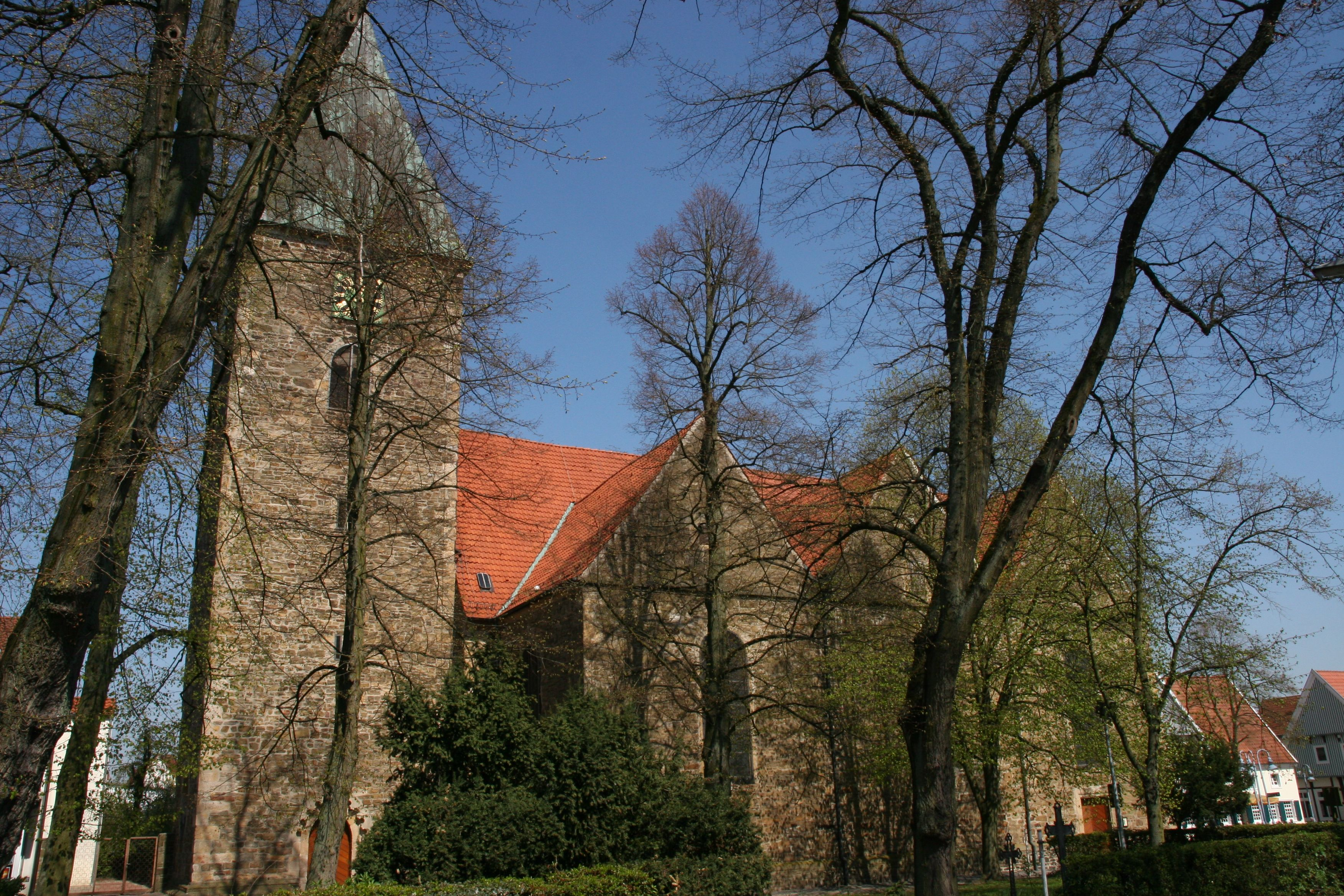
- Church in Bramsche

- Coat of arms

- Location of Bramsche within Osnabrück district
- Interactive map of Bramsche
- Location within Germany Location within Lower Saxony
- Coordinates: 52°24′N 7°59′E
- Country: Germany
- State: Lower Saxony
- District: Osnabrück

Government
  - Mayor (2021–26): Heiner Pahlmann (SPD)

Area
  - Total: 183.39 km^{2} (70.81 sq mi)
- Elevation: 44–157 m (144–515 ft)

Population (2025-12-31)
  - Total: 27,864
  - Density: 151.94/km^{2} (393.52/sq mi)
- Time zone: UTC+01:00 (CET)
  - Summer (DST): UTC+02:00 (CEST)
- Postal codes: 49565
- Dialling codes: 05461
- Vehicle registration: OS, BSB. MEL, WTL
- Website: bramsche.de

Bramsche (German pronunciation: [ˈbʁamʃə]) is a town in the district of Osnabrück, Lower Saxony, Germany. It is about 20 kilometres (12 miles) north of Osnabrück, at 52°24′N 7°59′E. Population is 30,952 (2018).

== Subdivisions ==
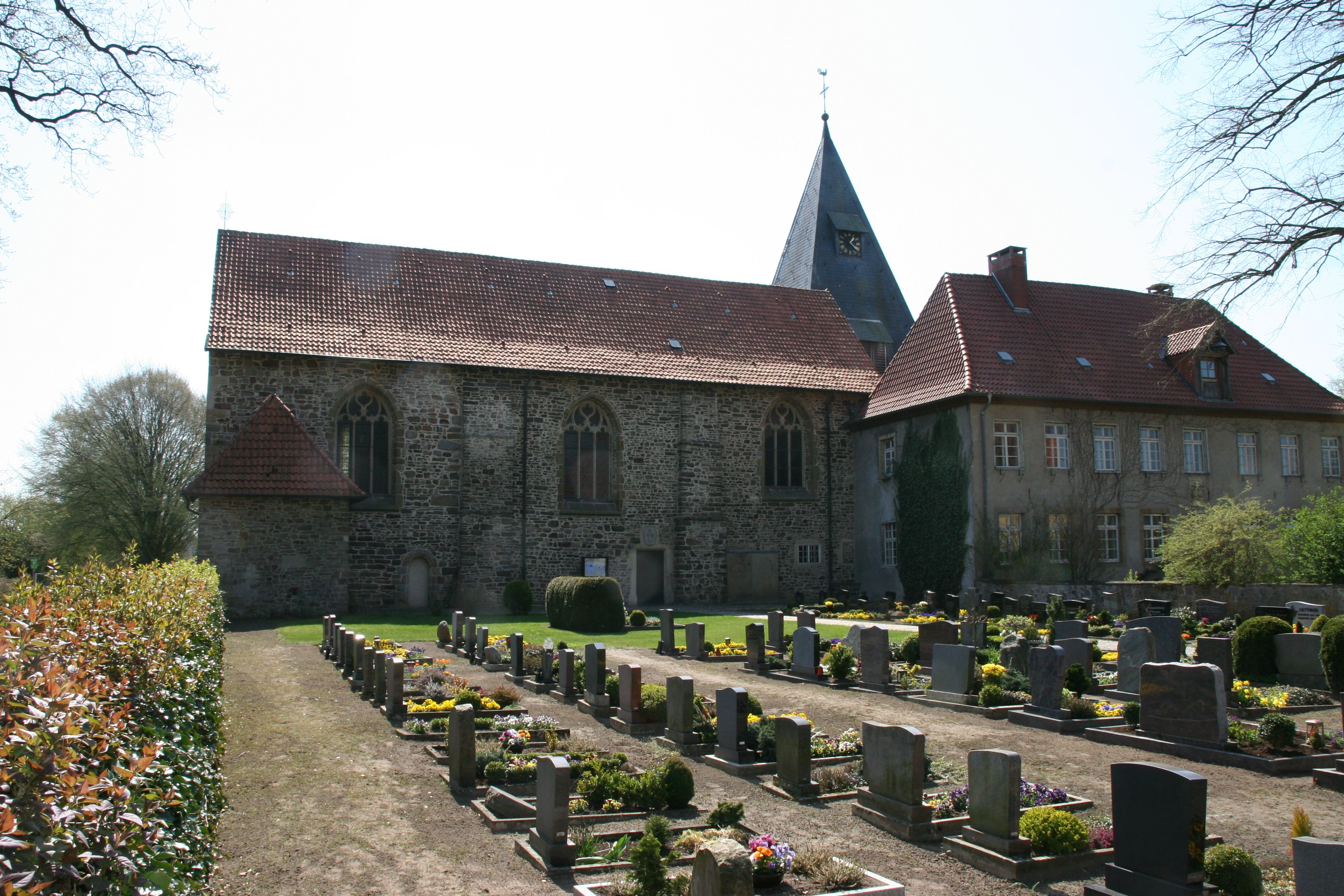
Bramsche Malgarten monastery

In 1971/72 12 previously independent municipalities were included into the town.

- Achmer
- Balkum
- Epe and Malgarten
- Engter
- Evinghausen
- Hesepe
- Kalkriese – site of the Battle of the Teutoburg Forest
- Lappenstuhl
- Pente
- Schleptrup
- Sögeln
- Ueffeln

== Mayors ==
The mayor of Bramsche is Heiner Pahlmann (SPD), re-elected in 2021. He was first elected in May 2014 with 63.0% of the votes. His predecessor Liesel Höltermann (SPD) did not run for mayor any more.

Year	Inhabitants
1961	22,728
1970	23,921
1987	24,225
1990	28,120
1995	30,724
2000	30,633
2005	31,006
2010	30,986
2015	36,013

== Twin towns – sister cities ==
Bramsche is twinned with:

- Biskupiec, Poland
- Harfleur, France
- Ra'anana, Israel
- Todmorden, England, United Kingdom

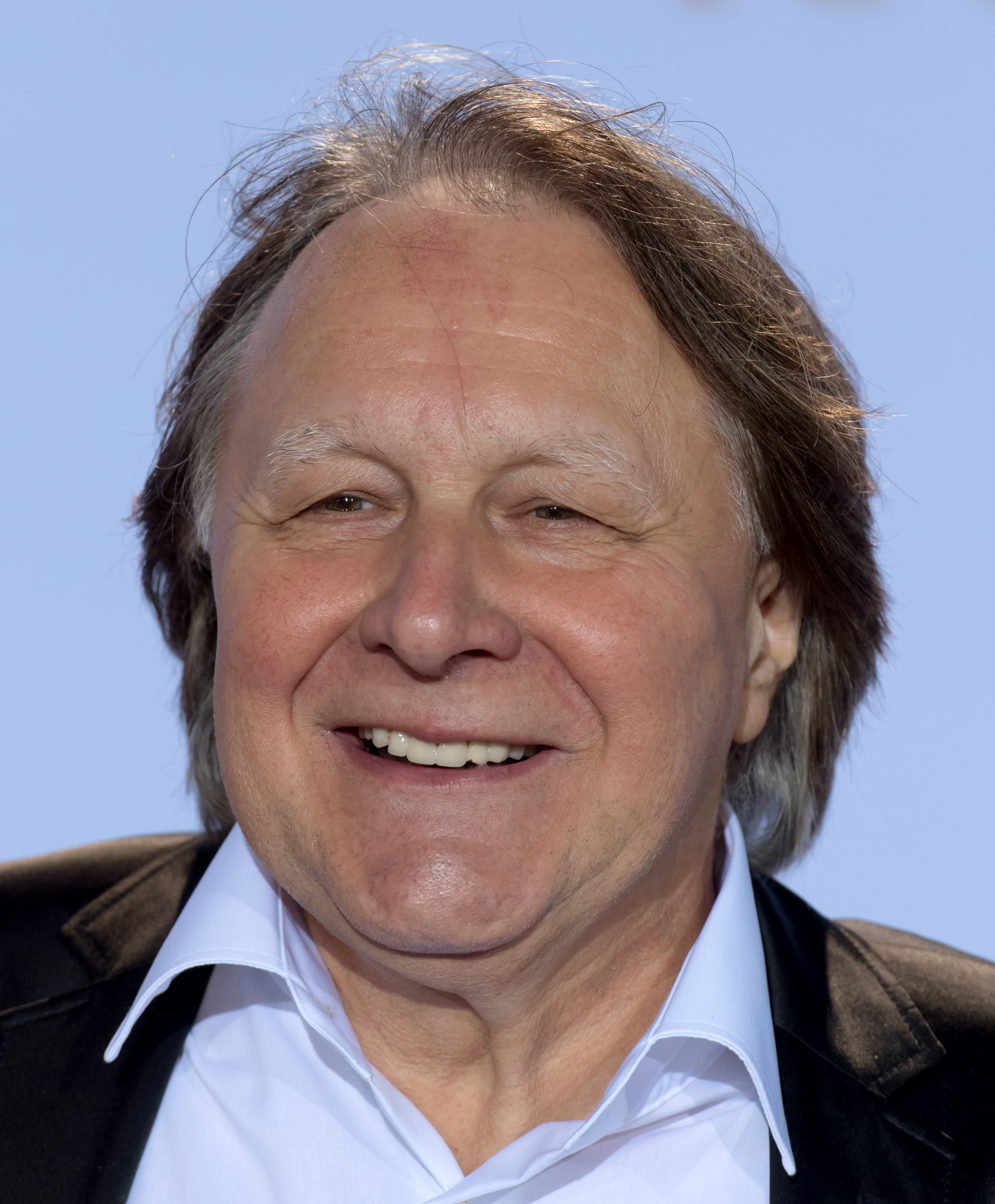
Peter Urban. 2016

== Notable people ==
- Peter Urban (born 1948), musician, radio and TV host
- Marieluise Beck (born 1952), politician (Alliance 90/The Greens), Member of Bundestag since 1983
- Anke Hennig (born 1964), politician (SPD) Member of the Bundestag since 2021. worked locally as a taxi driver.
- Filiz Polat (born 1978), politician (Alliance 90/The Greens)
- Marcel Hafke (born 1982), politician (FDP)
- Simon Tüting (born 1986), footballer, played 297 games
