= Bryan Brinkman =

American digital artist and animator

- Born: Bryan Brinkman; Omaha, Nebraska, U.S.
- Occupations: Animator; Digital artist
- Years active: 2007–present
- Known for: Digital art, NFTs
- Style: Digital pop
- Website: Official website

Bryan Brinkman is an American animator and digital artist known for his work in digital art, crypto art, and non-fungible tokens (NFTs). His practice combines animation, motion design, and technology-driven media, often exploring themes of identity, memory, and internet culture. His work has been exhibited internationally and included in auctions at institutions such as Christie's and Sotheby's.

== Biography ==
Brinkman grew up in Omaha, Nebraska. He studied animation at the University of the Arts in Philadelphia and later relocated to New York City.

== Style and career ==
Brinkman's work spans animation, digital art, and blockchain-based media. His artistic style is often associated with Pop art and contemporary digital art, incorporating colorful imagery and themes related to human emotion, perception, memory, and online identity.

After graduating, Brinkman began his career in advertising and television as a graphic artist and motion designer. He contributed to productions including The Tonight Show Starring Jimmy Fallon and Saturday Night Live, as well as projects for networks including MTV and Comedy Central.

In 2020, Brinkman began releasing artworks as NFTs, establishing a presence within the crypto art ecosystem through platforms such as SuperRare, Nifty Gateway, and Art Blocks.

In 2022, Brinkman was included in Most Influential by CoinDesk. That same year, he signed with Creative Artists Agency.

== Selected exhibitions and galleries ==
- Dreamverse – NFT.NYC (2021)
- Post-War to Present: The NFTs – Christie's, New York (2021)
- Natively Digital: A Curated NFT Sale – Sotheby's (2021)
- SuperRare Gallery, SoHo, New York City (2022)
- SCOPE Art Show, Miami Beach (2022)
- Saatchi Gallery, London (2023)
- Digital Dreams Gallery, Kansas City (2024)

== The Bryan Brinkman Experiment ==
On March 11, 2009, Brinkman was selected during a taping of Late Night with Jimmy Fallon to be followed on Twitter as part of "The Bryan Brinkman Experiment". Guests including Russell Brand, Alex Albrecht, Kevin Rose, and Questlove encouraged audiences to follow him. Within a few days, his account grew from seven followers to over 34,000.
