= Filiz Polat =

German politician (born 1978)

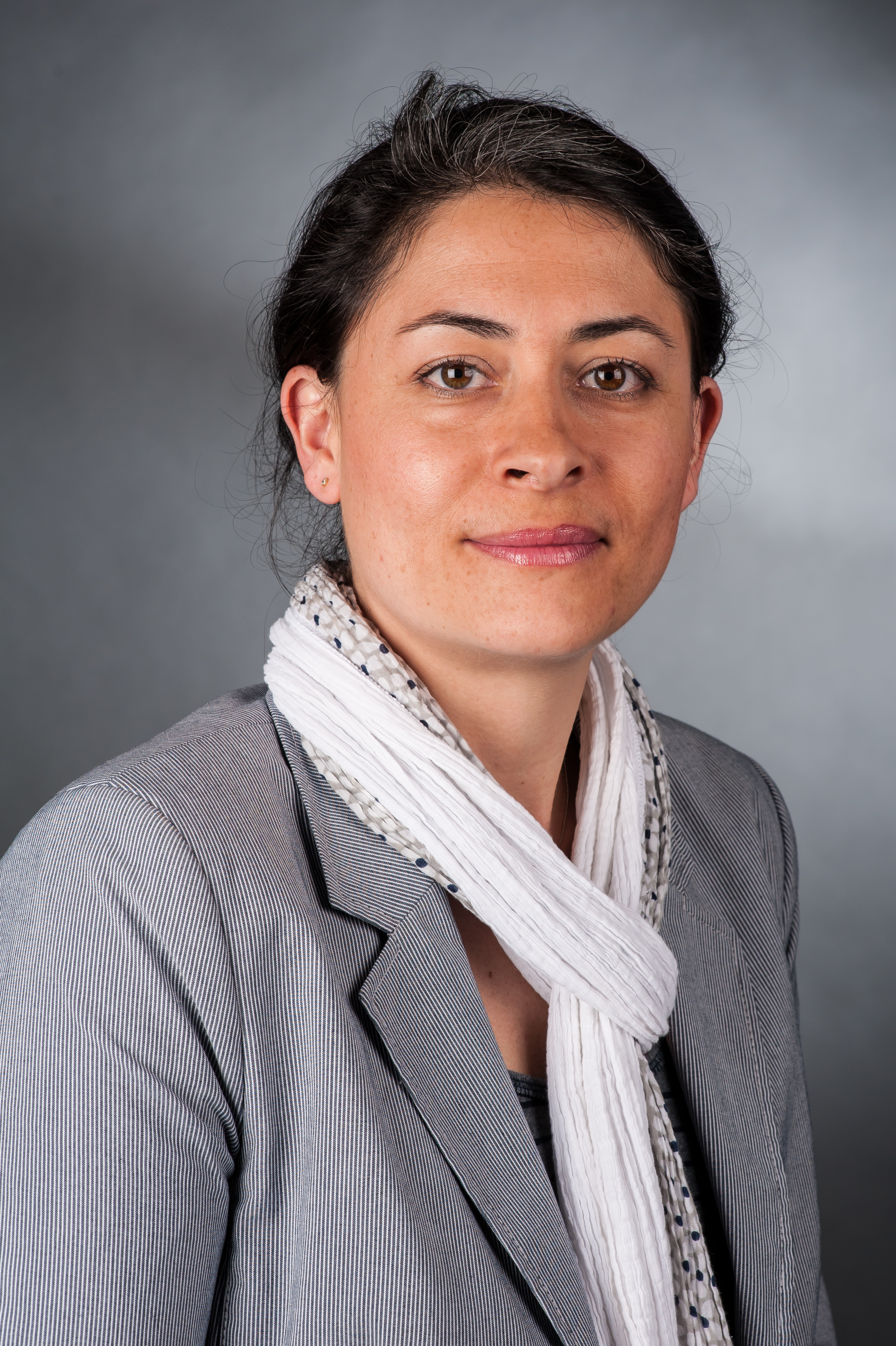
- Polat in 2013

Member of the Bundestag
- Incumbent
- Assumed office 2017

Personal details
- Born: 11 July 1978 (age 48) Bramsche, Lower Saxony, West Germany
- Party: Alliance 90/The Greens
- Education: Goethe University Frankfurt
- Occupation: Politician
- Profession: Economist
- Website: www.filiz-polat.de/home.html

Filiz Polat (born 11 July 1978) is a German politician for the Alliance 90/The Greens.

== Early years ==
Polat was born on 11 July 1978 in Bramsche, a town in Osnabrück District, Germany, to a Turkish physician father and a German regional politician mother.

She was schooled in Bramsche where she also attended high school. She finished her secondary education in Münster with Abitur and studied Economics at the Goethe University Frankfurt graduating with a thesis on "Employment Effects of Technological Change: A Micro-econometric Approach" in 2002. That year, she administered also an intermediate exam in Political Science.

== Political career ==
In 1996, Polat co-founded the Green Youth in her hometown Brasche and joined the party Alliance 90/The Greens. She was active as a member in the city council of Bramsche between 1996 and 2001. From 2005 to 2007, she served as the deputy chairperson of the regional organization in Lower Saxony.

=== Member of the State Parliament, 2004–2017 ===
Polat ran in the 2003 regional election for Green Party; however, she missed the entry into the Landtag of Lower Saxony by one place on the electoral list. When Rebecca Harms, the chairperson of the parliamentary group of the Green Party, moved into the European Parliament, Polat took her seat as replacement on 15 September 2004. She was re-elected in the 2008 election in Lower Saxony. Polat became the deputy chairperson of her party's parliamentary group in February 2013. From 2006 Polat also served on the city council of Bramsche again.

Polat served as spokesperson of her party's parliamentary group for policies of migration, Europe and cultural heritage management. Furthermore, she was a member of the Committees on Petitions and European Affairs.

=== Member of the Bundestag, 2017–present ===
Polat has been a member of the German Bundestag since the 2017 national elections. She has since been serving on the Committee on Internal Affairs. She also serves as her parliamentary group’s spokesperson for migration issues.

In addition to her committee assignments, Polat has been serving as deputy chairwoman of the German-Pacific Parliamentary Friendship Group, which maintains interparliamentary relations with Australia, New Zealand, Papua New Guinea and Timor-Leste. Since 2022, she has also been a member of the German delegation to the Parliamentary Assembly of the Council of Europe (PACE). In the Assembly, she serves on the Committee on Equality and Non-Discrimination.

In 2020, Polat co-founded a cross-party working group on diversity and antiracism.

Ahead of the 2021 elections, Polat was elected to lead the Green Party's campaign in Lower Saxony, alongside Sven-Christian Kindler. In the negotiations to form a so-called traffic light coalition of the Social Democratic Party (SPD), the Green Party and the Free Democratic Party (FDP) following the elections, she was part of her party's delegation in the working group on migration and integration, co-chaired by Boris Pistorius, Luise Amtsberg and Joachim Stamp.

== Other activities ==
- Islamkolleg Deutschland (IKD), Member of the Board of Trustees (since 2021)
- Federal Agency for Civic Education (BPB), Alternate Member of the Board of Trustees (2018–2021)
- Niedersächsische Lotto-Sport-Stiftung, Member of the Board of Trustees (–2019)
- Verband Entwicklungspolitik Niedersachsen (VEN), Member
