= Burghard Freiherr von Schorlemer-Alst =

German politician (1825–1895)

Burghard Freiherr von Schorlemer-Alst (26 October 1825, Heringhausen, Westphalia – 17 March 1895, Alst) was a Prussian parliamentarian for the Centre Party. He was married with Anna von Imbsen zu Wewer (1829-1891) and had three children:

- Friedrich (1854–1934), prussian politician ∞ Wilhelmine von Hartmann (* 1859)
- Clemens (1856–1922), prussian agrarian minister ∞ Maria Puricelli (* 1. Februar 1855; † 1936)
- Hubert (1856–1930), leutnant

From 1870 to 1889 he was member of Prussian House of Representatives. Since 1891 he was member of Prussian House of Lords. From 1874 to 1885 he was also member of German Reichstag.
