= Matthias Seestern-Pauly =

German politician

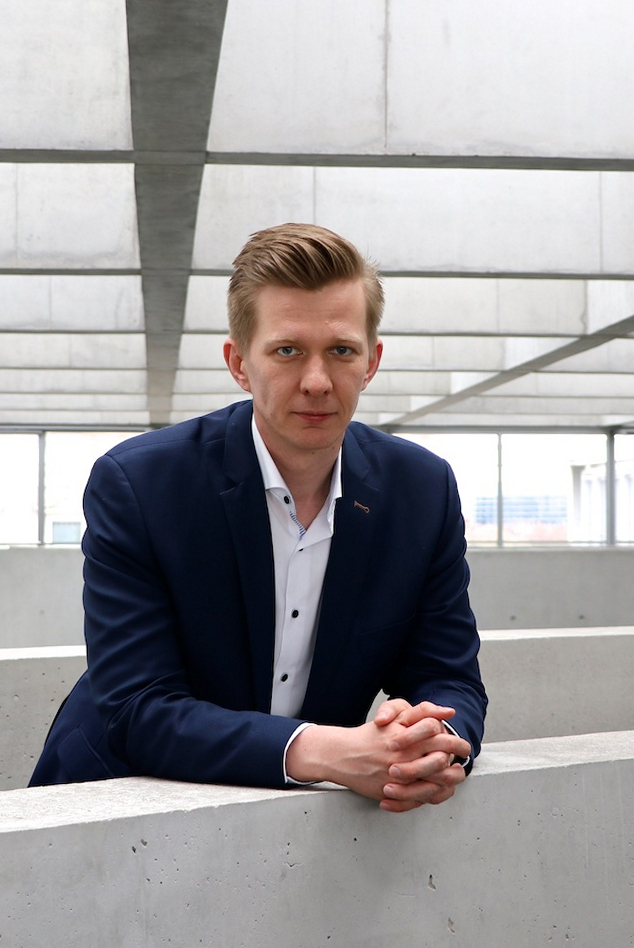
- Matthias Seestern-Pauly in 2019

Member of the Bundestag
- In office 2017–2025

Personal details
- Born: 28 February 1984 (age 42) West Germany (now Germany)
- Party: FDP
- Children: 2
- Education: University of Osnabrück
- Occupation: Teacher

Matthias Seestern-Pauly (born 28 February 1984) is a German teacher and politician of the Free Democratic Party (FDP) who served as a member of the Bundestag from the state of Lower Saxony from 2017 to 2025.

== Early life and career ==
Born in Osnabrück, Seestern-Pauly finished school in 2004 with the Abitur at the Gymnasium Bad Iburg and then completed his civilian service. From 2006 to 2011 Seestern-Pauly studied to become a teacher in Osnabrück and Vechta. He completed his studies as Master of Education in the subjects German and History. After his legal clerkship he worked as a teacher at the Gymnasium Ursulaschule Osnabrück since 2014.

== Political career ==
Seestern-Pauly became a member of the Bundestag in the 2017 German federal election.

In parliament, Seestern-Pauly served on the Committee on Family Affairs, Senior Citizens, Women and Youth, where he was his parliamentary group’s coordinator. Since 1 February 2020 he has been chairman of the Children's Commission. He was also an alternate member of the Committee on Education, Research and Technology Assessment. He served as his parliamentary group's spokesman for child and youth policy (2018–2018) and for families (2021–2025).

In November 2024, Seestern-Pauly announced that he would not stand in the 2025 federal elections.

== Other activities ==
- Federal Agency for Civic Education (BPB), Member of the Board of Trustees
