= Lutz Brinkmann =

German politician

Lutz Brinkmann MdB

Member of the Bundestag; for Osnabrück-Land
- Incumbent
- Assumed office 25 March 2025
- Preceded by: Ingrid Pahlmann

Personal details
- Born: 27 December 1975 (age 50) Ankum, West Germany
- Party: Christian Democratic Union
- Children: 3

Lutz Brinkmann (born 27 December 1975) is a German politician from the Christian Democratic Union (CDU). He was elected as a member of the German Bundestag in the 2025 federal election. He was the direct candidate in the Osnabrück-Land constituency where he received 36.6% of the first vote.
