= André Berghegger =

German politician (born 1972)

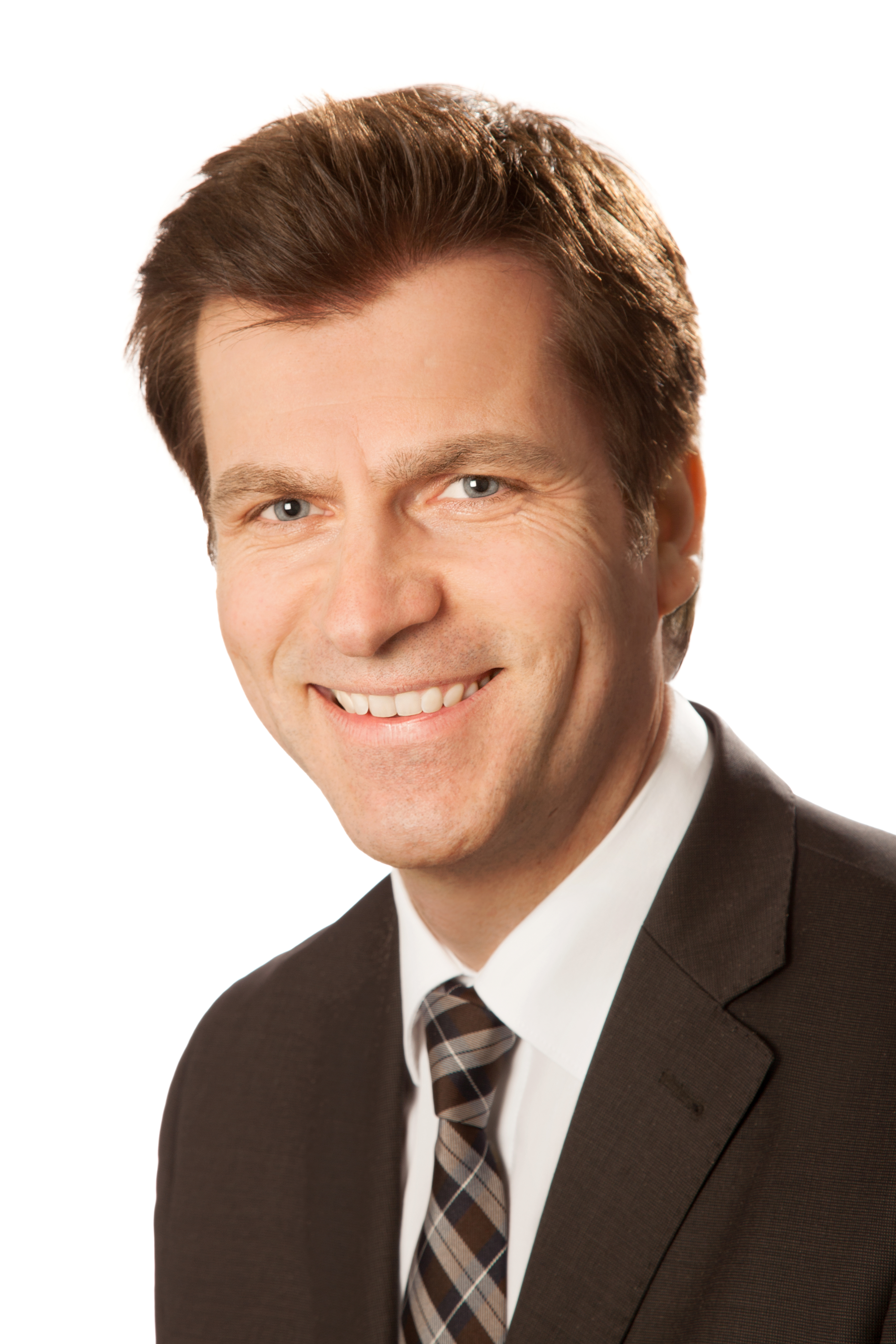
- Berghegger in 2013

Member of the Bundestag; for Osnabrück-Land
- In office 22 October 2013 – 31 December 2023
- Preceded by: Georg Schirmbeck
- Succeeded by: Ingrid Pahlmann

Personal details
- Born: 11 July 1972 (age 54) Osnabrück, West Germany
- Party: Christian Democratic Union
- Children: 2
- Education: University of Osnabrück

André Berghegger (born 5 July 1972) is a German politician of the Christian Democratic Union (CDU). From 2006 to 2013, he was mayor of the city of Melle.

== Education and early career ==
From 1978 to 1984, Berghegger attended the elementary school and orientation in Ostercappeln. From 1984 to 1991, he graduated from high school in Bad Essen. After he had completed his military service from 1991 to 1992, he did vocational training in the upper general administrative service in the district of Osnabrück from 1992 to 1995.

From 1995 to 2000, Berghegger studied law at the University of Osnabrück. From 2000 to 2002, he completed his legal clerkship. He then completed his doctorate from 2002 to 2003 at the University of Osnabrück under Professor Jörn Ipsen. Berghegger was from 2004 to 2006 chief financial officer and, from 2006 to 2013, full-time mayor of the city of Melle. Since 22 October 2013 until 15 November 2023, he had been a member of the German Bundestag.André Berghegger, CDU/CSU, Bundestag

== Political career ==
Berghegger joined the CDU in 1996. From 1996 to 2001, he was a member of the local council of Ostercappeln for his party. In October 2012, he was elected deputy chairman of the district association of the CDU in the district of Osnabrück.

In the 2013 federal elections, Berghegger was the direct candidate of his party for the Bundestag constituency Osnabrück-Land and won the mandate with 53.1% of the first votes. In parliament, he is a full member of the Budget Committee and the Audit Committee. On the Budget Committee, he has been his parliamentary group's rapporteur on the budgets of the Federal Ministry of Finance and the Federal Court of Auditors. On the Audit Committee, he covers the budgets of the Federal Ministry of Justice and Consumer Protection. Since 2018, he has been leading his group on both committees.

In addition to his committee assignments, Berghegger is a member of the Parliamentary Friendship Group for Relations with the Baltic States.

Following the 2017 elections, Berghegger unsuccessfully challenged Mathias Middelberg as head of the group of CDU parliamentarians from Lower Saxony.

== Other activities ==
- KfW, Member of the Board of Supervisory Directors (since 2020)
- Nuclear Waste Disposal Fund, alternate member of the Board of Trustees (since 2017)
- Institute for Federal Real Estate (BImA), member of the Supervisory Board (since 2014)
- Kreissparkasse Melle, member of the Supervisory Board (since 2006)

== Political positions ==
In June 2017, Berghegger voted against Germany's introduction of same-sex marriage.

== Personal life ==
Berghegger is married and has two children.
