= Tripsta S.A. =

Tripsta S.A. was the parent company of tripsta, airtickets and travelplanet24, online travel agencies that provided transportation services, including airlines, ferry and train services, through its websites.

At its height Tripsta S.A. operated in over 45 countries and territories and in over 34 languages.

The company collapsed in 2018.

== History ==
Tripsta S.A. was founded in 2005, originally under the brand name travelplanet24, by Philipp Brinkmann (CEO) and Kristof Keim (CCO) in Athens, Greece. In 2010, Tripsta S.A. was formed in response to European expansion. Tripsta S.A. maintained its headquarters in Athens and had a remote office in Bucharest.

By 2010, Tripsta S.A. entered Poland, its first foreign market, and by 2015 had expanded to forty-five additional markets.

In 2014, the company received €3.5 million in growth funding from the European Investment Fund.

In March 2015, Tripsta S.A. acquired and integrated its competitor airtickets. The acquisition made Tripsta S.A. the largest ecommerce company in Greece. It consolidated the technology and customer base of the two companies.

As of 2017, the company served over one million customers and had gross bookings exceeding €500 million.

=== Suspension of operations ===
Citing a "massive liquidity problem", Tripsta S.A. suspended operations in June 2018 when it was unable to repay debts up to €70 million to IATA and its members. As a result, airtickets.gr converted its operation into a metasearch engine and travelplanet24 was restricted into selling solely ferry tickets. Additionally it aimed to close down their office in Romania affecting around 100 employees. Tripsta blamed partner Travelport for this outcome and initiated legal actions against it, with Travelport denying the accusations. Airtickets.gr founder Dimitris Kontogeorgos publicly blamed Tripsta for failing to protect the reputation of airtickets.gr, as he claimed that Tripsta allowed its financial problems to be linked to airtickets.gr.

Tripsta has not subsequently resumed operations. The airtickets.gr portal and the ferry operations of travelplanet24 continue.

== Brands ==
- Travelplanet24 (operated solely in the Greek market)
- airtickets (operated in 17 counties)
- NL Group (operated in 4 counties)
- Tripsta (operated in 46 counties)
