= Peter Fuchs =

German sculptor

Peter Fuchs (1829–1898) was a German sculptor.

== Biography ==
From 1844 to 1849 Peter Fuchs was an apprentice mason in the Cologne Dombauhütte and for the next two years he worked as a mason for St. Nicolai in Hamburg and in the studio of Vincenz Statz in Cologne.

From 1851 to 1854 he worked in Speyer with the sculptor Gottfried Renn (1818–1880) and in Frankfurt am Main with Eduard Schmidt von der Launitz (1797–1869) and Eduard Jakob von Steinle.

In 1855 Peter Fuchs returned to Cologne, where he created such large sandstone reliefs and statue groups as the Four Prophets (1858) for the Mariensäule in the Gereonsdriesch and the life-size figures of SS Dionysius and Reinold (1866–1871) for the west front of St. Mauritius.

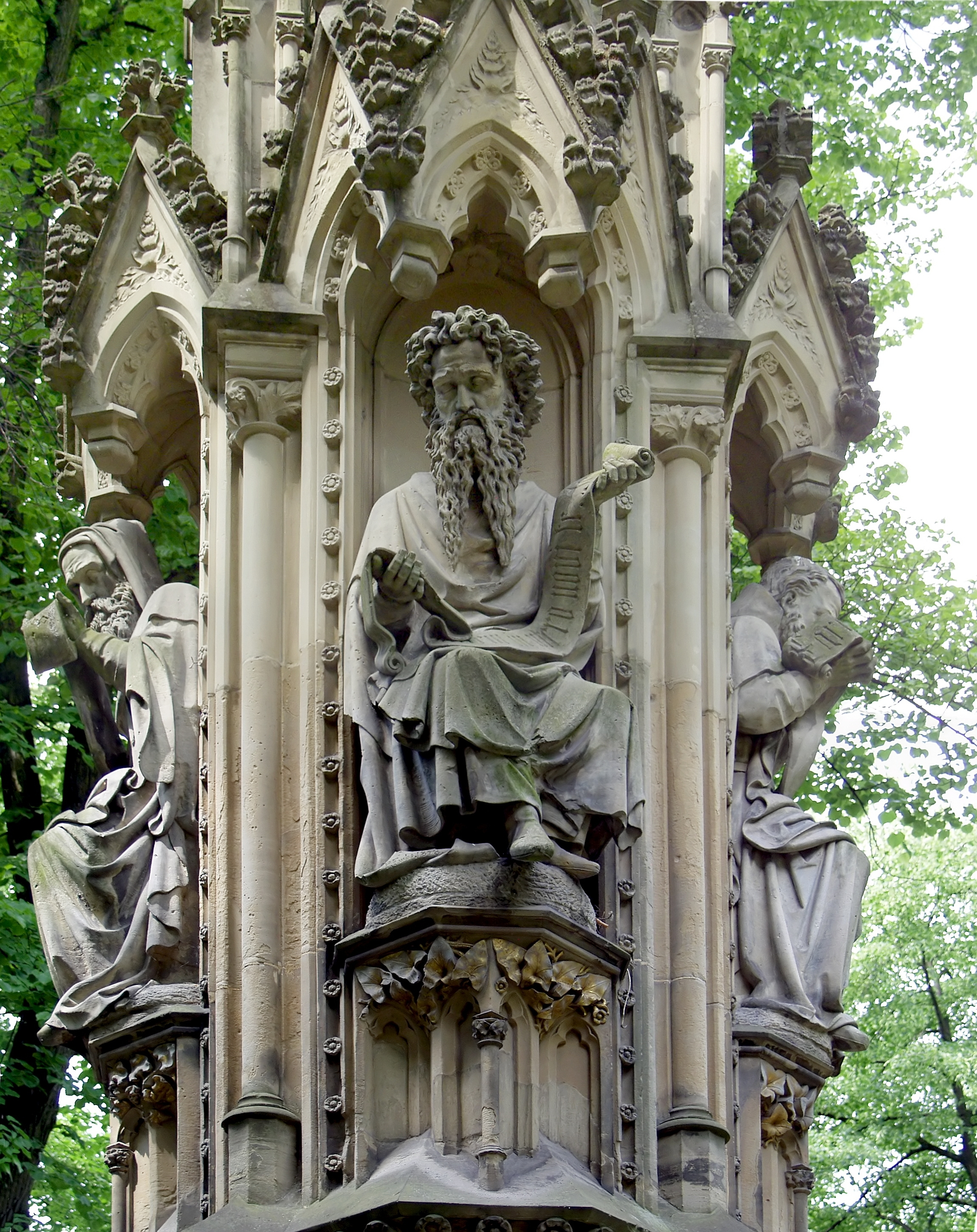

From 1865 to 1881 he produced some 700 life-size and slightly over-life-size sculptures for Cologne Cathedral, mostly reliefs and seated and standing figures depicting scenes from the Bible and lives of the saints. Many of these are to be found on the columns and walls of the south transept (1866–1872), the west towers (1871), the west front and the north front (1879–1881) and the Petersportal (1881). Several preliminary drawings (1879–1880) for uncompleted sculptures are located in the Dombauarchiv.

Influenced by the Nazarenes, after 1870 Peter Fuchs lengthened his figures and encased them in garments with sharp-edged, graphic folds. He was also influenced by the work of contemporary German sculptors working in the monumental style, as can be seen in the rendering of naturalistic heads and pathetic expression and in the isolation of the figures from each other. The reliefs and statues of Old and New Testament prophets (1895–1898) from the tympanum and the bronze doors of the west front of Bremen Cathedral, with their attenuated stances and pronounced folds of drapery, show his debt to the figures in Ghiberti's Gates of Paradise (Florence, Mus. Opera Duomo) and to the sculptures of the Beuron Art School of the last third of the 19th century.
