= East Canton High School =

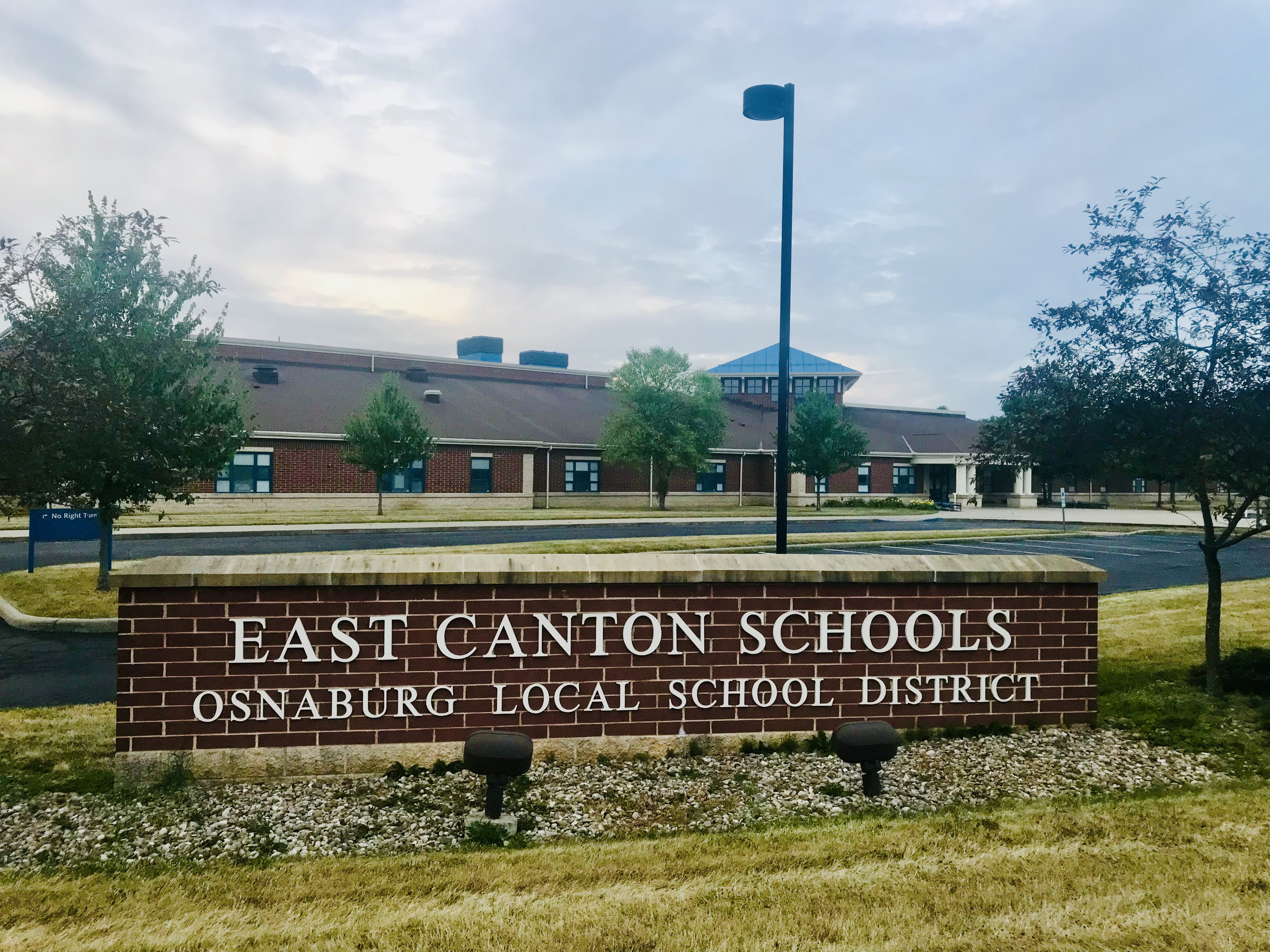

Location
- 310 Browning Street; East Canton, Ohio 44730; United States; 40°47′22″N 81°16′49″W

Information
- Type: Public
- Grades: 9–12
- Enrollment: 254 (2024–25)
- Colors: Blue and gold
- Athletics conference: Inter-Valley Conference
- Team name: Hornets
- Website: www.osnaburglocal.org/page/high-school

East Canton High School is a public high school in East Canton, Ohio. It is the only high school in the Osnaburg Local School District.

== Athletics ==
=== State championships ===
- Boys cross country – 1998, 2017, 2020, 2021
- Boys track and field - 2017, 2018, 2019

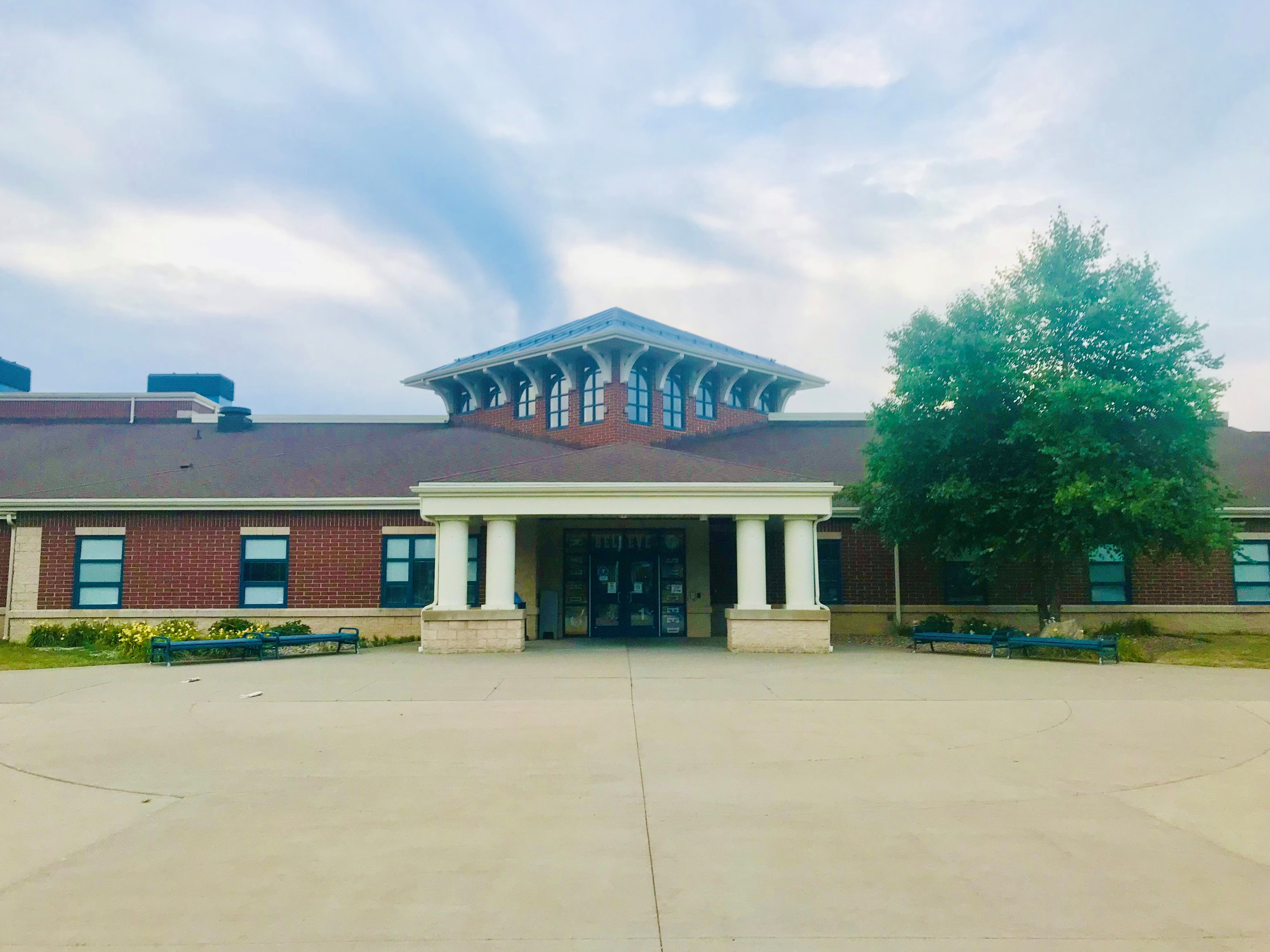
Front entrance

== Notable alumni ==
- Jean Peters, Class of 1944; film actress
