= Clemens Freiherr von Schorlemer-Lieser =

German politician

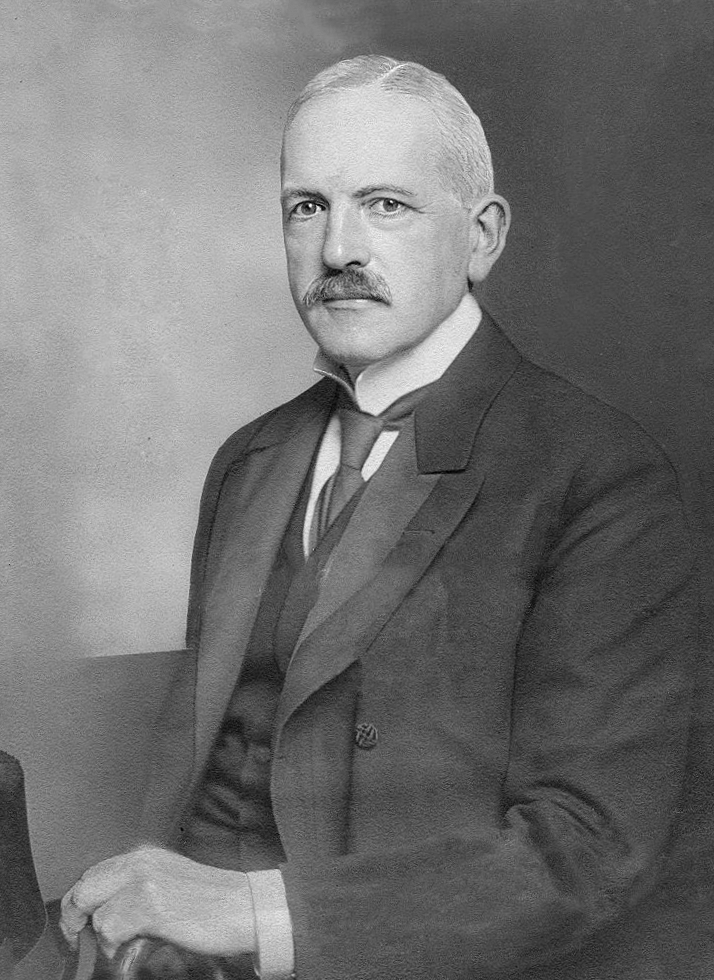
Clemens Freiherr von Schorlemer-Lieser in 1917

Clemens August Freiherr von Schorlemer-Lieser (29 September 1856 – 6 July 1922) was a German politician.

== Historical background ==
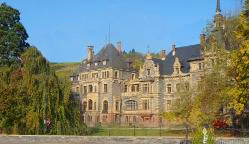
Castle Lieser

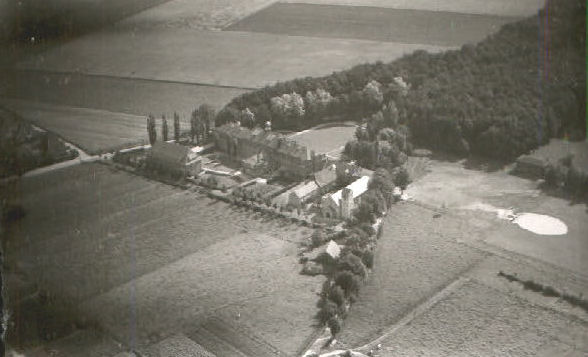
Gut Vehr, Quakenbrück, around 1920er

Freiherr von Schorlemer was born in Horstmar. After he graduated from the Gymnasium Dionysianum in Rheine in 1874, he studied law in Würzburg and Göttingen. In 1878 he achieved his doctorate and went into military service. In 1880 he married the wealthy Mary Puricelli, who later inherited millions in assets. Together they bought a vineyard in the Mosel at Lieser. There they built a castle, Schloss Lieser.

In 1886 Schorlemer gained administrative experience with the prosecuting authorities in Bonn and Düsseldorf. From 1886 to 1888, he was a Regierungsassessor in Magdeburg. On 1 December 1888, at the Kreistag Neuss, Schorlemer was unanimously elected as a member of the council. In Neuss he established his first solid relationships with social groups. Politically, he supported several projects, starting the 1889 Holiday Colonies. The Cravatten-Tech School in Neuss was based upon his ideas. In 1893, he became Schützenkönig. In addition, he had a circular house built in Neuss, which was inaugurated in 1894.

His father, Burghard Freiherr von Schorlemer-Alst, was a representative of the Centre Party in the German Reichstag. In 1890 and 1893, Schorlemer stood as an independent candidate, before being selected as candidate by the antisemitic German Social Party. In 1893, he achieved 37.5% of the vote in Neuss.

In 1897, Schorlemer was sent to Breslau, where he took a post in the regional government of the Upper Silesian Regierungsbezirk but left the civil service in 1899 to dedicate himself to managing the family estate. Schorlemer was appointed to the Prussian House of Lords in 1901, a seat he retained until the empire's collapse in 1918.

On 19 August 1905, at the personal request of Emperor Wilhelm II, Schorlemer was appointed as the first Catholic Oberpräsident of the Rhine Province. Henceforth, he resided in the capital, Koblenz. During a visit to Neuss he received his honorary citizenship rights, which he also received in Koblenz and St. Wendel in 1910.

On 18 June 1910, Schorlemer became Prussian Minister of Agriculture, a post he held until 1917. The following year he was nominated by the Chamber of Agriculture as chairman for the Rhine Province. In 1913, as Minister of Agriculture, he accused the Polish clergy of fomenting nationalism in Prussian Poland. Shortly after the passage of a Germanization bill in 1913, he indicated that a subsequent bill would allow for the partition of individual estates in Poland.

From April 1920, Schorlemer was Kreisdeputierter in the district of Bernkastel.

He was married with Maria Puricelli (1855–1936), lived with his family at Castle Lieser and had five children:

- Friedrich-Leo (1894–1915)
- August (1885–1940)
- Helene (1882–1938)

∞ Joseph von Fürstenberg (1868–1904), prussian leutnant ∞ Hugo Montgelas (1866–1916)

- Maria (1888–1959) ∞ Karl von Kageneck (1871–1967), generalmajor
- Elisabeth (1898–1979) ∞ Kurt von Oswald (1892–1971)

Near to city Quakenbrück in Lower Saxony he owned Gut Vehr. He died in 1922 at the Hedwig Hospital in Berlin.
