= Nikolaus Ehlen =

- Born: December 9, 1886; Graach an der Mosel
- Died: October 18, 1965 (aged 78); Velbert

Nikolaus Ehlen (born 9 December 1886 in Graach an der Mosel, died 8 October 1965 in Velbert) was a German pacifist teacher. He was a Catholic pioneer of the Selbsthilfe-Siedlungsbau, which was a movement to help workers get their own home.

== Life ==
Nikolaus Ehlen was born as the son of a wine-grower in Graach an der Mosel near Bernkastel. Already in his youth he felt the urge to become a priest, and after his Abitur he enrolled in the Priestergymnasium (institute of higher education for people wishing to become a priest) in Trier. After two semesters of studying theology, he changed his plans and enrolled at the Westfälische Wilhelms-Universität Münster in physics, chemistry, mathematics and philosophy. He was a student of Joseph Geyser. He completed his PhD in philosophy and natural sciences in 1914.

After his Staatsexamen and Promotion, he worked at the Hohenzollern-Gymnasium in Sigmaringen as a Studienassessor (some rank of teacher). From November 1916 on he participated in World War I as a volunteer in the Champagne and at Verdun. Afterwards, he continued to be an Assessor in Sigmaringen until he accepted a position as Oberlehrer and Studienrat (higher rank of teacher) for mathematics and chemistry in the town of Velbert.He continued to teach until his retirement in 1953. Influenced by the writings of Friedrich Wilhelm Foerster, it was important to him to teach his students self-knowledge and "self-education". His "Reformpädagogik" (reform movement in teaching which at this time in Germany was usually quite authoritarian and military-style) is illustrated by the following anecdote as told by himself:

One day, there was a well-drawn caricature of a teacher on the blackboard in my Obertertia [9th grade]. The director (the one with the black frock coat and the sparkling white collar) comes to me outraged: "What a disgrace for this class and the school! We will find the author. Otherwise [sic!] he will be punished very hard." I asked the director for full freedom in the investigation. Then I talked to my class. I praised the well-made painting. - "But this whole thing must be very painful for the old Professor (teachers were called professors at this time) who is depicted on the blackboard! You are way to decent for such an insult to him. This afternoon, I expect the student who drew this in my flat". And he came. Together, we decided on his punishment. From this day on, I had the unrestricted trust of the old director and of my class.

== Family ==
He had eight children (Maria, Ludwig, Ruth, Norbert, Elisabeth, Johannes, Genoveva (Veva) and Nikolaus) from his marriage to Maria Stummel; they also fostered two children.

== Political positions ==
His older friend and mentor Ernst Thrasolt introduced Ehlen to the ideas of the Catholic youth movement, which formed shortly before WW I, parallel to the already existing groups of the Wandervogel. Ehlen distinguished himself with lasting effect in this young movement. His maxims were based on the Lebensreform (German reform movement which criticised the industrialisation and wanted to go "back to nature") and the sermon on the mount as well as on closeness to nature and an attachment to his home-country.

Under the influence of Tharsolt, he found his way to the Friedensbund Deutscher Katholiken (German Catholic Peace League), and was also a member of the Internationaler Versöhnungsbund (International Fellowship of Reconciliation, IFOR). At first, he was also a member of the Zentrumspartei (German Centre Party, Catholic party in the empire and the Weimar republic), but was expelled later. He was the leading candidate for the radically pacifist Christlich-Soziale Reichspartei in the Reichstag election of 1928. The 11.000 votes he got were however not sufficient for a seat in the parliament.

Because of his pacifist attitude which aimed at the reconciliation of nations, he was taunted, detained and banned from writing by the Nazis. In 1933, he was detained for a short period, and signed a declaration to drop the pacifist outlook of the journal Lotsenrufe he published (in 1939, it was completely banned by the Nazis), but remained unbroken, which can be seen from his speech for the defence, which was posthumously published in fragments. From World War II, he returned as a lieutenant of the artillery.

Ehlen supported the Hemberg Settlement and co-founded the Stübbeken Settlement in Letmathe.

He became important as a pioneer of the Selbsthilfe-Siedlungsbau. Thousands of workers, organised in his Ring Deutscher Siedler (1961), owe him their family-friendly home on their own parcel of land. State and church recognised his merits. After his death in Velbert on 16 October 1965, then-Wohnungsbauminster (minister for housing) Paul Lücke commemorated his influence on western German housing politics in the post-war period.

== Quotation ==
Nobody must be forced to join the military service against the majesty of his personal conscience.

== Honours ==
- 1951: Bundesverdienstkreuz (Steckkreuz)
- 1961: Großes Bundesverdienstkreuz
- His former high school is now named after him.
- A street in Velbert is named after him.

== See also ==
- List of peace activists
