= Schloss Veldenz =

Coordinates: 49.884°N 7.039°E

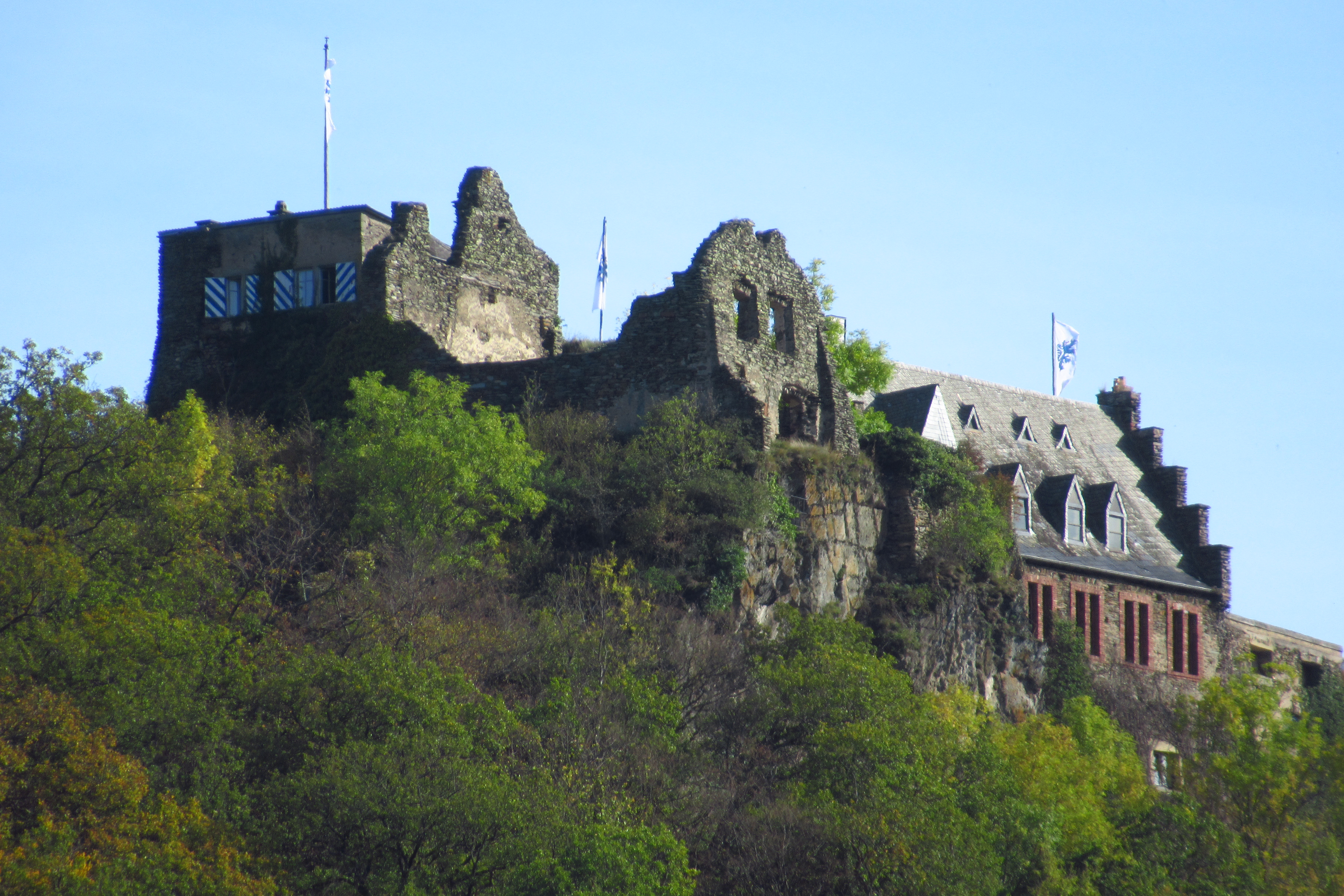
Schloss Veldenz, 2019

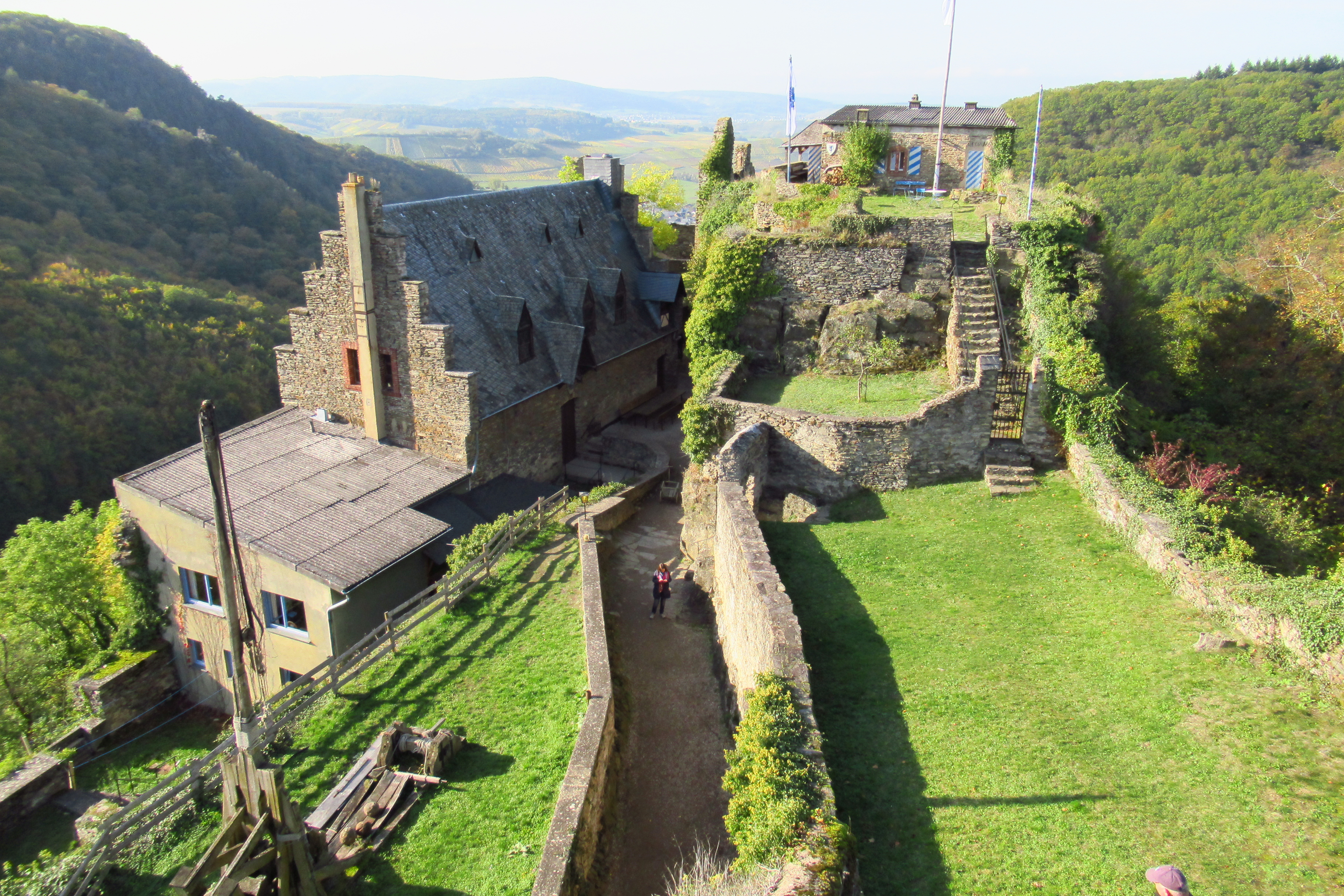
The ruins of Schloss Veldenz, 2019

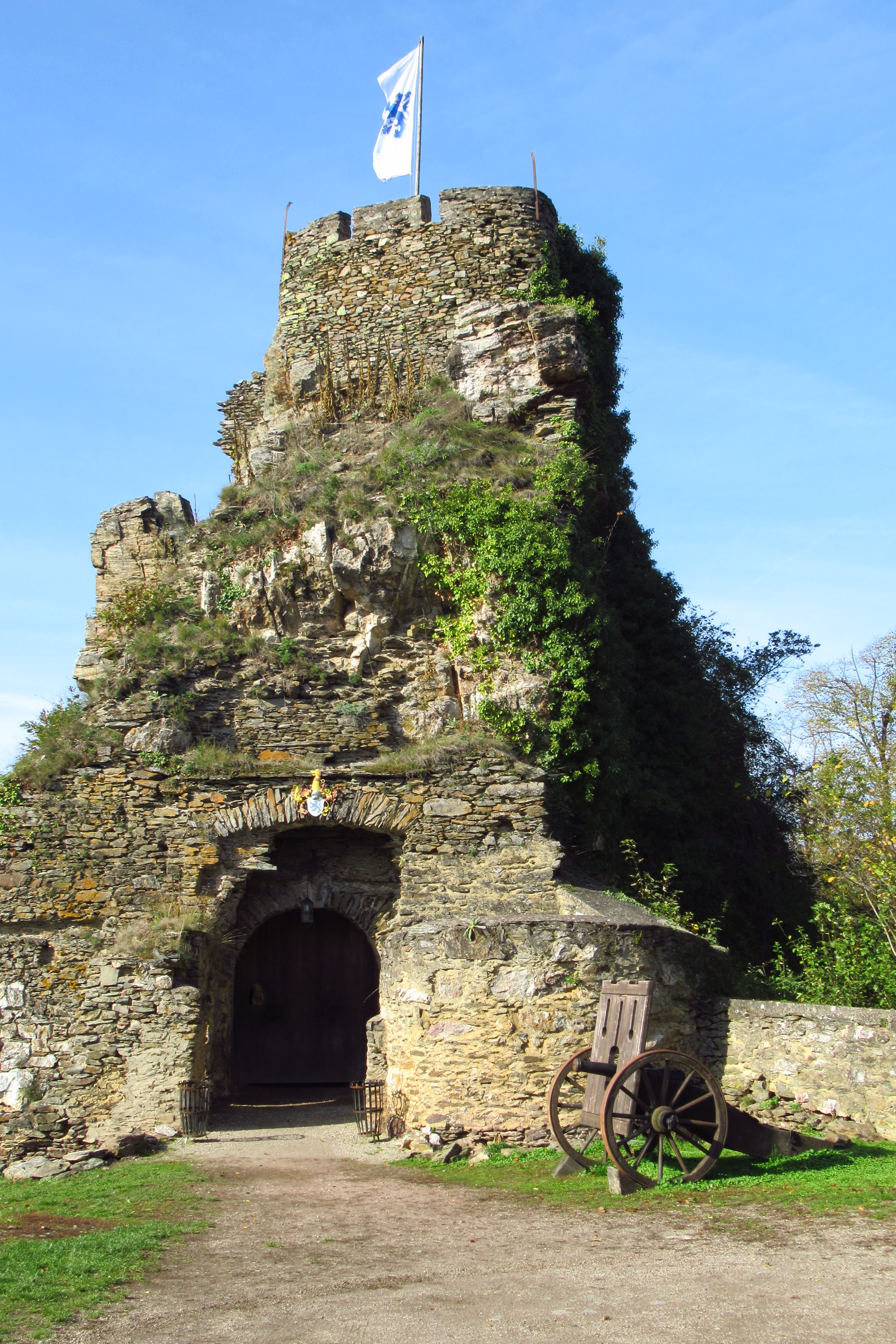

Schloss Veldenz in the Hunsrück upland, on a steep vale draining into the Mosel is a castle ruin about 1.5 kilometres (0.9 mi) southeast of the village of Veldenz in the German state of Rhineland-Palatinate.

== Location ==
The site is in the district of Bernkastel-Wittlich in Rhineland-Palatinate (Rheinland-Pfalz). It is on a hill spur, roughly 320 metres (1,050 ft) above sea level and 180 metres (590 ft) above the level of the Mosel.

It is on northern hills of the Hunsrück in a side valley of the Mosel through which the Veldenzer Bach flows. The town of Bernkastel-Kues is 4 kilometres (2.5 mi) northeast, the county town of Wittlich is about 15 kilometres (9 mi) northwest, and the nearest city is Trier, 31 kilometres (19 mi) southwest (all distances in a straight line).

== History ==
The first written reference to the castle was in the year 1156 (possibly a few years earlier). Frederick I (Barbarossa) confirmed the holding by Albert, the Bishop of Verdun, of the castle together with the surrounding land.

Since the 12th century, the Counts of Veldenz have been the feudal lords of the land and the castle, which became centre of the County of Veldenz. In 1286 Rudolf von Habsburg granted Veldenz city and market charters.

In 1444 the castle and associated lands passed to the Counts Palatine of Zweibrücken, after failure of the Veldenz male line. They and their successors remained in possession of the castle and county until the year 1694, even though during the intervening Thirty Years War followed approximately 150 years later by the Palatinian Succession War the castle was occupied by Swedish, Spanish and French troops.

In 1681, the castle was destroyed. In the following years, the owner moved and often used the ruin as a quarry. Over time it belonged to the Electorate of the Palatinate and Bavaria. Since 1807, it is in private hands and is now owned by the Haufs-Brusberg family.

== Today ==
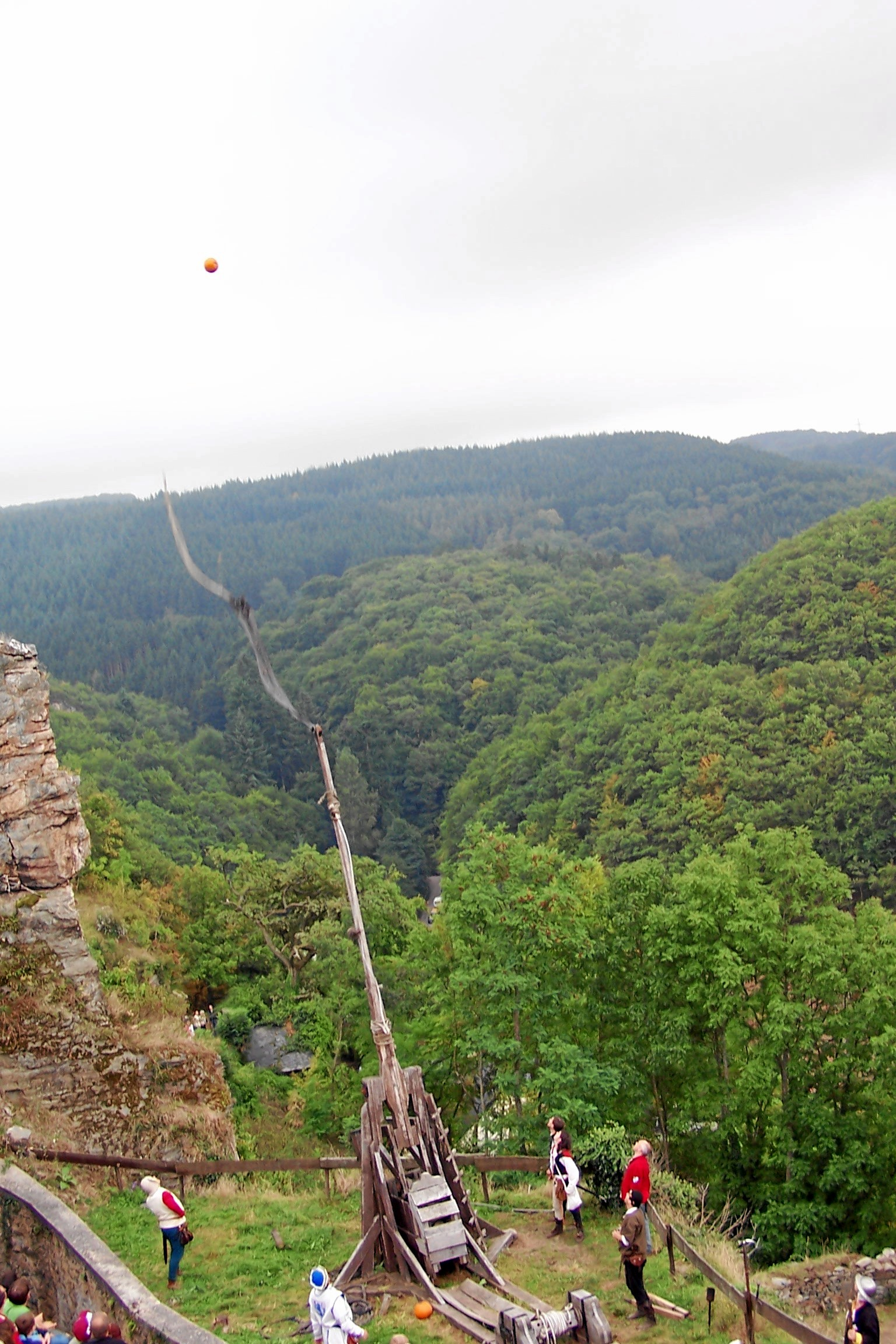
A trebuchet (replica) hurls a pumpkin

In the 15th century the site was the largest castle in the Central Moselle. This fact would appear to explain the German term Schloss in its name. At the same time it distinguishes the castle of Nohfelden known in German as "Burg Veldenz".

The extensive ruins of the spur castle were underpinned and partly rebuilt in the 19th century. They are on a high hill spur that drops away steeply on three sides. They are almost 100 metres (330 ft) long and 30 metres (98 ft) wide.

On the main defensive side in the north, and similarly on the southern flank, is a strategic bastion. The bergfried in the east was not rebuilt, in contrast to the palas with its distinctive stepped gable, which is now used as a restaurant.

== Literature ==
- Alexander Thon/Stefan Ulrich, "Von den Schauern der Vorwelt umweht...". Burgen und Schlösser an der Mosel, Regensburg: Schnell & Steiner 2007, S. 148-153. ISBN 978-3-7954-1926-4
