= Kommen =

- Municipality
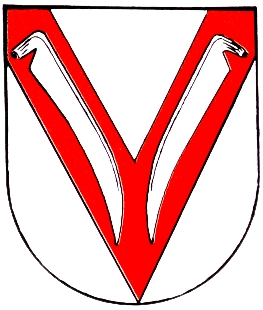
- Coat of arms

- Location of Kommen within Bernkastel-Wittlich district
- Interactive map of Kommen
- Location within Germany Location within Rhineland-Palatinate
- Coordinates: 49°52′47″N 7°7′43″E
- Country: Germany
- State: Rhineland-Palatinate
- District: Bernkastel-Wittlich
- Municipal assoc.: Bernkastel-Kues

Government
  - Mayor (2019–24): Thomas Herrmann

Area
  - Total: 2.82 km^{2} (1.09 sq mi)
- Elevation: 460 m (1,510 ft)

Population (2025-12-31)
  - Total: 290
  - Density: 100/km^{2} (270/sq mi)
- Time zone: UTC+01:00 (CET)
  - Summer (DST): UTC+02:00 (CEST)
- Postal codes: 54472
- Dialling codes: 06536
- Vehicle registration: WIL
- Website: www.kommen.de

Kommen (German pronunciation: [ˈkɔmən]) is an Ortsgemeinde – a municipality belonging to a Verbandsgemeinde, a kind of collective municipality – in the Bernkastel-Wittlich district in Rhineland-Palatinate, Germany.

== Geography ==
=== Location ===
The municipality lies in the northern Hunsrück. The nearest middle centre is Bernkastel-Kues. Kommen belongs to the Verbandsgemeinde of Bernkastel-Kues, whose seat is in the like-named town.

=== Climate ===
Kommen lies within the temperate zone.

== History ==
In 922, Kommen had its first documentary mention as Cuminu. Until 1802 it formed a unified municipality with Longkamp.

== Politics ==
=== Municipal council ===
The municipal council is made up of 6 council members, who were elected by majority vote at the municipal election held on 7 June 2009, and the honorary mayor as chairman.

=== Coat of arms ===
The municipality's arms might be described thus: Argent a chevron reversed gules, the ends in chief and the point at the base, surmounted on each side by a scythe blade of the field, the points to base.

The reversed (that is, upside down) chevron forms a V, which is meant to stand for the village's patron saint, Valentine, and the scythe blades refer to the agriculture that is the villagers’ main livelihood even today.

The arms have been borne since 8 November 1962.

== Culture and sightseeing ==
The village chapel goes back to 1730.

== Economy and infrastructure ==
Public transport in Kommen is integrated into the Verkehrsverbund Region Trier (VRT), whose fares therefore apply. Since September 2008, Kommen has had at its disposal a “youth room”, which was built almost exclusively by the village youth and with help from a few professionals from the municipality.
