= Leichtbau Maier =

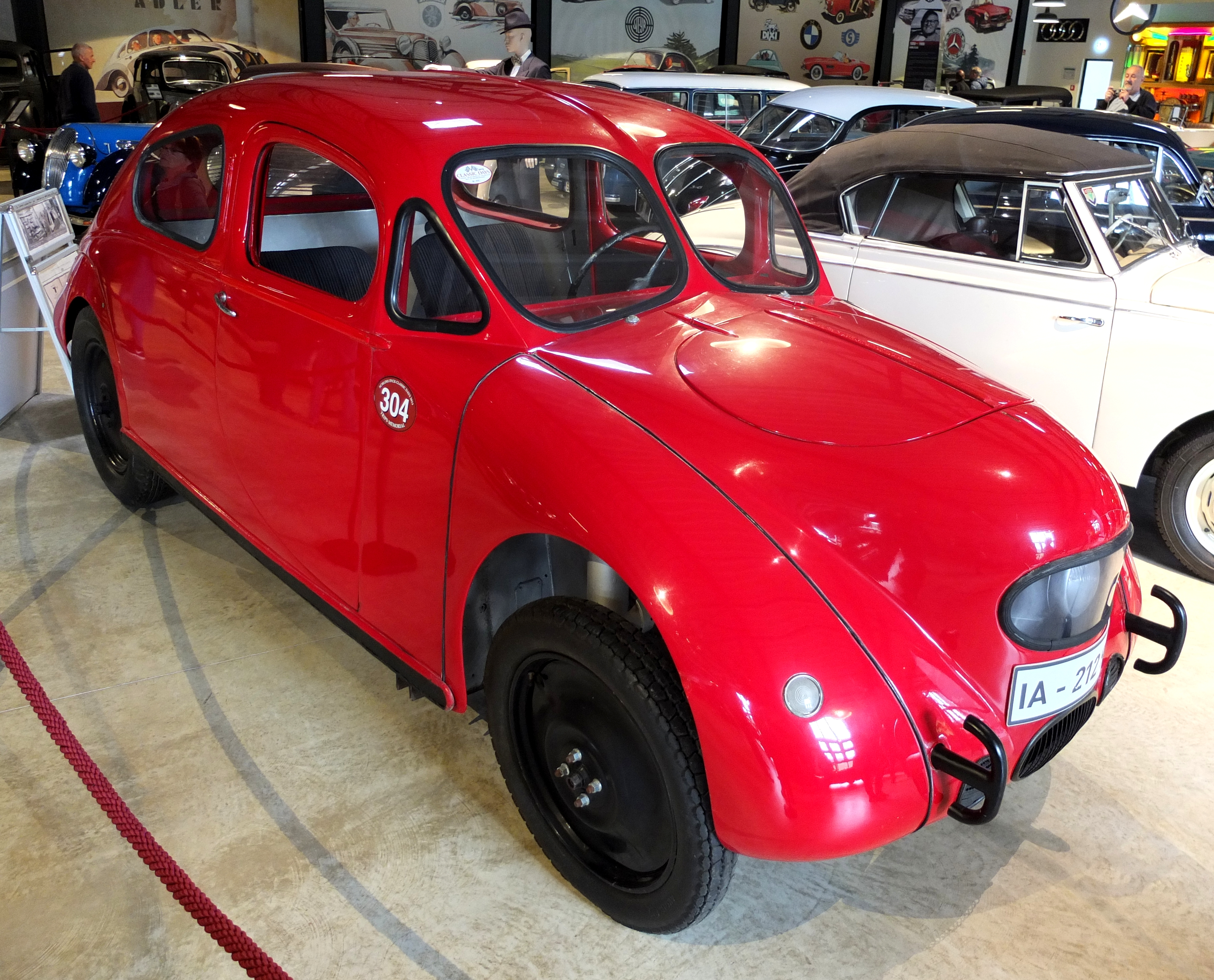
„Leichtbau Maier“ (1934-1935), model 0501/35, in Zylinderhaus Bernkastel-Kues

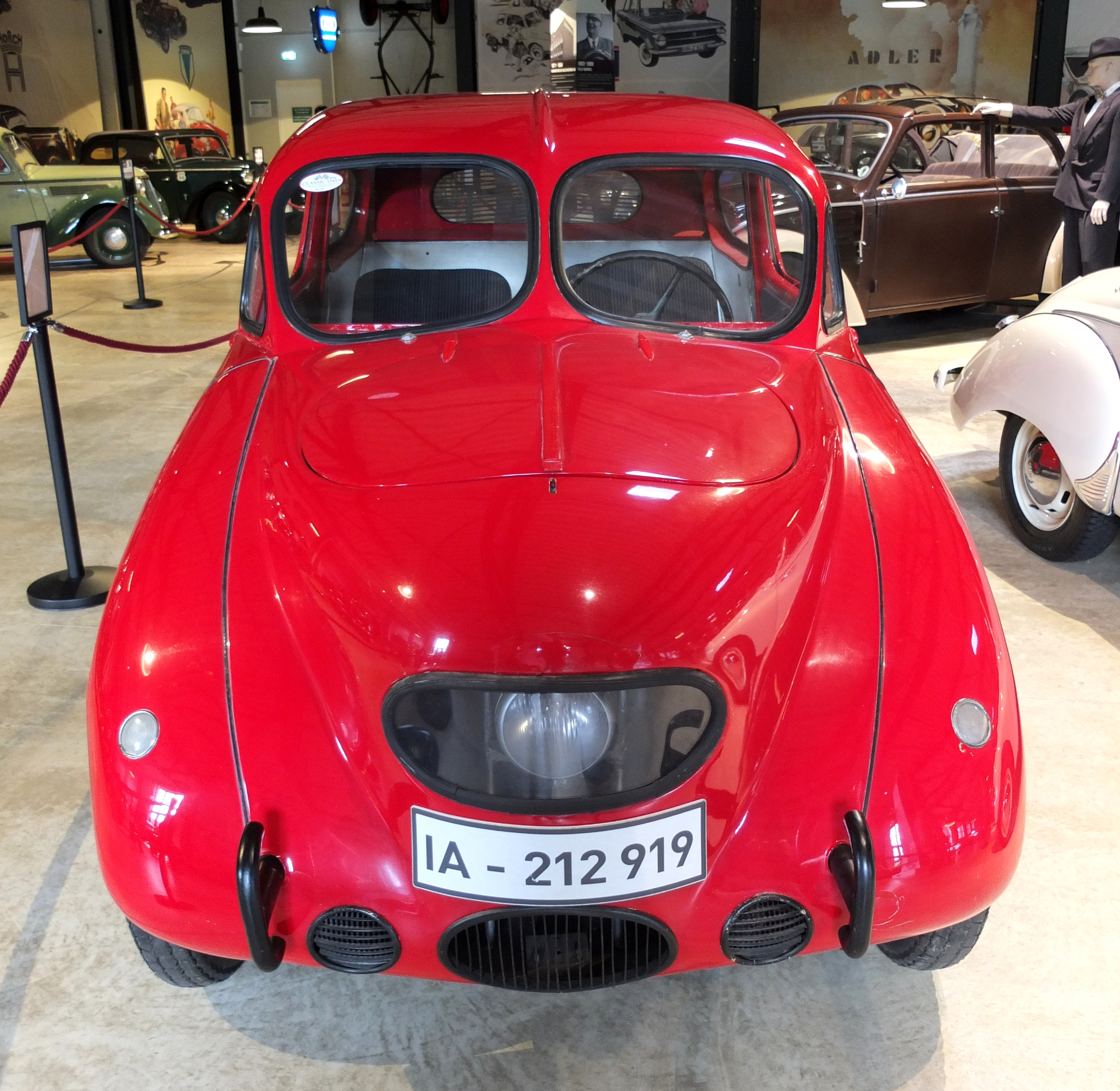
Front view

Leichtbau Maier is a mostly unknown German car brand from the beginning of the twentieth century. The engineer Friedrich Eugen Maier from Berlin drafted and built in the 1930s at least one car prototype and succeeded in bringing this vehicle on the road.

== Technical description of a found prototype ==
The found compact car had a 20 HP DKW-engine. It was later replaced by the engine of a VW Käfer. The engineer installed some details that were revolutionary at that time: a driver's seat that can be adjusted in height (patented in July 1938), headlights that follow the steering, a chassis that was adjustable in height and a self-supporting closed car body (patented in July 1932.). In total, Maier applied for 12 car related patents in Germany and others in the United States and Great Britain. The following can be found on the type board: "Fabrikat Leichtbau Maier. Wagen-Nummer LM 050 1/35; Motor-Nummer 386418; 20 PS; Bohrung 76; Hub 76; Gewicht 684 kg; Gesamtgewicht 1034 kg" (Brand: Leichtbau Maier. Vehicle number LM 050 1/35; Engine number 386418; 20 HP; Hole 76; Stroke 76; weight 684 kg; total weight 1034 kg)

== History ==
The published vehicle went through some collectors and a paint shop 2007 in the possession of Jörg Jansen. He began to restore the car and found the mentioned type board. Since his profession as expert for cars, he began to search what the name Leichtbau Maier meant. Thanks to the support of the Ptotoype-Museum in Hamburg, Hanspeter Bröhl and Herman van Oldeneel (who found out what the precise name was of the spot where Maier lived and worked), the history became a little bit more clear.

Friedrich Eugen Maier ran in the beginning of the 1930s until 1944 a repair shop on the Sömmeringstraße 31/32 in Berlin-Charlottenburg on the ground that belonged to the Magistrat von Berlin. On this terrain, there was a printing office (Bernand & Graefe) until 1933. In the neighbourhood, a repair shop, a paint shop and the Kraftfahrzeugwerkstätte Sömmeringstraße GmbH. It is possible that they influenced Maier's choice where he opened his company.

There is no official address registered for an engineer Friedrich Maier, neither for a Eugen Maier in the address books of Berlin in 1930 - 1935. Nevertheless, he applied in 1935 for a patent concerning a driver's seat that can be adjusted completely in height, length and angle and for another patent about a wheels suspension that was the first of its kind. Based on a facsimile regarding a patent of Maier, it can be concluded that he lived in Berlin-Karlshorst.

In 1936, an official entry can be found: „Maier, Friedrich, E.“, Leichtbau, Sömmeringstraße 30 (followed by his phone number). A search after the street and number doesn't result in anything. It seems that the site was split, got new numbers and were then used by Maier. In the same year, Maier had to repair German Wehrmachts-vehicle. Also, he applied for his second patent about the car body for automobile

In 1937, Maier had an entry on the Sömmeringstraße 30 ("Maier, Fr., Dipl. Ing.") without his company. According to the official address books, Maier was present on the Sömmeringstraße 30 until 1943, but the brand "Leichtbau Maier" can't be found anymore. Maier bought the site 1943 and changed it into a sports field. Except the mentioned prototype, there are now other known cars that were produced here.

== Literatur ==
- Christine Dankbar: Spurensuche nach Friedrich Eugen Maier. In: Berliner Zeitung, 2. Januar 2014.
  printed version from January 3, 2014: Wer kennt Friedrich Eugen Maier? S. 18.
- Christine Dankbar: Der einsame Erfinder, in: Berliner Zeitung from September 4, 2014, p. 18.
