= Moselle Hills =

Moselle Hills Moselberge
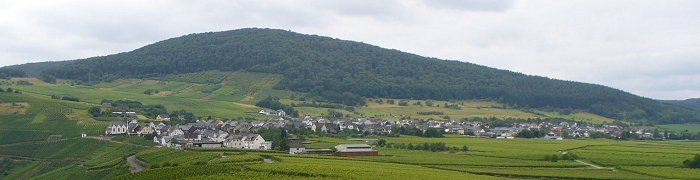
- The Monzeler Hüttenkopf, the second highest top in the Moselle Hills

Highest point
- Peak: Schimmelsberg aufm Hüttenberg
- Elevation: 434.1 m above NHN

Geography
- Location within Rhineland-Palatinate
- State(s): between Reil and Schweich; counties of Bernkastel-Wittlich and Trier-Saarburg, Rhineland-Palatinate (Germany)
- Range coordinates: 49°54′03″N 6°55′18″E
- Parent range: Moselle valley

The Moselle Hills (German: Moselberge) form a ridge, up to 434.1 m above sea level (NHN), on the left bank of the river Moselle between Reil and Schweich in the Rhineland-Palatinate counties of Bernkastel-Wittlich and Trier-Saarburg. There are vineyards on the southern slopes of the wooded hills. They lie on the southern edge of the Eifel region.

== Geography ==
=== Location ===
The Moselle Hills lie between the village Reil in the northeast and the town of Schweich in the southwest and run past the wine village of Piesport northwest along the Moselle, the aforementioned settlements all lying on the river itself.

=== Natural regional grouping ===
From a natural regional perspective, the Moselle Hills belong to the major unit group, the Moselle Valley (Moseltal, No. 25) and in the major unit of Middle Moselle Valley (Mittleres Moseltal, No. 250). The natural regional sub-unit of the Moselle Hills (Moselberge, 250.2) are separated from the Moselle Eifel major unit (270) (also part of the Eifel) to the northwest by the major unit of the Wittlich Basin (Wittlicher Senke, 251).

=== Hills ===
The hills and high points of the Moselle Hills – sorted by their height in metres (m) above sea level (NHN) include the:

- Schimmelsberg aufm Hüttenberg (434.1 m), around 1.7 km north of Piesport in the parish of Minheim
- Monzeler Hüttenkopf (423.4 m, west of Monzel)
- Mehringer Berg (418.7 m, northwest of Mehring)
- Hansenberg (401.8 m), east of Rivenich
- Thomasberg (382.9 m), south of Klausen
- Rothenberg (365.3 m), east of Wengerohr
- Stöppelberg (364 m), northeast of Klausen
- Rudemberg (278 m), west of Klüsserath
- (Noviander) Hüttenkopf (273.3 m), west of Noviand
- Geisberg (262 m), south of Mülheim on Moselle

=== Rivers ===
The southern part of the Moselle Hills is bisected in a north-south direction by a stretch of the Salm, and the Lieser cuts through its northern part from northwest to southeast. Both rivers are tributaries of the Moselle.
