= Geisberg (Middle Moselle) =

Mountain in Germany

- Bitschberg, Pitsch Berg, Bitsch, Benhaar, Geischberg
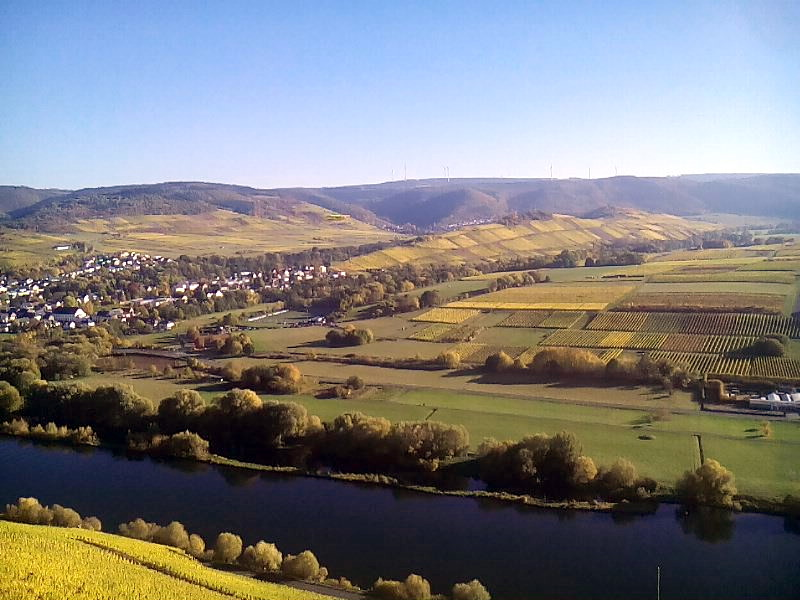
- The Geisberg (literally: Goats Hill) seen from the north-west, Moselle in between, Mühlheim village to the left

Highest point
- Elevation: 262 m (860 ft)
- Listing: Natural region Moselle Valley, Middle Moselle, Osann-Veldenz former circulated mountains
- Coordinates: 49°53′21″N 7°0′39″E

Geography
- Parent range: Moselle Hills, Rhenish Massif

Geology
- Rock age: Lower Devonian
- Rock type: Clay Slate

The Geisberg (German pronunciation: [ˈɡaɪsbɛʁk]) is a 262 m high mountain at Mülheim on Moselle, in Germany. It is a remnant of a dry fallen meander of the river Moselle.

== Geography ==
The Geisberg is a narrow, elongated mountain ridge in a valley widening of the Middle Moselle. Surrounded by a wide circulating valley, it stands isolated from the other Moselle Hills and the adjacent Haardtwald Hills of the Hunsrück. Starting from Mülheim on Moselle, about half a kilometer from the banks of the Moselle, it extends over 3 km to the south, past Veldenz village up to the village of Burgen. Its flanks, which are well developed with numerous paved paths, are almost entirely covered with vineyards. It has two wooded summits, of which the more southerly near Veldenz is 262 m above sea level and the other in its central area 226 m. The peaks are lying 80 to 100 m above the level of the surrounding valley.

The Geisberg is located in the region of the Middle Moselle. It belongs to the right-hand side, the Hunsrück facing Moselle Hills, which are part of the Rhenish Massif on the left bank of the river Rhine. The hills of this region were not raised by tectonic uplift of individual masses from a low-lying plain, but rather through downcutting which cut valleys and ravines into a coherent mountain mass. The predominant rocks are Clay Slate and Greywacke from the Lower Devonian which is not quite water resistant.

== Genesis ==
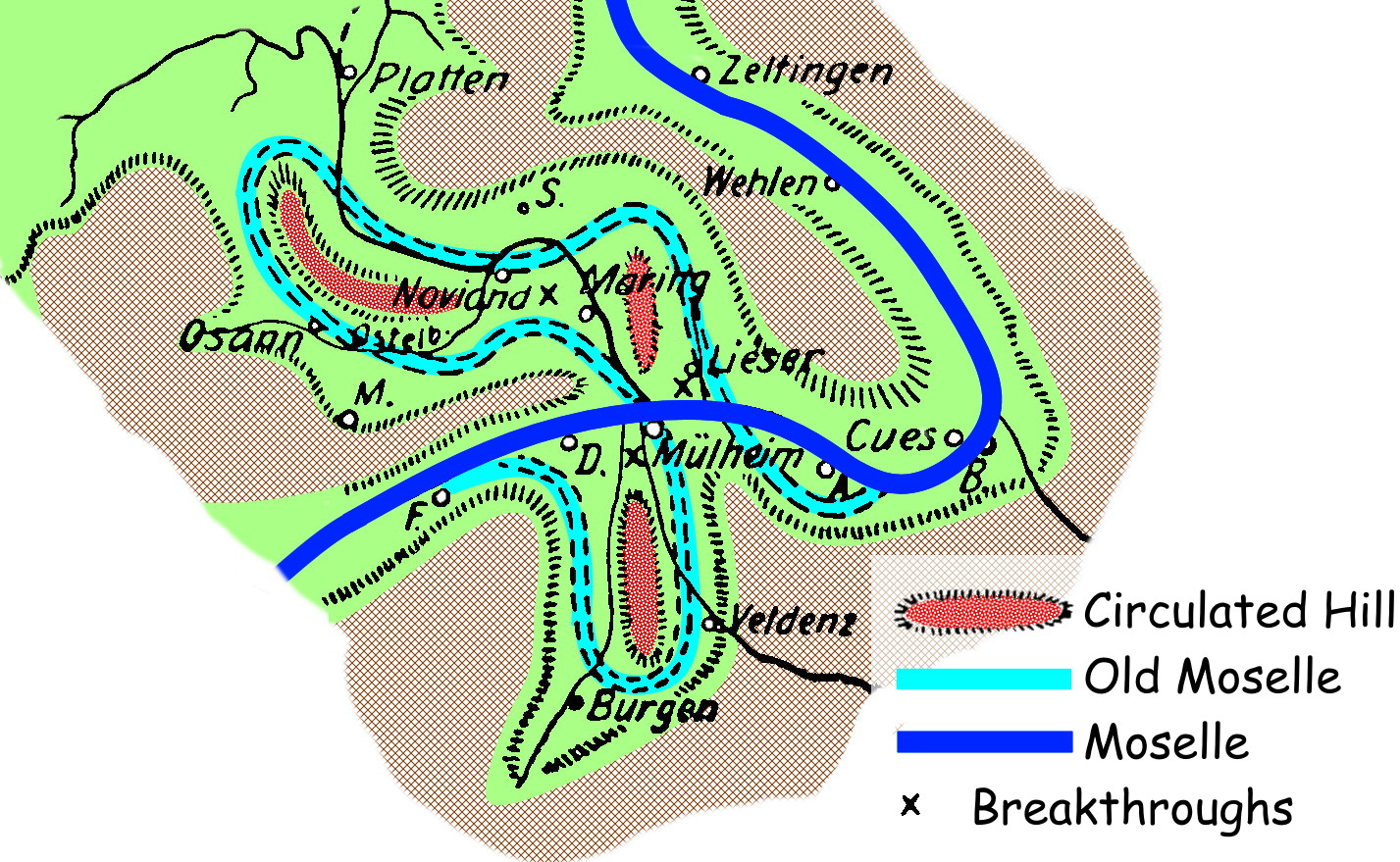
The Old Moselle: Course and breakthroughs between the former circulated mountains of Osann-Veldenz.

From the Quaternary onwards, the Moselle formed Meander in an originally flat plain with a balanced, flat undulating relief and cut progressively into today's narrow valley. At the beginning of the Upper Middle Terrace period, the Geisberg was a peninsula in a Moselle meander. On the west side of the mountain, the Moselle turned south, deviating from today's course, and turned in a loop near Burgen village back north and further along the east side. The Moselle continued flowing across the today's course past the Brauneberg mountain, and further in a north-westerly direction through the valley of Osann-Monzel into the Wittlich Depression. There it turned back south and reached in Lieser the current course of the river again, at 2 to 3 km from the point where these bends began. At the time of the Lower Terrace, a first breakthrough of the Moselle took place on what was then an impact slope near today's Mülheim. Further breakthroughs followed at the villages of Noviand and Maring. The Geisberg became the first and oldest circulating mountain in this area, before the Noviander Hüttenkopf and the Maring Mountain. Today the rivulets Frohnbach and Veldenzer Bach are flowing through the former Moselle valley at the Geisberg. Both come from the Hunsrück and had to relocate their estuaries after the Moselle had taken another course.
