= Monzeler Hüttenkopf =

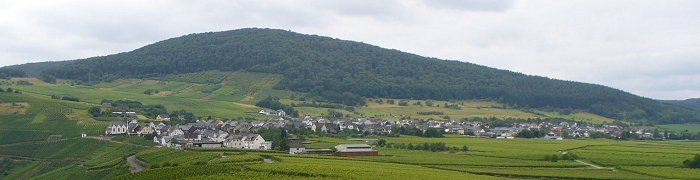
- The Monzeler Hüttenkopf seen from nearby Brauneberg.

Highest point
- Elevation: 423.4 m above sea level (NN) (1,389 ft)
- Coordinates: 49°54′28″N 6°56′24″E

Geography
- Location within Rhineland-Palatinate
- Location: Osann-Monzel, Rhineland-Palatinate, Germany
- Parent range: Moselle Hills

The Monzeler Hüttenkopf, also just Hüttenkopf, at 423.4 m above sea level (NN), is the second highest point of the Moselle Hills. It lies within the municipality of Osann-Monzel in the German county of Bernkastel-Wittlich.
