= Longkamp =

- Municipality
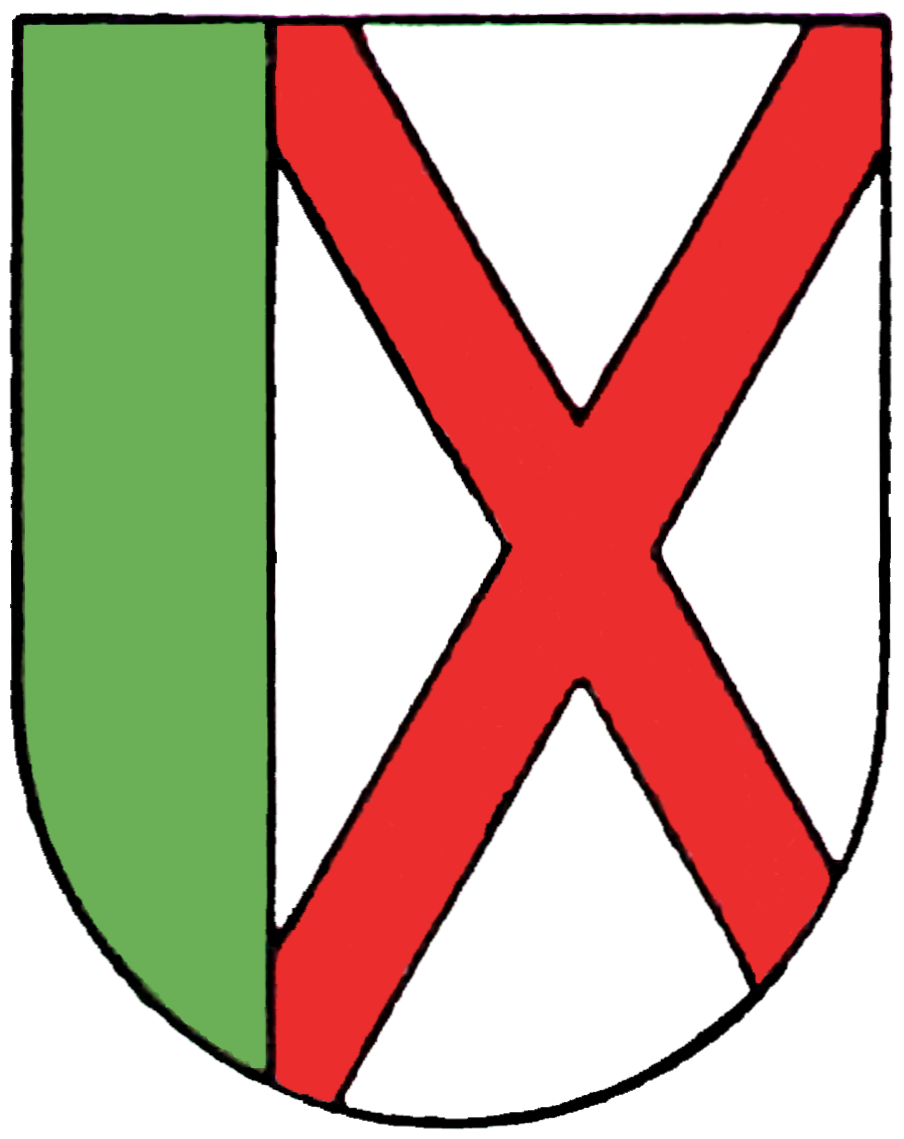
- Coat of arms

- Location of Longkamp within Bernkastel-Wittlich district
- Interactive map of Longkamp
- Location within Germany Location within Rhineland-Palatinate
- Coordinates: 49°53′22″N 7°07′01″E
- Country: Germany
- State: Rhineland-Palatinate
- District: Bernkastel-Wittlich
- Municipal assoc.: Bernkastel-Kues

Government
  - Mayor (2019–24): Horst Gorges

Area
  - Total: 11.50 km^{2} (4.44 sq mi)
- Elevation: 410 m (1,350 ft)

Population (2025-12-31)
  - Total: 1,108
  - Density: 96.35/km^{2} (249.5/sq mi)
- Time zone: UTC+01:00 (CET)
  - Summer (DST): UTC+02:00 (CEST)
- Postal codes: 54472
- Dialling codes: 06531
- Vehicle registration: WIL
- Website: www.longkamp.de

Longkamp is an Ortsgemeinde – a municipality belonging to a Verbandsgemeinde, a kind of collective municipality – in the Bernkastel-Wittlich district in Rhineland-Palatinate, Germany.

== Geography ==
Longkamp is surrounded with meadows and forests. It lies at the edge of the Hunsrück south of the Moselle and is a state-recognised tourism community. It belongs to the Verbandsgemeinde of Bernkastel-Kues, whose seat is in the like-named town.

== History ==
In 1030, Longkamp had its first documentary mention. The name is of Gallo-Romance origin and derives from the Latin longus campus, which means “long field”. Until 1802, Longkamp was united with Kommen into one municipality.

== Politics ==
=== Municipal council ===
The council is made up of 16 council members, who were elected by proportional representation at the municipal election held on 7 June 2009, and the honorary mayor as chairman.

The municipal election held on 7 June 2009 yielded the following results:

Year	SPD	CDU	Kaiser	Total
2009	2	9	5	16 seats
2004	2	10	4	16 seats

=== Mayors ===
Since 2019, Horst Gorges has been Mayor of Longkamp. His predecessor was Franz-Josef Klingels, in office between 2007 and 2019. He succeeded Hans Johann Herrmann (CDU).

== Economy and infrastructure ==
=== Economy ===
Although there were still 150 farming businesses in the 1950s, agriculture today only plays a very small rôle in the local economy.

=== Education ===
In Longkamp are one kindergarten and one primary school.

=== Transport ===
Frankfurt-Hahn Airport lies 21 km away.
