= Veldenz =

- Municipality
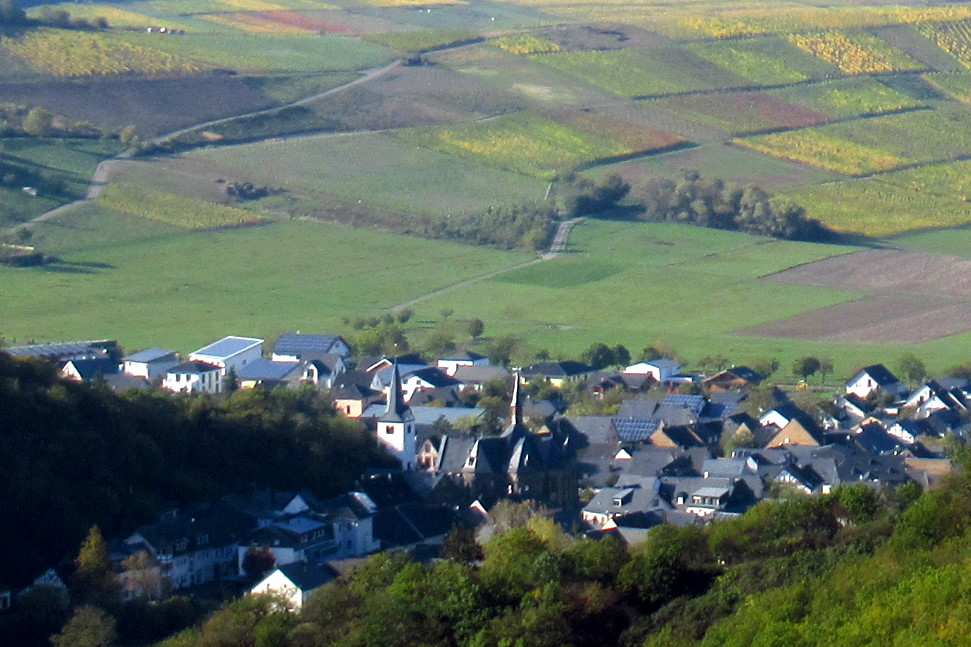
- The village of Veldenz as seen from Veldenz Castle

- Coat of arms

- Location of Veldenz within Bernkastel-Wittlich district
- Interactive map of Veldenz
- Location within Germany Location within Rhineland-Palatinate
- Coordinates: 49°53′26″N 7°1′33″E
- Country: Germany
- State: Rhineland-Palatinate
- District: Bernkastel-Wittlich
- Municipal assoc.: Bernkastel-Kues
- Subdivisions: 2

Government
  - Mayor (2019–24): Norbert Sproß

Area
  - Total: 14.41 km^{2} (5.56 sq mi)
- Elevation: 170 m (560 ft)

Population (2025-12-31)
  - Total: 931
  - Density: 64.6/km^{2} (167/sq mi)
- Time zone: UTC+01:00 (CET)
  - Summer (DST): UTC+02:00 (CEST)
- Postal codes: 54472
- Dialling codes: 06534
- Vehicle registration: WIL
- Website: www.veldenz.de

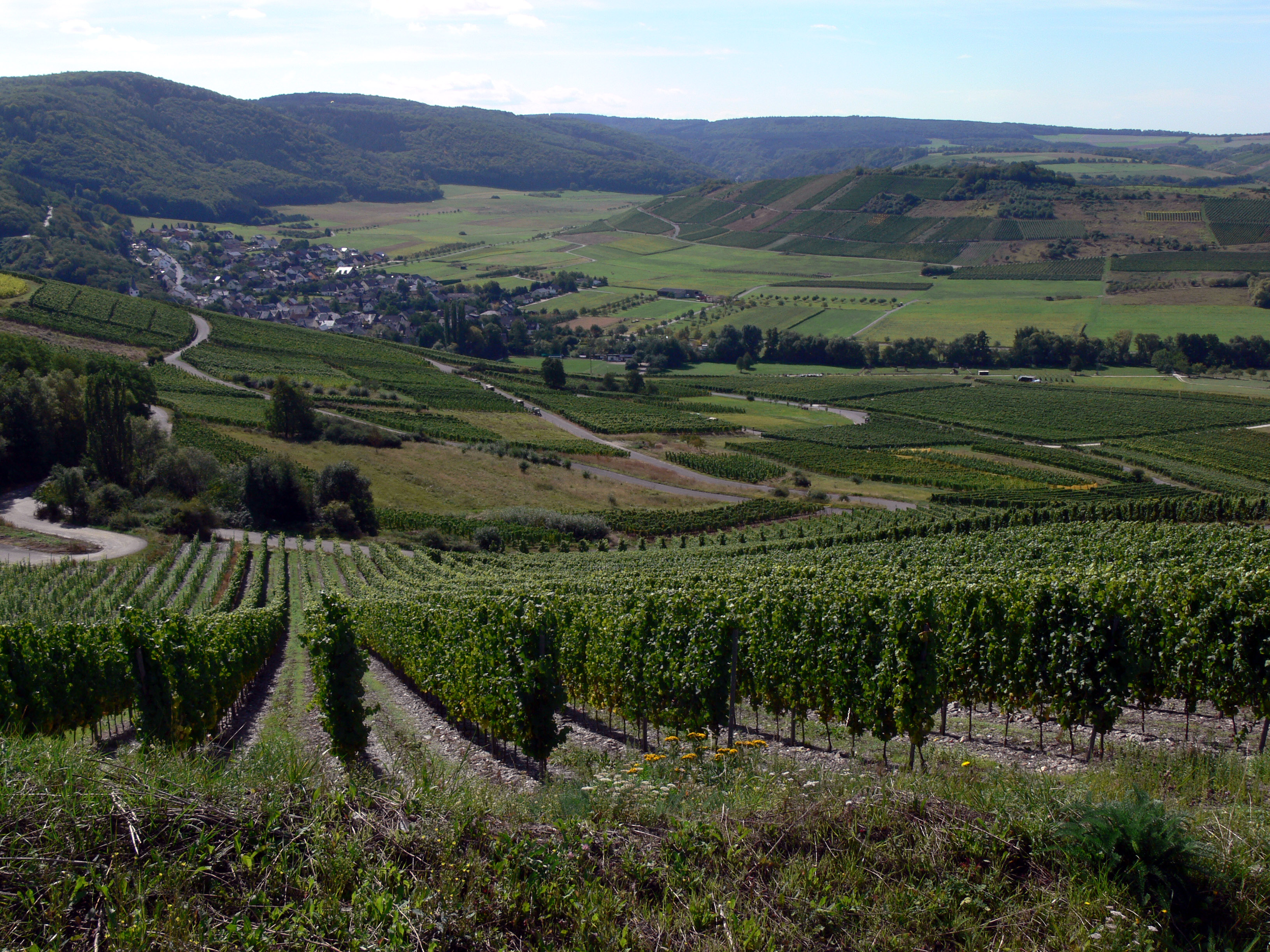
Veldenz valley is a dry fallen meander of the river Moselle. The village to the left and Geisberg mountain to the right.

Veldenz is an Ortsgemeinde – a municipality belonging to a Verbandsgemeinde, a kind of collective municipality – in the Bernkastel-Wittlich district in Rhineland-Palatinate, Germany. It is the former main seat of the County of Veldenz, once a prominent principality to which belonged 120 villages and towns now in Rhineland-Palatinate and northern Alsace and Lorraine.

== Geography ==
=== Location ===
The municipality lies in the Middle Moselle region of valley country marked by even slopes and former oxbows of the Moselle. Veldenz is found on the Moselle's right bank, but does not lie right at the water's edge, but rather some two kilometres back from the river, under the outermost forests of the Hunsrück. Roughly 850 ha of the 1 441 ha municipal area is wooded. About 130 ha is given over to winegrowing.

Veldenz belongs to the Verbandsgemeinde of Bernkastel-Kues, whose seat is in the like-named town.

=== Nearby municipalities ===
Neighbouring municipalities are, among others, Burgen and Mülheim. The nearest middle centres are Bernkastel-Kues, some 10 km away, and Wittlich, some 17 km away. Trier lies some 45 km away.

=== Constituent communities ===
Veldenz's Ortsteile are Veldenz and Thalveldenz.

=== Climate ===
Veldenz lies within the temperate zone; compared to other regions in Germany, a very warm and sunny climate prevails here. In neighbouring Brauneberg on 11 August 1998, a record temperature of 41.2 °C in the shade, the highest ever air temperature recorded in the Federal Republic, was confirmed. Because of its location alee of the Eifel, precipitation from northwest weather systems is often kept away. Ongoing evaporation of water from the Moselle regularly leads to high humidity, which, especially in summer, makes at times for heavy and muggy weather, and which also brings many storms along with it.

== History ==
As early as 500 BC, the Treveri, a people of mixed Celtic and Germanic stock, from whom the Latin name for the city of Trier, Augusta Treverorum, is also derived, settled in Veldenz's fertile valley. After them, from about 50 BC to AD 500 came the Romans. Possibly about the year 1129, Gerlach I built a castle, today's Schloss Veldenz. In 1286, Rudolph of Habsburg granted Veldenz town and market rights. By 1444, the castle and its environs had passed to Stephen, Count Palatine of Simmern-Zweibrücken, or between 1543 and 1694 the Principality of Palatinate-Veldenz. In 1752, in Burgen near Veldenz, the widely known robber, Johann Peter Petri, also known as Schwarzer Peter (“Black Peter”), was born. From 1777 to 1797, Veldenz belonged to Bavaria. After French rule as part of Sarre department, it was annexed to Prussia in 1815. In 1835 the Veldenz Lion was adopted as the Bavarian Lion in that kingdom's coat of arms. Even today, many examples of comital building undertakings from the 18th century can be found, among them the town hall.

== Politics ==
=== Municipal council ===
The council is made up of 12 council members, who were elected at the municipal election held on 7 June 2009. The mayor is Norbert Sproß.

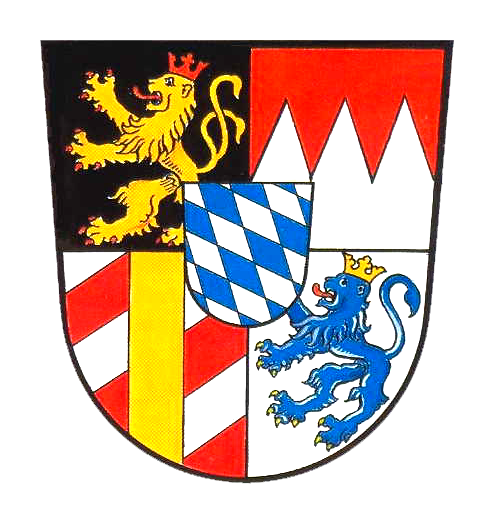
Bavarian coat of arms from 1835 with the Lion of Veldenz. It also depicts: the Palatine Lion, the Franconian Rake and the Margraviate of Burgau as well as the Bavarian lozenges in the inescutcheon. These arms held their place until the end of the monarchy.

The municipal election held on 7 June 2009 yielded the following results:

Year	Freie Wählergruppe Veldenz e.V.	Freie Wählergruppe Bauer	Total
2009	7	5	12 seats

=== Coat of arms ===
Coat of arms of Veldenz

The municipality's arms might be described thus: Bendy lozengy argent and azure, in dexter chief an inescutcheon of the first charged with a lion rampant of the second armed and langued gules.

The lion in the inescutcheon is the heraldic charge once borne by the Counts of Veldenz, and the “bendy lozengy” pattern seen on the field is the Wittelsbach dynasty's armorial bearing. In 1835, this lion was adopted by Ludwig I, King of Bavaria into that kingdom's state coat of arms, where it remained as a charge until the end of the First World War when the last Bavarian king, Ludwig III was forced to abdicate as a result of the November Revolution.

== Culture and sightseeing ==
=== Village culture ===
In 1993 and 1995, Veldenz won the silver medal of the Federal Republic in the contest Unser Dorf soll schöner werden (“Our village should become lovelier”); in 2006, the villagers managed to triumph once again in the district and regional contest. In the vineyard locations of Elisenberg, Kirchberg, Mühlberg, Grafschafter Sonnenberg and Carlsberg, there is winegrowing. There still exist today in the municipality about a dozen wineries; Riesling is the customary variety.

=== Sightseeing ===
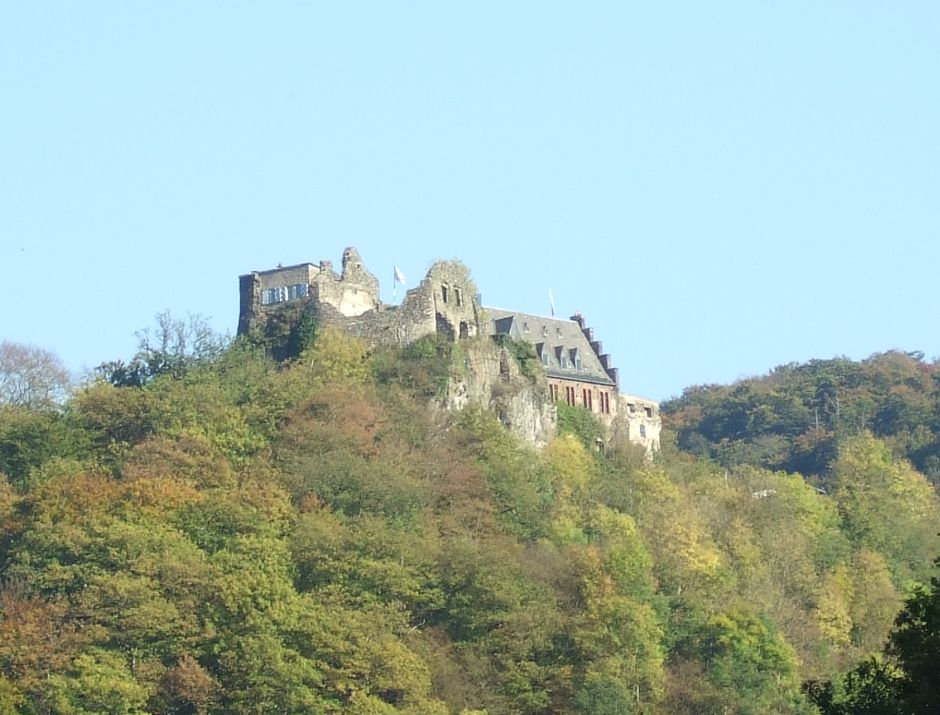
Schloss Veldenz 2007

Well known points of interest are the Villa Romana and Schloss Veldenz. There are other monumental buildings, such as the town hall, a signal tower from the 12th century, a mint, a Celtic wall and museums with various exhibits. Further points of interest are an historical market (Krammarkt), a farmer's garden (Bauerngarten), a wild garden, the Josefinenhöhe (heights), the Pionierfelsen (cliff), many ore and slate mines, the Roter Bohles leisure complex and many imposing cliff formations.

== Economy and infrastructure ==
Winegrowing and tourism play a prominent role. In Veldenz there are two village squares, three community houses, a village hall, several barbecue pits, educational paths dealing with both wine and the forest, a memorial, a graveyard, two churches and a sporting ground. Furthermore, Veldenz also has its own primary school, a kindergarten, a youth centre, a football field and four children's playgrounds. In the village is also a regional children's and youth home. Roughly 45 km of hiking trails lead around the village. Public transport in Veldenz is integrated into the Verkehrsverbund Region Trier (VRT), whose fares therefore apply.
