= Mageba =

German textile machinery manufacturer

Mageba is a producer of textile machinery, based in Bernkastel-Kues, Germany.

== History ==
Mageba was founded in 1957 by Hans Stang in Wuppertal/Barmen. Initially, Mageba focused on the manufacture of dyeing and finishing machines for narrow fabrics.

The growth of the company proceeded rapidly, including more varieties of machines for different aspects of narrow fabric production. Today Mageba has a large product programme ranging from weaving to preparation, finishing and making up. Mageba offers a wide range for narrow fabric production from a single supplier. In 2009 it was Europe’s largest manufacturer of textile machinery.

Mageba continues to develop new processes for traditional shuttle loom technology.
