= Graach Gate =

Coordinates: 49°54′58″N 7°04′34″E

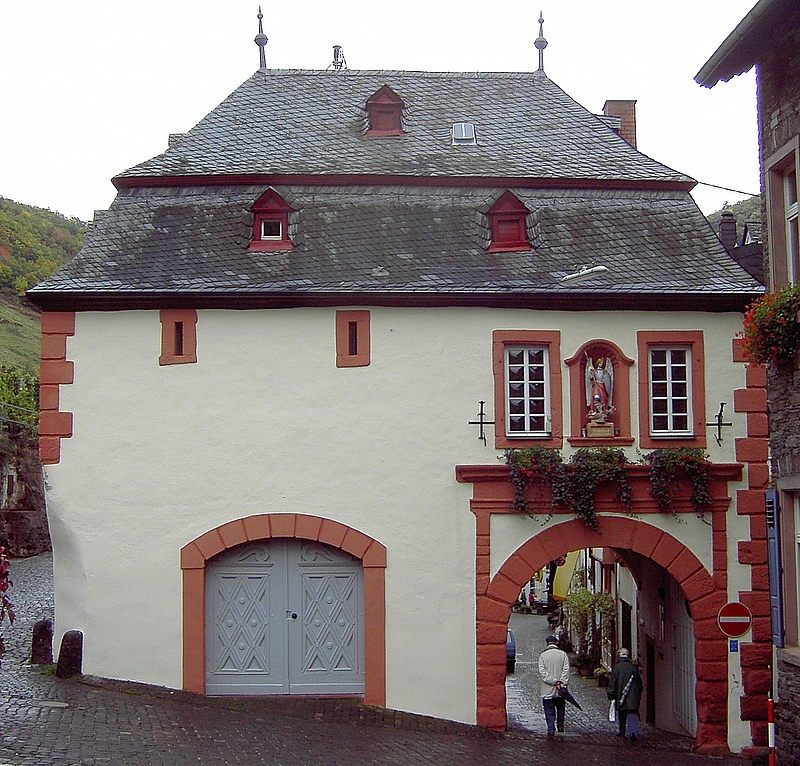
Graach Gate

The Graach Gate (German: Graacher Tor) is the last remaining town gate of the German town of Bernkastel-Kues. The name Graach refers to the neighbouring village of Graach connected by a narrow road to the gate. Currently the building is used as a museum of local history.

== History of the city gate ==
The Graach gate was built in 1300 as part of a town wall protecting the town of Bernkastel against foreign aggression. In 1689 it was partly destroyed by French troops under Louis XIV.

At the beginning of the 18th century, the gate was reconstructed and from 1714 was used as a prison. Later on it became a hostel for the homeless.

Since 2002 the gate has been a museum of local history.

== Architecture ==
The gate has an integrated passage built in a Baroque style with a mansard roof created in the 18th century. Before destruction in 1689 the Graach gate, shown in a drawing dated 1590, was equipped with a tower reaching three times the size of the current building.

After reconstruction in the 18th century the gate shows typical elements of a Renaissance-style building.

A figure of the Archangel St. Michael is placed centrally over the passage protecting the inhabitants of Bernkastel from aggression by intruders. The figure is a copy while the original is exhibited in the museum of the Catholic Diocese of Trier.
