= Graach an der Mosel =

- Municipality
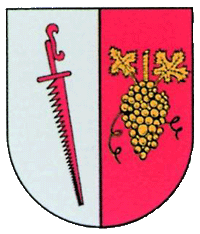
- Coat of arms

- Location of Graach an der Mosel within Bernkastel-Wittlich district
- Interactive map of Graach an der Mosel
- Location within Germany Location within Rhineland-Palatinate
- Coordinates: 49°56′6″N 7°3′45″E
- Country: Germany
- State: Rhineland-Palatinate
- District: Bernkastel-Wittlich
- Municipal assoc.: Bernkastel-Kues
- Subdivisions: 2

Government
  - Mayor (2019–24): Gerhard Zimmer

Area
  - Total: 8.62 km^{2} (3.33 sq mi)
- Elevation: 105 m (344 ft)

Population (2025-12-31)
  - Total: 626
  - Density: 72.6/km^{2} (188/sq mi)
- Time zone: UTC+01:00 (CET)
  - Summer (DST): UTC+02:00 (CEST)
- Postal codes: 54470
- Dialling codes: 06531
- Vehicle registration: WIL
- Website: www.graach.de

Graach an der Mosel (German pronunciation: [ˈɡʁaːx ʔan deːɐ̯ ˈmoːzl̩], lit. 'Graach on the Moselle') is an Ortsgemeinde – a municipality belonging to a Verbandsgemeinde, a kind of collective municipality – in the Bernkastel-Wittlich district in Rhineland-Palatinate, Germany.

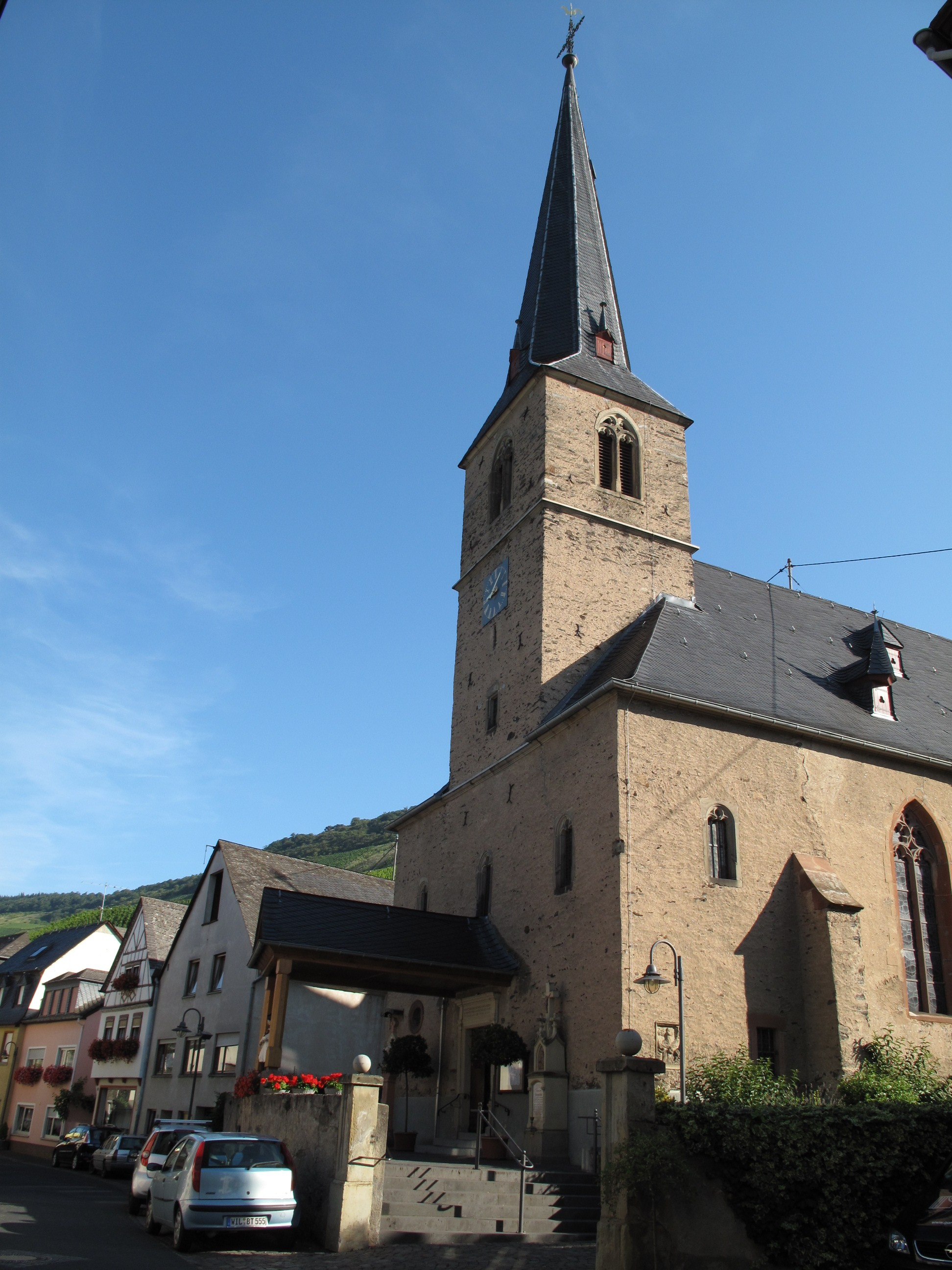
Graach, church

== Geography ==
=== Location ===
The municipality belongs to the Verbandsgemeinde of Bernkastel-Kues, whose seat is in the like-named town.

While Graach's main centre, also called Graach, lies in the Moselle valley, the outlying centre of Schäferei lies above the vineyards at an elevation of some 300 m above sea level.

=== Constituent communities ===
Graach's Ortsteile are Graach and Graach-Schäferei.

== History ==
In 975, Graach had its first documentary mention as Gracha.

== Politics ==
The municipal council is made up of 12 council members, who were elected by proportional representation at the municipal election held on 7 June 2009, and the honorary mayor as chairman.

The municipal election held on 7 June 2009 yielded the following results:

Year	CDU	VBB	Kemmer	Total
2009	8	2	2	12 seats

== Winegrowing ==
The municipality's appearance is characterized by wineries, mostly built of quarried stone, and wine estates.

Some 90% of Graach's vineyard area is in the form of steep-slope vineyards, and 95% of it is given over to raising Riesling grapes. One peculiarity is the cluster of ecclesiastical names borne by many of the local winemaking locations, such as Himmelreich (“Kingdom of Heaven”), Domprobst (“Cathedral Provost”) and Abtsberg (“Abbot’s Mountain”), which bear lasting witness to the ecclesiastical princes’ and monasteries’ ancient predilection for Graach's wine slopes. Over a road used mainly by winegrowers, Graach is linked to Bernkastel-Kues, where the gate through which the road passes into town is called the Graach Gate (Graacher Tor in German).
