= Osann-Monzel =

- Municipality
- Coat of arms

- Location of Osann-Monzel within Bernkastel-Wittlich district
- Interactive map of Osann-Monzel
- Location within Germany Location within Rhineland-Palatinate
- Coordinates: 49°55′18″N 6°57′19″E
- Country: Germany
- State: Rhineland-Palatinate
- District: Bernkastel-Wittlich
- Municipal assoc.: Wittlich-Land

Government
  - Mayor (2019–24): Armin Kohnz

Area
  - Total: 16.58 km^{2} (6.40 sq mi)
- Elevation: 190 m (620 ft)

Population (2025-12-31)
  - Total: 1,795
  - Density: 108.3/km^{2} (280.4/sq mi)
- Time zone: UTC+01:00 (CET)
  - Summer (DST): UTC+02:00 (CEST)
- Postal codes: 54518
- Dialling codes: 06535
- Vehicle registration: WIL, BKS
- Website: www.osann-monzel.de

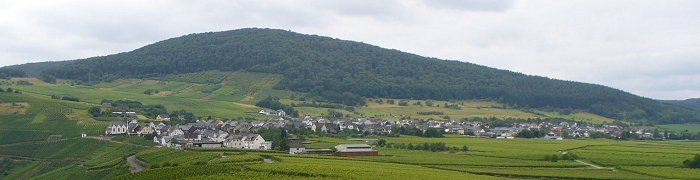
Monzel by the Hüttenkopf

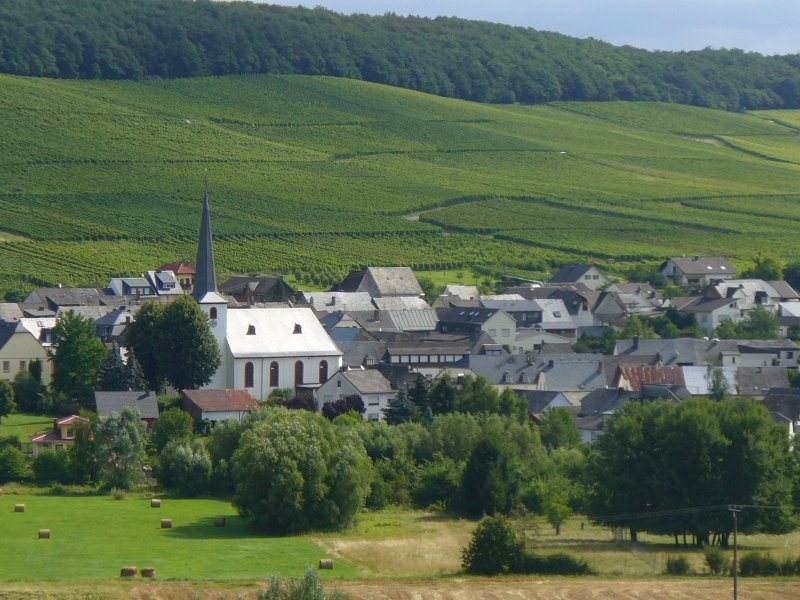
Osann at the Rosenberg

Osann-Monzel is an Ortsgemeinde – a municipality belonging to a Verbandsgemeinde, a kind of collective municipality – and a winegrowing centre in the Bernkastel-Wittlich district in Rhineland-Palatinate, Germany.

== Geography ==
=== Location ===
The municipality lies on the Middle Moselle on a slope set two kilometres back from the river, between the two hills of Hüttenkopf and Rosenberg in a side valley through which a bend in the Moselle flowed in the Tertiary. Osann-Monzel's elevation is some 180 m above sea level. Osann-Monzel belongs to the Verbandsgemeinde of Wittlich-Land, whose seat is in Wittlich, although that town is itself not part of the Verbandsgemeinde.

=== Constituent communities ===
Osann-Monzel's Ortsteile are, as the name suggests, Osann and Monzel. They were merged to form today's municipality in 1969.

== History ==
The Osann-Monzel area is believed to have first been settled in Roman times after Julius Caesar (100 BC – 44 BC) had absorbed the Eifel and the Moselle into the Roman Empire. Within Monzel's limits, rubble was found that was interpreted as having been a Roman villa rustica, that is, an agricultural homestead. After the end of Roman hegemony, the municipality belonged, beginning in 510, to Francia, and after that kingdom's division in the mid 9th century to Lotharingia. Lotharingia, for its part, switched allegiances between the East Frankish and West Frankish kingdoms. In the end, the municipal area belonged, beginning in 925, albeit with interruptions, to Germany's western border area.

No direct documentary mentionings from these times are known. Nevertheless, it is assumed that both Osann and Monzel were founded as early as the 7th or 8th century. At least it's certain that these places arose no later than 950. This follows from an inventory of holdings made at that time by Saint Martin's Abbey in Trier in which osanna and muncele villam are named. This first documentary mention has been dated to 1008.

Archbishop Balduin von Trier enfeoffed the Count of Saarbrücken-Nassau with Monzel and Osann in 1323; however, another important landholder in Monzel remained Himmerod Abbey. In 1412, the fiefholder at the time, Philipp von Nassau-Saarbrücken, further enfeoffed the Count of Daun and at Bruch with Osann and Monzel as a “subfief”, leading to Osann's and Monzel's becoming, through a dowry, part of the possessions held by the Counts of Manderscheid.

From 1794 on, both Osann and Monzel lay under French rule. In 1815 they were assigned to the Kingdom of Prussia at the Congress of Vienna. From 1946, they were part of the then newly founded state of Rhineland-Palatinate. In 1969, the two municipalities were dissolved, and out of them was formed the new municipality of Osann-Monzel on 7 June 1969.

== Politics ==
=== Municipal council ===
The council is made up of 16 council members, who were elected by proportional representation at the municipal election held in 2014, and the honorary mayor as chairman.

The municipal election held in 2014 yielded the following results:

| Year | WG Kohnz | Gem.f.OM e.V. | Total |
|---|---|---|---|
| 2014 | 11 | 5 | 16 seats |

=== Mayor ===
The Mayor is Armin Kohnz.

=== Coat of arms ===
The municipality's arms might be described thus: Per pale argent a cross gules and per fess Or a fess dancetty of the second and vert a bunch of grapes between two ears of wheat, the dexter in bend and the sinister in bend sinister and conjoined on one stem slipped in bend sinister, all of the third.

The cross on the dexter (armsbearer's right, viewer's left) side refers to Osann-Monzel's centuries-long allegiance to the Electorate of Trier. The zigzag stripe (“fess dancetty”) is the arms formerly borne by another of the municipality's old feudal lords, the Counts of Manderscheid-Blankenhein. Also on the sinister (armsbearer's left, viewer's right) side, the stylized bunch of grapes and the ears of wheat stand for the municipality's traditional winegrowing and agriculture respectively.

Osann-Monzel was granted the right to bear its own arms on 13 March 1972.

== Economy and infrastructure ==
=== Vineyards in Osann-Monzel ===
- Osanner Kirchlay
- Osanner Rosenberg
- Monzeler Kätzchen
- Monzeler Paulinslay

As everywhere in the Mosel-Saar-Ruwer wine region, it is mainly Riesling, Müller-Thurgau and Dornfelder that are raised.

=== Established businesses ===
- CTR Fahrzeugtechnik GmbH, 100 employees
