= Bernkastel-Kues =

- Town
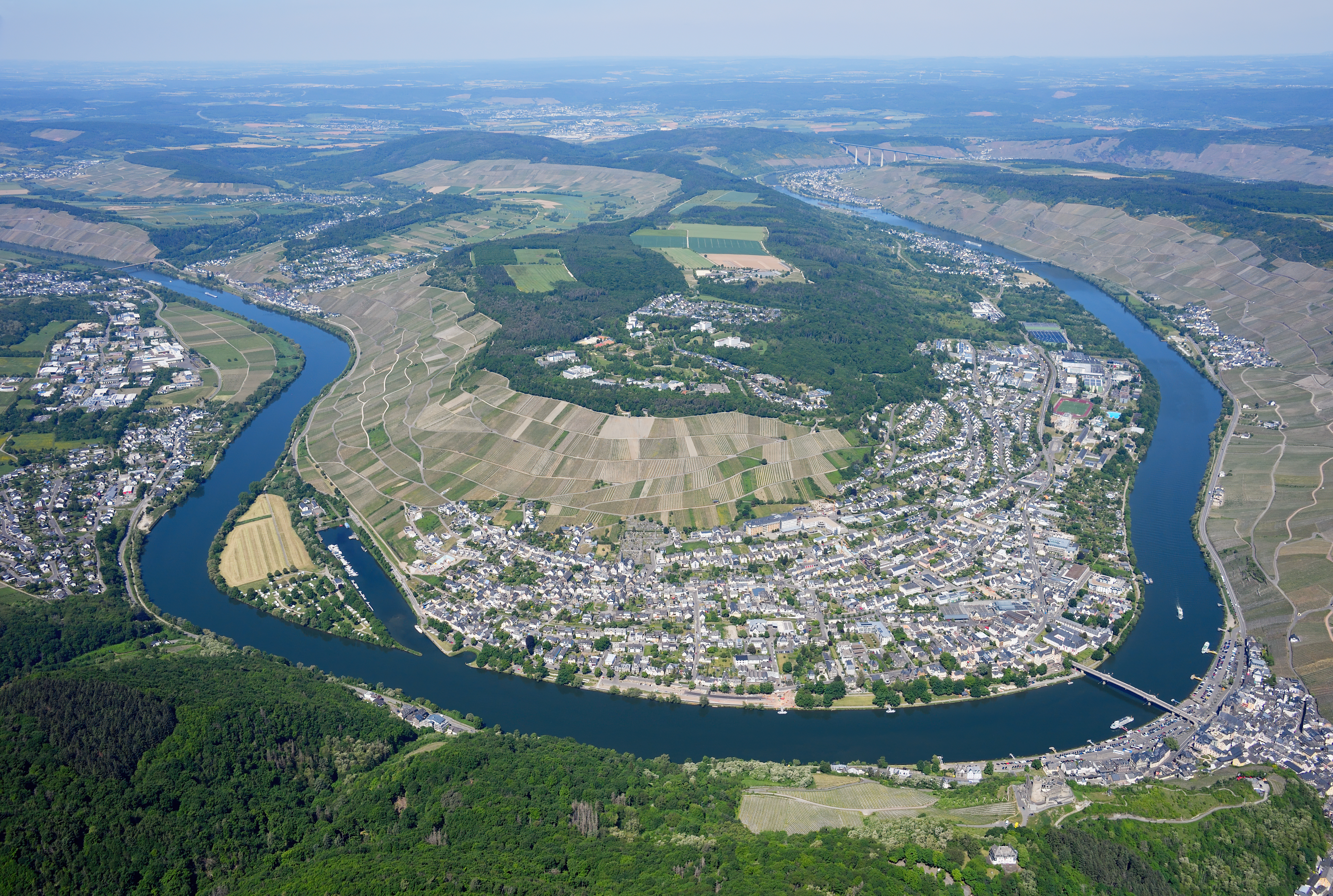
- Bernkastel-Kues

- Coat of arms

- Location of Bernkastel-Kues within Bernkastel-Wittlich district
- Interactive map of Bernkastel-Kues
- Location within Germany Location within Rhineland-Palatinate
- Coordinates: 49°54′58″N 07°04′10″E
- Country: Germany
- State: Rhineland-Palatinate
- District: Bernkastel-Wittlich
- Municipal assoc.: Bernkastel-Kues

Government
  - Mayor (2019–24): Wolfgang Port (CDU)

Area
  - Total: 23.71 km^{2} (9.15 sq mi)
- Elevation: 110 m (360 ft)

Population (2025-12-31)
  - Total: 6,682
  - Density: 281.8/km^{2} (729.9/sq mi)
- Time zone: UTC+01:00 (CET)
  - Summer (DST): UTC+02:00 (CEST)
- Postal codes: 54470
- Dialling codes: 06531
- Vehicle registration: WIL, BKS
- Website: www.bernkastel.de

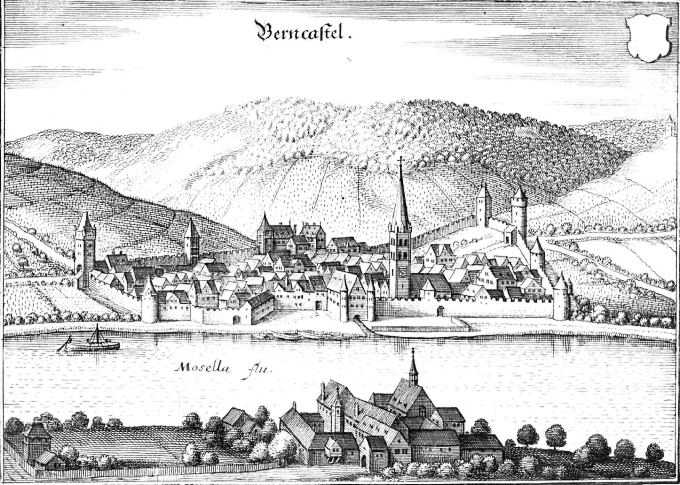
Copper engraving after Matthäus Merian

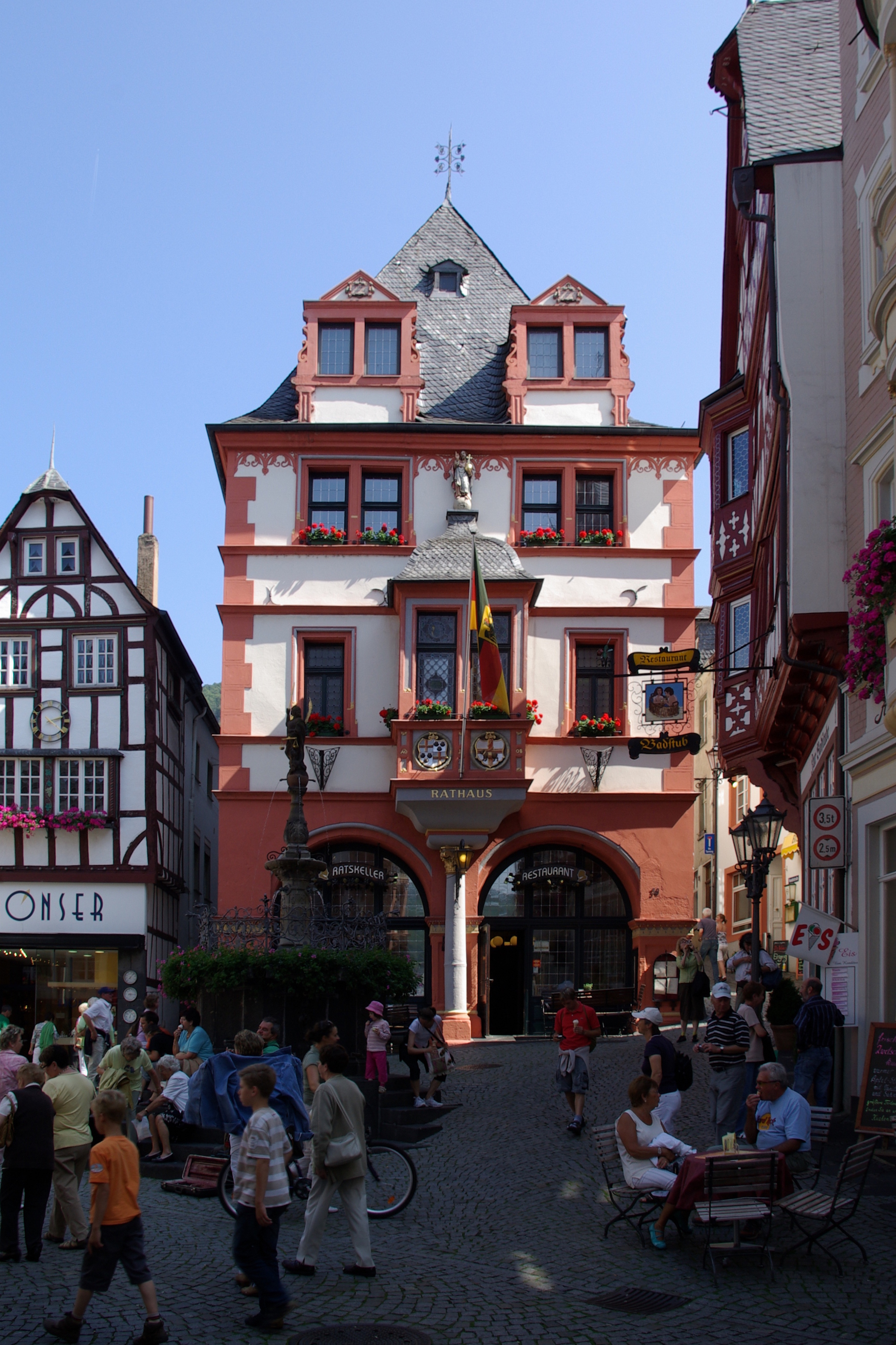
Town Hall

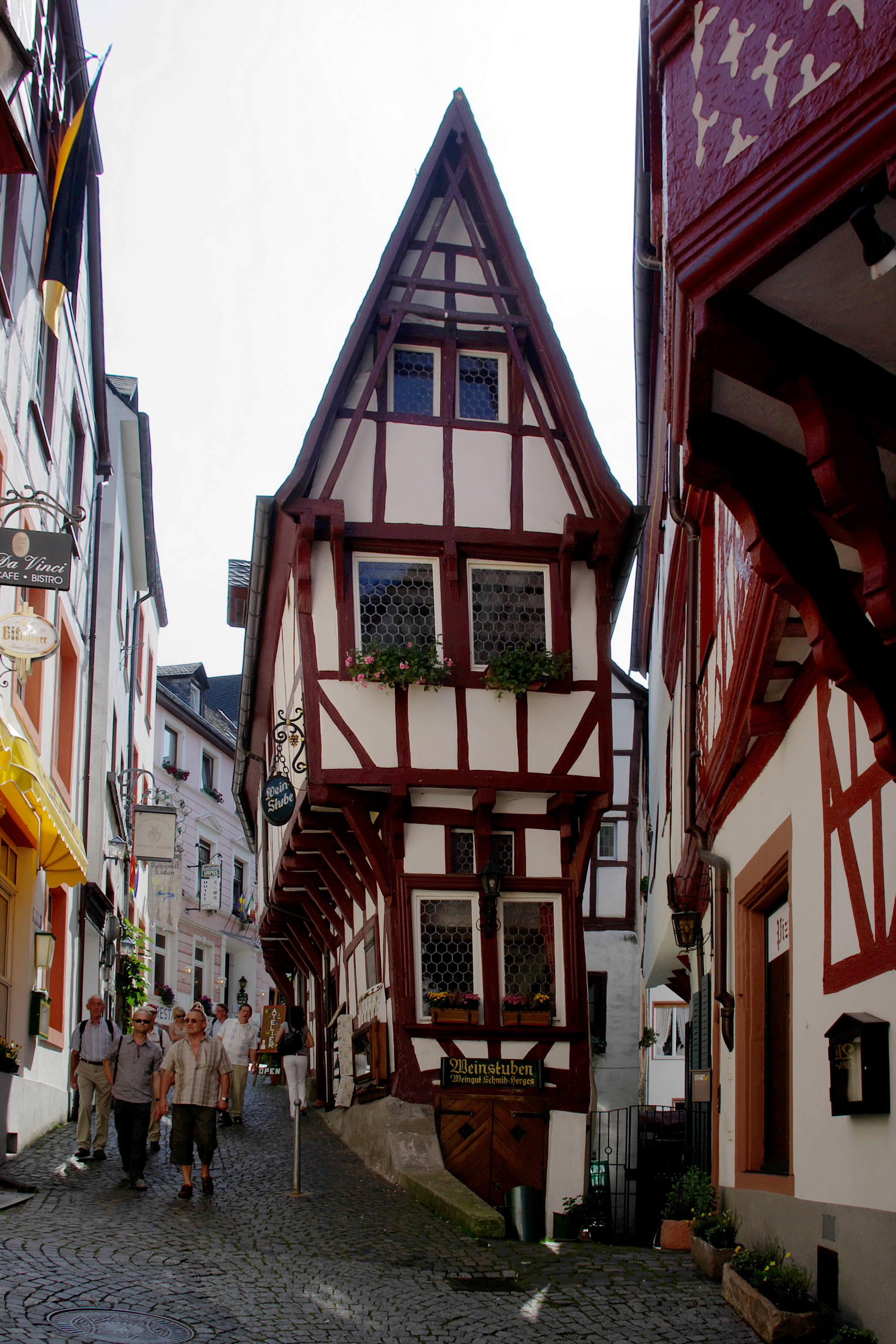
Spitzhäuschen

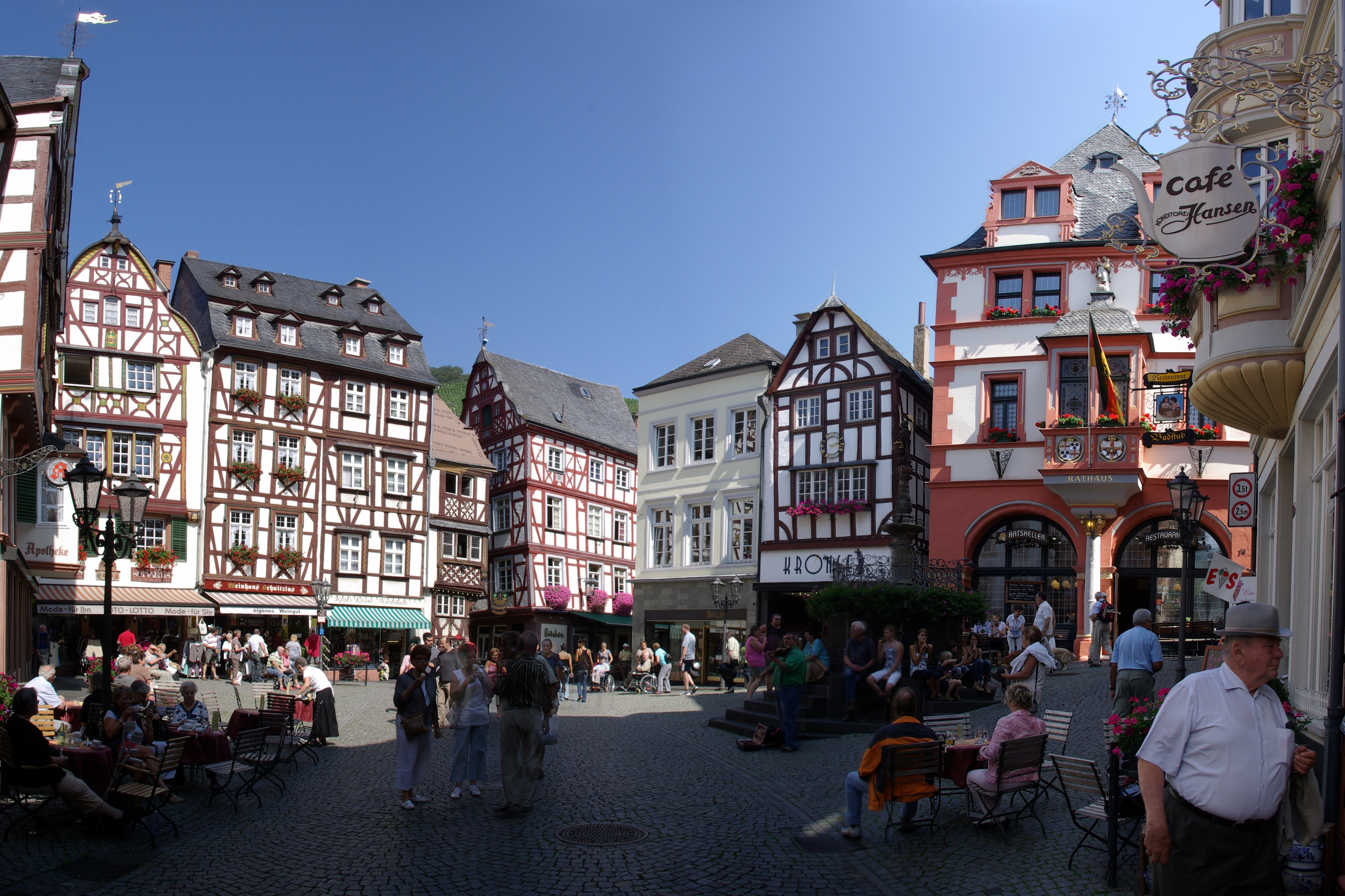
Marketplace

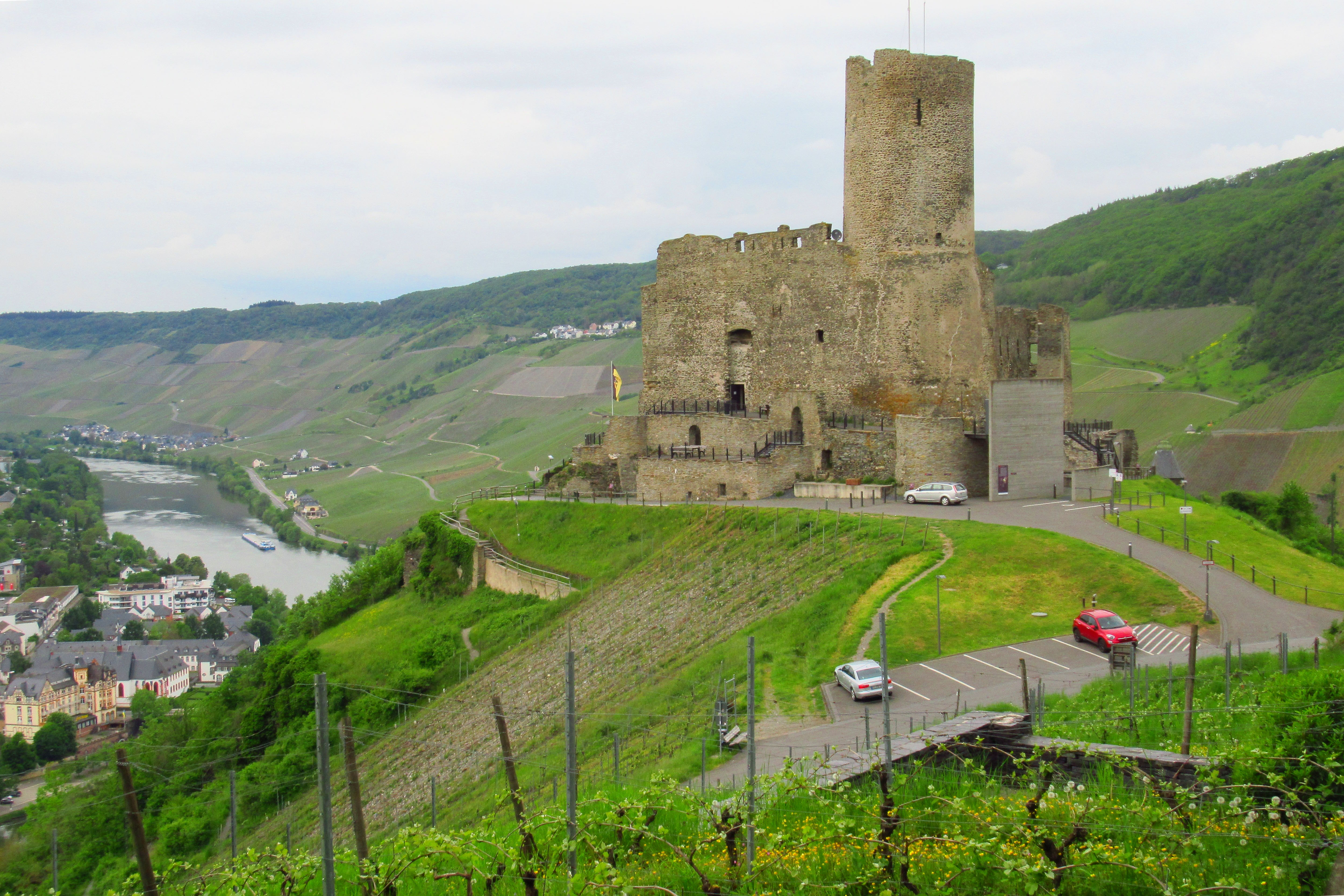
Ruins of Landshut Castle

Bernkastel-Kues (German pronunciation: [ˌbɛʁnkastl̩ˈkuːs]) is a town on the Middle Mosel in the Bernkastel-Wittlich district in Rhineland-Palatinate, Germany. It is well-known for its winegrowing. The town is a state-recognized health resort (Erholungsort), seat of the Verbandsgemeinde of Bernkastel-Kues and birthplace of one of the most famous German polymaths, the medieval churchman and philosopher Nikolaus von Kues (Cusanus).

== Geography ==
=== Location ===
Bernkastel-Kues lies in the Mosel valley, roughly 50 km (31 mi) from Trier. The greatest elevation is the Olymp (415 m above sea level), and the lowest point (107 m above sea level) lies on the Mosel's banks. The municipal area totals 23 657 101 m^{2}, of which 7 815 899 m^{2} is used for agriculture, thereby making Bernkastel-Kues one of the Middle Moselle's biggest towns by land area.

=== Neighbouring municipalities ===
Clockwise from the north, these are Graach, Longkamp, Monzelfeld, Veldenz, Mülheim, Lieser, Maring-Noviand, Platten and Zeltingen-Rachtig.

=== Constituent communities ===
Bernkastel-Kues is subdivided into the four Stadtteile of Andel, Bernkastel, Kues and Wehlen. The former two lie on the Moselle's right bank, while the latter two are on the left. All together, 7,794 people live in all four centres (3,696 men, 4,098 women), of whom 268 – or 3.44% – are foreigners.

==== Population structure ====
Stadtteil (as at 1/2006)	Inhabitants	Male	Female
Andel	788	378	410
Bernkastel	1087	539	548
Kues	4603	2121	2482
Wehlen	1262	658	604

=== Climate ===
The town lies in a transitional zone between temperate oceanic climate and continental climate. The barrier formed by the Eifel shields Bernkastel-Kues from west winds, putting it in a rain shadow and sometimes subjecting it to a föhn effect.

Yearly precipitation in Bernkastel-Kues amounts to 706 mm (27.8 in), falling into the middle third of the precipitation chart for all Germany. At 41% of the German Weather Service's weather stations lower figures are recorded. The driest month is February. The most rainfall comes in August. In that month, precipitation is 1.6 times what it is in February. Precipitation varies hardly at all, being evenly spread throughout the year. At only 22% of the weather stations are lower seasonal swings recorded.

== History ==
The earliest evidence of human habitation (3000 BC) was discovered by archaeologists in Kues. About AD 370, Decimus Magnus Ausonius, the Roman poet and teacher at the Imperial court, wrote his poem Mosella. Adalbero von Luxemburg (d. 1036 or 1037), Provost of the Trier Monastery of St. Paulin, became Lord of Bernkastel in the early 11th century.

=== Middle ages ===
In the first half of the 11th century, Bernkastel had its first documentary mention. At the turn of the 8th century, a geographer described a place called Princastellum. This is said to be evidence of a Roman castellum in the 4th century near today's Landshut castle ruin. Pointing to this are, among other things, fittings and finds of ceramic and iron underneath the castle. The 12th-century form of the name, Beronis castellum, was a learned re-Latinization, which was related to Adalbero von Luxemburg. Work was begun on the third castle building under the lordship of Archbishop of Trier Heinrich II of Finstingen. On 29 May 1291, King Rudolph I of Germany granted Berrincastel town rights. The castle, Burg Landshut, which was built at that time, was given this name only in the 16th century. In 1332, the town rights were reaffirmed by Emperor Louis the Bavarian's Sammelprivileg (a kind of omnibus decree that dealt with many rights and privileges). Under the terms of the Golden Bull of 1356, Bohemond II became Elector. According to legend, he was brought back to health from a serious illness by a glass of wine, giving rise to the legend of the Bernkastler Doctor winery. In 1401, Nikolaus von Kues, also known by his Latinized name Nicolaus Cusanus, was born in Moselle shipowner Henne Cryfftz's house, which is well preserved and can be visited. In 1451, the St.-Nikolaus-Hospital, a hospital for the poor, was built. In 1505, in an Electoral edict from Jakob II, the name Landshut for the archiepiscopal castle crops up for the first time. Emperor Maximilian I spent a night in Bernkastel in 1512 on the way to the Imperial Diet at Trier. The Plague raged in Bernkastel in 1627, and in Kues in 1641. In 1692, Castle Landshut fell victim to fire and since then it has been a ruin.

=== Modern history ===
From 1794 to 1814, Bernkastel was a cantonal chef-lieu under French rule. At the Congress of Vienna in 1815, Bernkastel and Kues were annexed to the Kingdom of Prussia. In 1821 Bernkastel became a district seat. In 1848, the Revolution came to Bernkastel as it had to many of the then politically disunited German lands: The black-red-gold flag was hoisted at the town hall and a militia was formed. The first road bridge between Bernkastel and Kues was built between 1872 and 1874, as was the first railway link in 1882 and 1883. In 1891, Bernkastel marked its 600-year jubilee as a town. The town in its current form came into being on 1 April 1905 through the merger of the town of Bernkastel with the winemaking village of Kues across the river. In 1926 there arose great unrest among winemakers along the Moselle, and the financial office in Bernkastel and the customs office in Kues were stormed. On Kristallnacht (9 November 1938), there were great riots against Jewish inhabitants, and the synagogue was destroyed. In 1946, the first democratic elections after the Second World War were held. Hans Weber became mayor. In 1970, Andel and Wehlen were amalgamated with the town. With administrative reform in Rhineland-Palatinate, the Verbandsgemeinde of Bernkastel-Kues was formed through the merger of the Ämter of Bernkastel-Land, Lieser, Mülheim, Zeltingen and the town of Bernkastel-Kues. In 1997, the Burgbergtunnel, a traffic bypass, had its festive opening. Bernkastel-Kues was the host town for the annual Intercamp Camporee for the year 2008. Scouting councils from the USA, Canada, the Czech Republic, Germany, France, and many other European countries attended the event on May 9–11. In 2000 began the partnership between Bernkastel-Kues and Karlovy Vary in the Czech Republic. In 2005, the town celebrated the centenary of the merger of Bernkastel and Kues, and the municipality became a “climatic health resort” (Heilklimatischer Kurort).

== Politics ==
=== Town council ===
The council is made up of 22 council members, who were elected by proportional representation at the municipal election held on 7 June 2009, and the honorary mayor as chairman.

The municipal election held on 7 June 2009 yielded the following results:

	SPD	CDU	FDP	GRÜNE	UBU (Unabhängige Bürgerunion)	Total
2009	3	9	4	3	3	22 seats
2004	3	11	3	3	2	22 seats

=== Mayors ===
The honorary mayor is Wolfgang Port (CDU). He was first elected in 2000 and last re-elected in 2019 with 61.6% of the votes.

Port's predecessor, Helmut Gestrich, was mayor beginning in 1994 and was reëlected in 1999, but he resigned the mayoralty on 22 November 2000 after having been linked to the so-called Doerfert Affair (a corruption scandal; its namesake, Hans-Joachim Doerfert, was sentenced to seven years and three months for fraud and breach of trust, although he only served five years).

=== Coat of arms ===
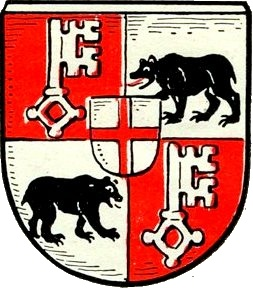
Town's old arms

Coat of arms of Bernkastel-Kues

The town's arms might be described thus: Quarterly, first and fourth sable a key palewise argent, the wards to chief and sinister, second Or a bear passant of the first, and third Or a crayfish palewise gules, the head to chief.

The arms borne until 1951 were similar, but there were two notable differences:

- The third quarter bore another bear, like the second quarter, but it was turned to sinister (armsbearer's left, viewer's right);
- There was a silver inescutcheon at the fess point (centre) charged with a red cross, (i.e., the arms of the Archbishopric of Trier).

The keys are meant to be the keys of heaven held by Saint Peter, to whom the Archbishopric of Trier is consecrated. The bear is the town's armorial bearing, and is canting (“bear” is Bär in German). The crayfish, also canting, as the blazon calls it a Krebs (a word applied to any of a number of crustacean creatures), stands for Nikolaus von Kues, whose family name was Cryfftz (the same as Krebs in High German). There are only two other towns in Germany whose arms bear a crustacean charge, namely Bad Wurzach in the Allgäu and Cottbus.

== Culture and sightseeing ==
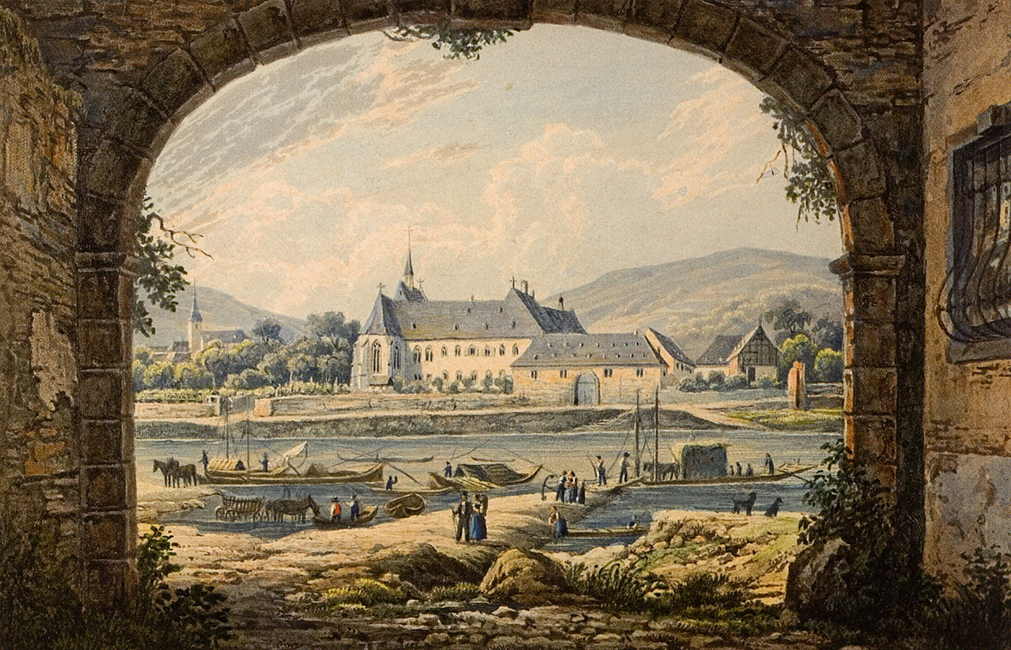
Hospital Cues (Cusanusstift) in Bernkastel-Kues in 1831. Hand-coloured aquatint engraving by F. Hegi after Karl Bodmer.

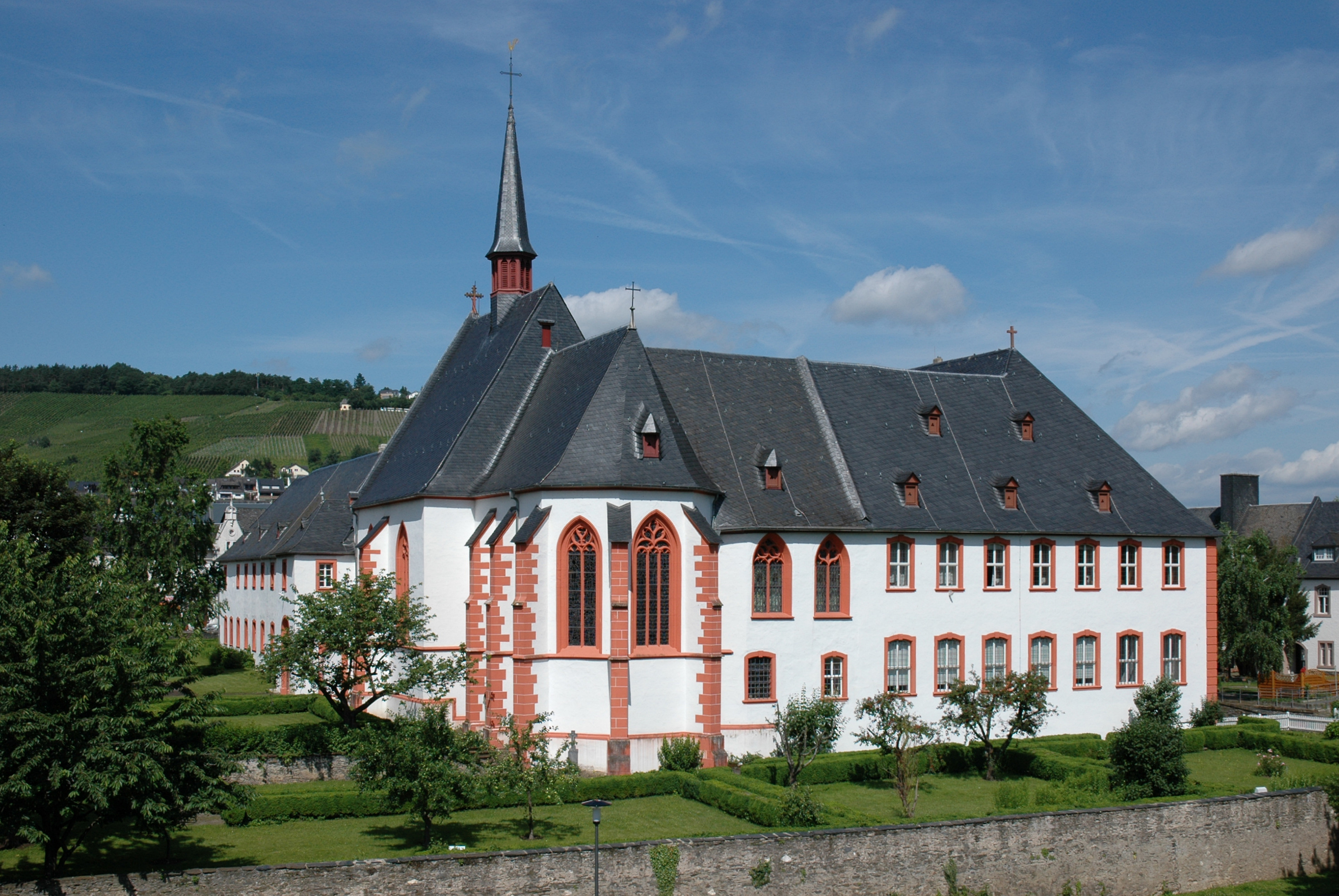
Cusanusstift, east view from the Moselle bridge

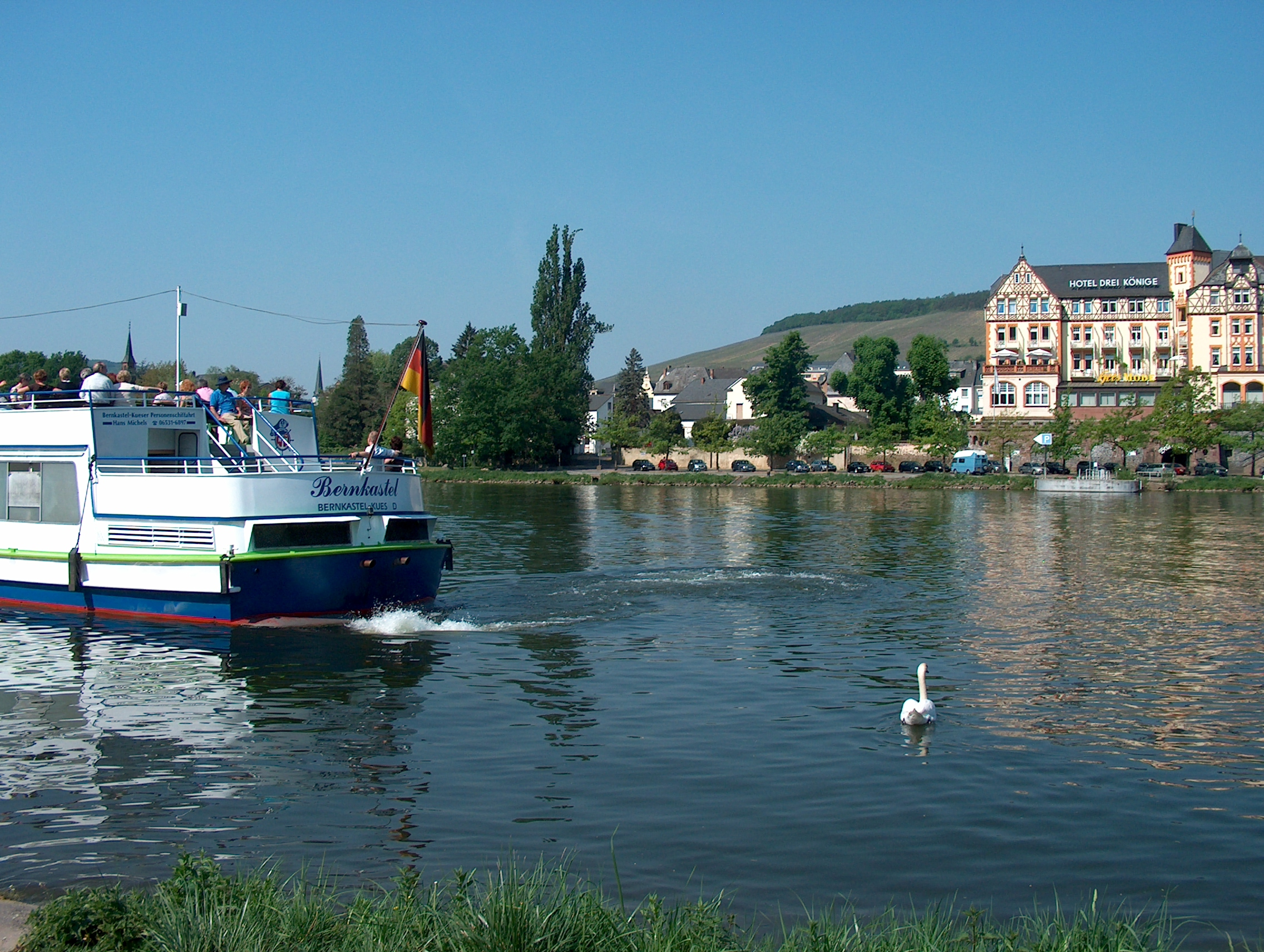
The Moselle near Bernkastel-Kues.

Worth seeing in Bernkastel is the mediaeval marketplace with its gabled timber-frame houses from the 17th century, foremost among which is the narrow Spitzhäuschen (“Pointed House”) from 1416. Around the St. Michaelsbrunnen (“Saint Michael’s Fountain”) from 1606 gathers a row of well-preserved buildings and also the Renaissance Town Hall from 1608. The Graach Gate is an often visited tourist attraction. Above the constituent community of Bernkastel lie the Castle Landshut ruins, a former summer residence of the Archbishops of Trier that was destroyed by fire on 8 January 1692. It today serves as a popular lookout point over the Moselle valley. Also worth seeing is the only town gate that is still standing, the Graacher Tor (“Graach Gate”).

The town furthermore has several squares at its disposal; beyond the mediaeval marketplace are the Platz am Bärenbrunnen (“Square at the Bear’s Fountain”) and the Karlsbader Platz (“Karlovy Vary Square” – named after the partner town, which is called Karlsbad in German) opened in July 2005. The Doctorbrunnen (“Doctor Fountain”) depicts scenes of the old legend about a local wine, the famous "Bernkasteler Doctor". Another well-known point of interest is the Late Gothic St. Nikolaus-Hospital (Cusanusstift), an Electoral complex of Nikolaus von Kues. The institution's library has an outstanding scientific range of works. It is also well known for its chapel, where the heart of the great philosopher, cardinal and polymath Nikolaus von Kues (Cusanus) is buried. Near the outlying centre of Wehlen lies the former Machern Monastery in whose rooms are now found a winery, a house brewery and a restaurant.

=== Regular events ===
- MoselMusikFestival (May to October)
- Weinfest der Mittelmosel (“Wine Festival of the Middle Moselle”, each year on the first weekend in September) – with, among other things, a parade and fireworks
- Christmas market in the mediaeval town. Many local vendors sell everything from mulled wine to handmade trinkets.
- Tage alter Chormusik (“Days of Choir Music”, each year in the week after Easter
- International rowing regatta on the Moselle for the Grüner Moselpokal (“Green Moselle Cup”) in September
- Mittelalter-Spectacel (a mediaeval spectacle, every other year)
- Bernkastel-Kueser Reitertage (“Riding Days”)
- Moselfestwochen (classic music festival)
- Straßenfest (street fair) in the constituent community of Kues
- Tage der offenen Weinkeller (“Open Wine Cellar Days”) in the constituent community of Kues where the winemakers of Kues present and sell their wine in their own wine cellars.
- Annual horse show on the Easter weekend

== Economy and infrastructure ==
=== Public institutions ===
==== Education ====
- Nikolaus-von-Kues-Gymnasium
- Freiherr-vom-Stein-Realschule
- Hauptschule with all-day school
- Grundschule Kues (Cusanusschule) (primary school)
- Grundschule Wehlen (primary school)
- Professional training schools (Berufsbildende Schulen) with professional school (Berufsfachschule) I and II, upper professional school (Berufsoberschule)
- Hotelfachschule and Höhere Berufsfachschule für Hotelmanagement
- Medizinisches Ausbildungszentrum Moseltal, Fachschule für Physiotherapie (medical training centre, specialization in physiotherapy)
- Burg-Landshut-Schule für Lernbehinderte (for students with learning difficulties)
- Rosenbergschule (special school with focus on holistic development)

==== Authorities ====
- Amtsgericht
- Bundesagentur für Arbeit (Federal agency for labour)
- Cusanus-Krankenhaus (hospital, part of CTT Verbundkrankenhaus Bernkastel-Wittlich)
- Dienstleistungszentrum Ländlicher Raum (a Rhineland-Palatinate institution that concerns itself with a broad array of matters relating to agriculture, winegrowing and oenology, schools teaching in agricultural disciplines, and many other related things, in both advisory and developmental capacities)
- Finanzamt Bernkastel-Wittlich (financial office – branch location)
- Kraftfahrzeugzulassungsstelle Bernkastel-Wittlich (vehicle licensing centre – branch location)
- Polizeiinspektion (police service)
- Verbandsgemeindeverwaltung Bernkastel-Kues (Verbandsgemeinde administration)
- Vermessungs- und Katasteramt (surveying and cadastral office)
- Wasser- und Schifffahrtsamt Trier (water and shipping office – branch location)
- Wasserschutzpolizei (water protection police)

=== Established businesses ===
- Mageba, a producer of textile machinery
- Median Kliniken GmbH with its rehabilitation centre, biggest employer in the Bernkastel-Wittlich district
- Moselland eG, biggest winemaking cooperative in Rhineland-Palatinate, turnover: €47,500,000
- Peter Mertes Weinkellerei GmbH, biggest German winery, turnover: €130,000,000 (2004)

=== Winegrowing ===
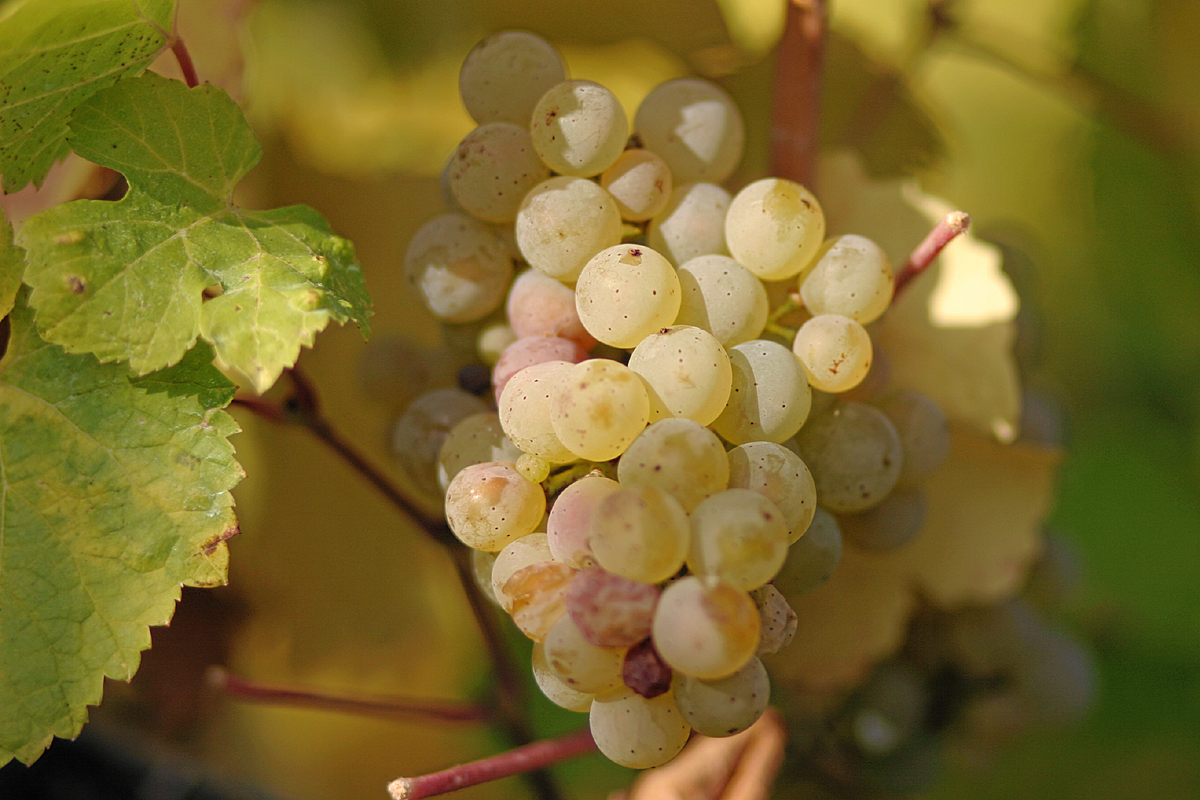
Riesling grapes

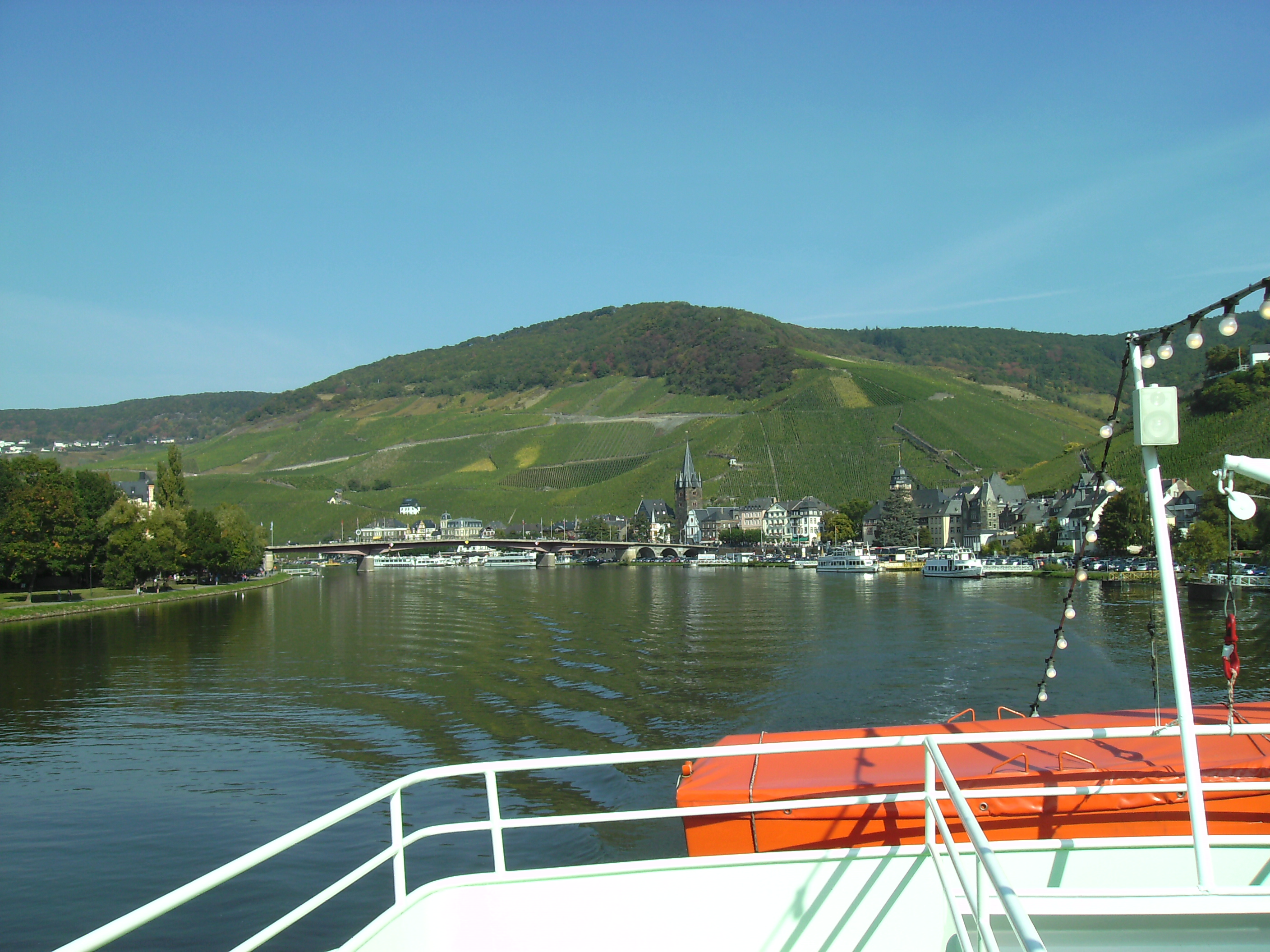
Bernkastel with the “Doctor” vineyard

Historically, the most important economic sector has been winegrowing. Within the Bernkastel area, vines are worked overwhelmingly in steep-slope vineyards in an area of 5,844 ha. There are still many wineries in Bernkastel-Kues today. Riesling is the customary grape variety, although smaller quantities of other varieties, such as Burgunder, Rivaner, Kerner and Dornfelder, are also grown.

Within town limits, the wine making appellations – Großlagen – Münzlay (Wehlen), Badstube (Bernkastel) and Kurfürstlay (Bernkastel, Kues and Andel) are represented by the following vineyards:

- Andeler Goldschatz
- Bernkasteler Alte Badstube am Doctorberg
- Bernkasteler Bratenhöfchen
- Bernkasteler Doctor
- Bernkasteler Johannisbrünnchen
- Bernkasteler Lay
- Bernkasteler Matheisbildchen
- Bernkasteler Graben
- Bernkastel-Kueser Kardinalsberg
- Bernkastel-Kueser Rosenberg
- Bernkastel-Kueser Schlossberg
- Bernkastel-Kueser Stephanus Rosengärtchen
- Bernkastel-Kueser Weisenstein
- Wehlener Abtei
- Wehlener Hofberg
- Wehlener Klosterberg
- Wehlener Nonnenberg
- Wehlener Sonnenuhr

=== Transport ===
==== Road ====
Bernkastel-Kues lies on Bundesstraßen 50 and 53. With the opening of the Burgbergtunnel (550 m), heavy traffic in the constituent community of Bernkastel was alleviated. Also, two bridges are found in town, one of which is the only suspension bridge across the Moselle. Both were renovated in the 1990s. Public transport is integrated into the Verkehrsverbund Region Trier (VRT), whose fares therefore apply.

==== Rail ====
Until 31 December 1962, the narrow gauge Moseltalbahn, also called the Saufbähnchen, ran through Bernkastel-Kues. The railway station building stands at the water's edge in the constituent community of Bernkastel (right bank). Furthermore, there was a Deutsche Bahn terminal station in the constituent community of Kues (left bank) whence a further railway track, the Wengerohr–Bernkastel-Kues line, linked the town with Wittlich and the Moselle line (Cannons Railway). Both railways are disused and the tracks have been torn up. The slate-block railway station building, built “Moselle-style” in the early 20th century by Reichsbahn building director Franz Schenk, has likewise been preserved. An adjoining goods building was restored and is now used as a multifunctional building (Güterhalle). In what was once the track area there was at first an unsecured carpark. Now here is the Forum Alter Bahnhof, a municipal service centre with an underground parking garage. The track itself was first converted as far as Lieser into the Mosel-Radweg (cycling trail), and then later into the Maare-Mosel-Radweg through Wittlich to Daun in the Eifel.

==== Water ====
Bernkastel-Kues is a stop on Rhine-Mosel cruises. Along the shore of the Mosel are many landing stages from which there are many tours daily.

== Notable people ==
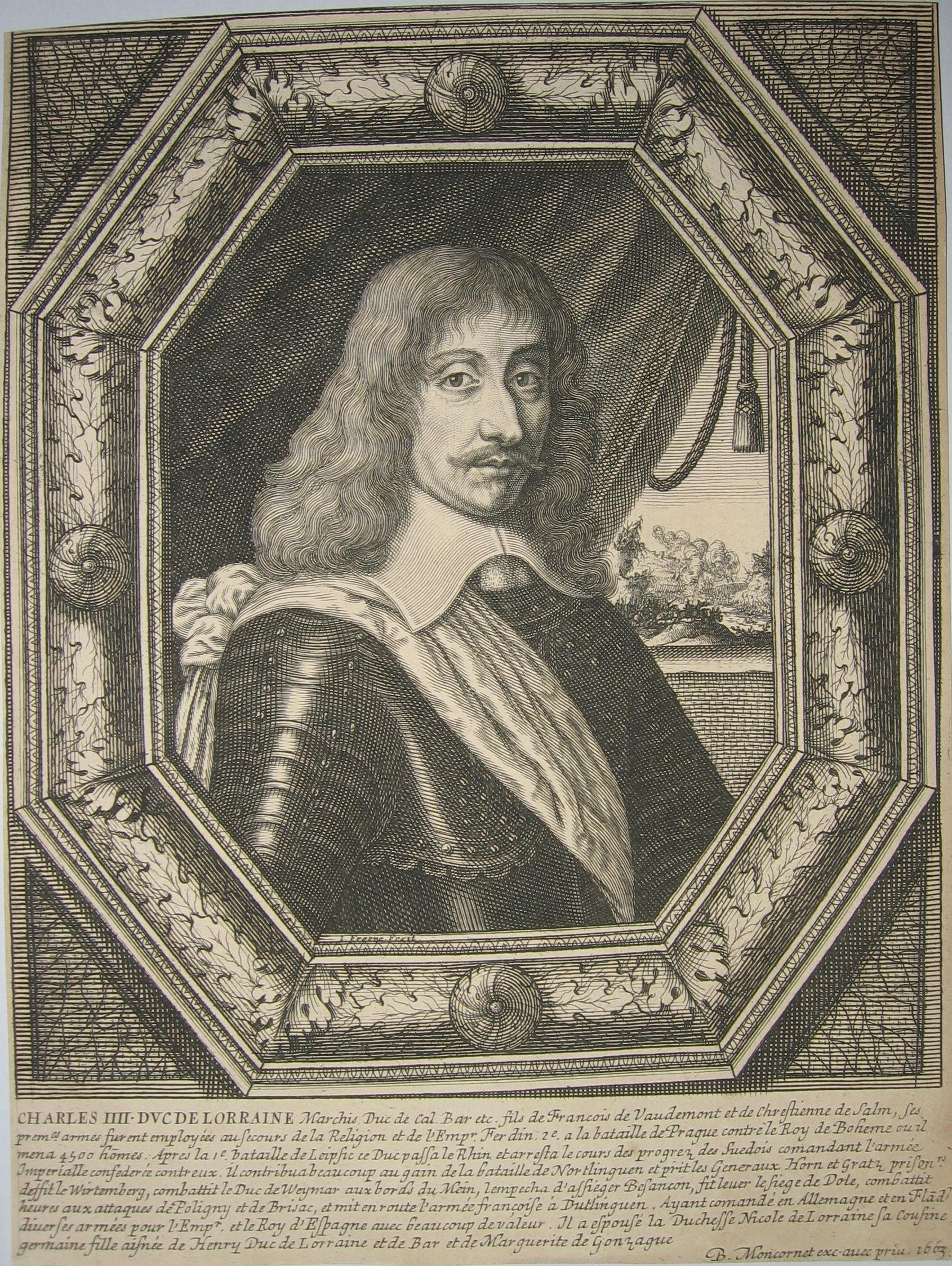
Charles IV de Lorraine 1663

- Nikolaus von Kues (Cusanus) (1401–1464), philosopher, theologian, jurist and astronomer
- Charles IV, Duke of Lorraine (1604–1675), Duke of Lorraine, died in Bernkastel
- Hermann Schroeder (1904–1984), composer
- Heiner Thiel (born 1957), sculptor and curator
- Stuart Pigott (born 1960), British, wine specialist, author and journalist

== Twin towns – sister cities ==
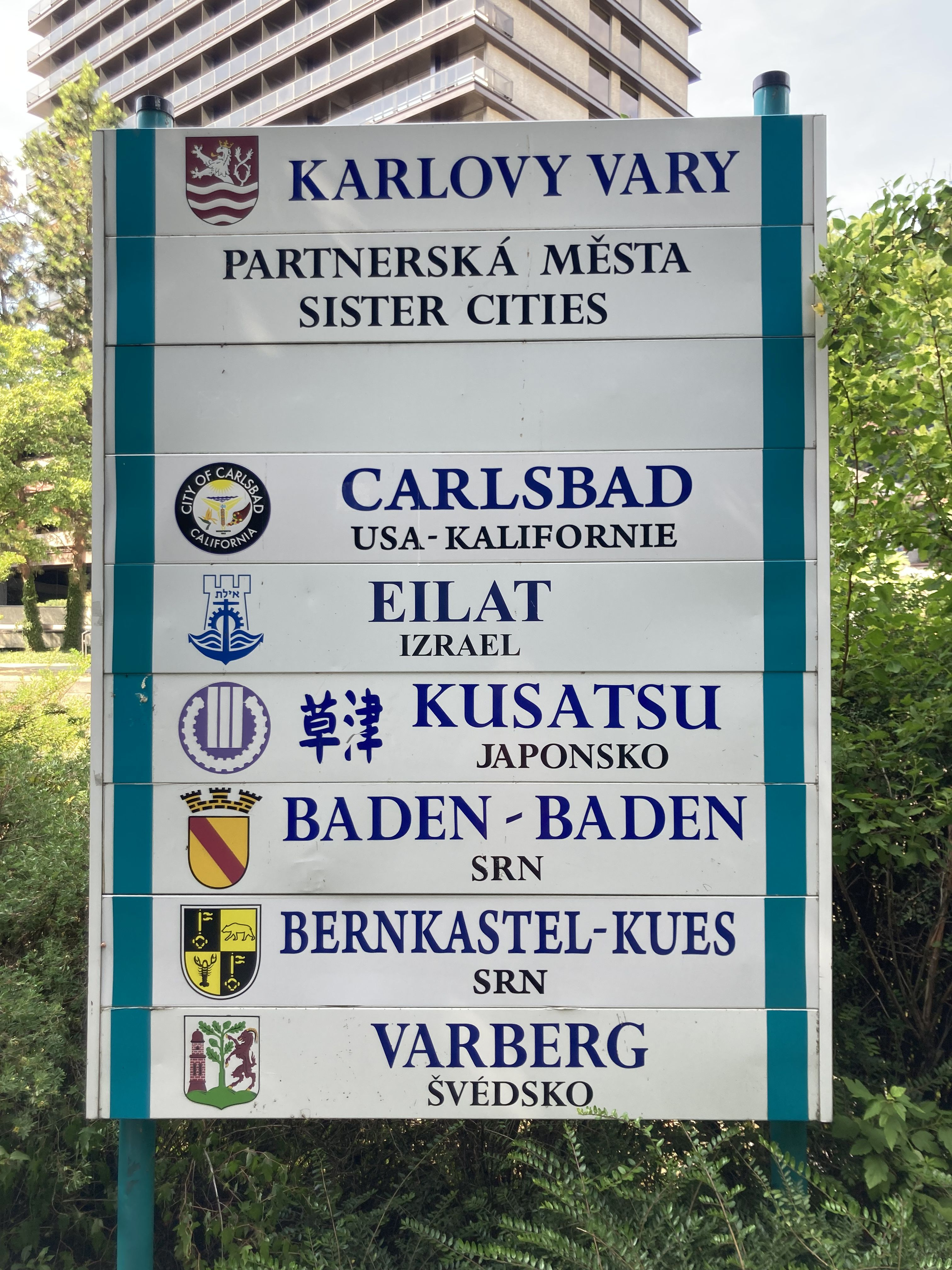
Sign of Karlovy Vary's sister cities

Bernkastel-Kues is twinned with:

- Karlovy Vary, Czech Republic

== In popular culture ==
Bernkastel is the name of a character in the Japanese visual novel series Umineko: When They Cry.

== Panorama ==
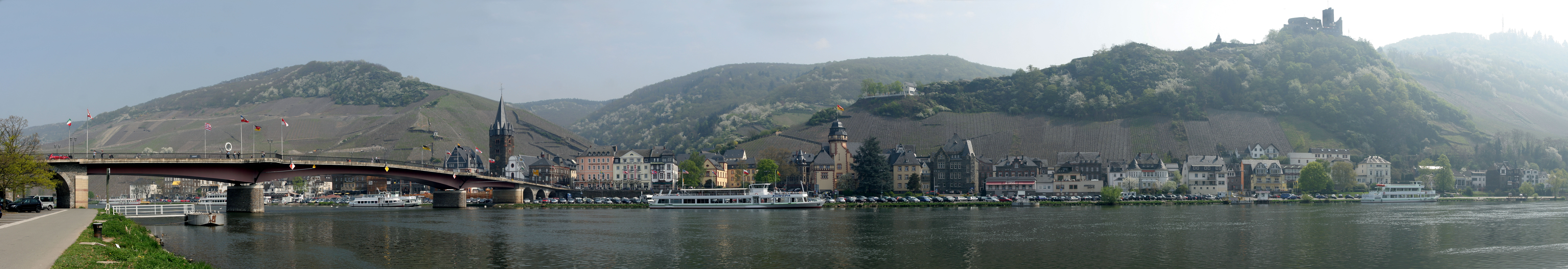
180° panorama of Bernkastel from the Moselle’s bank in Kues
