= Lieser, Germany =

Lieser
- Municipality
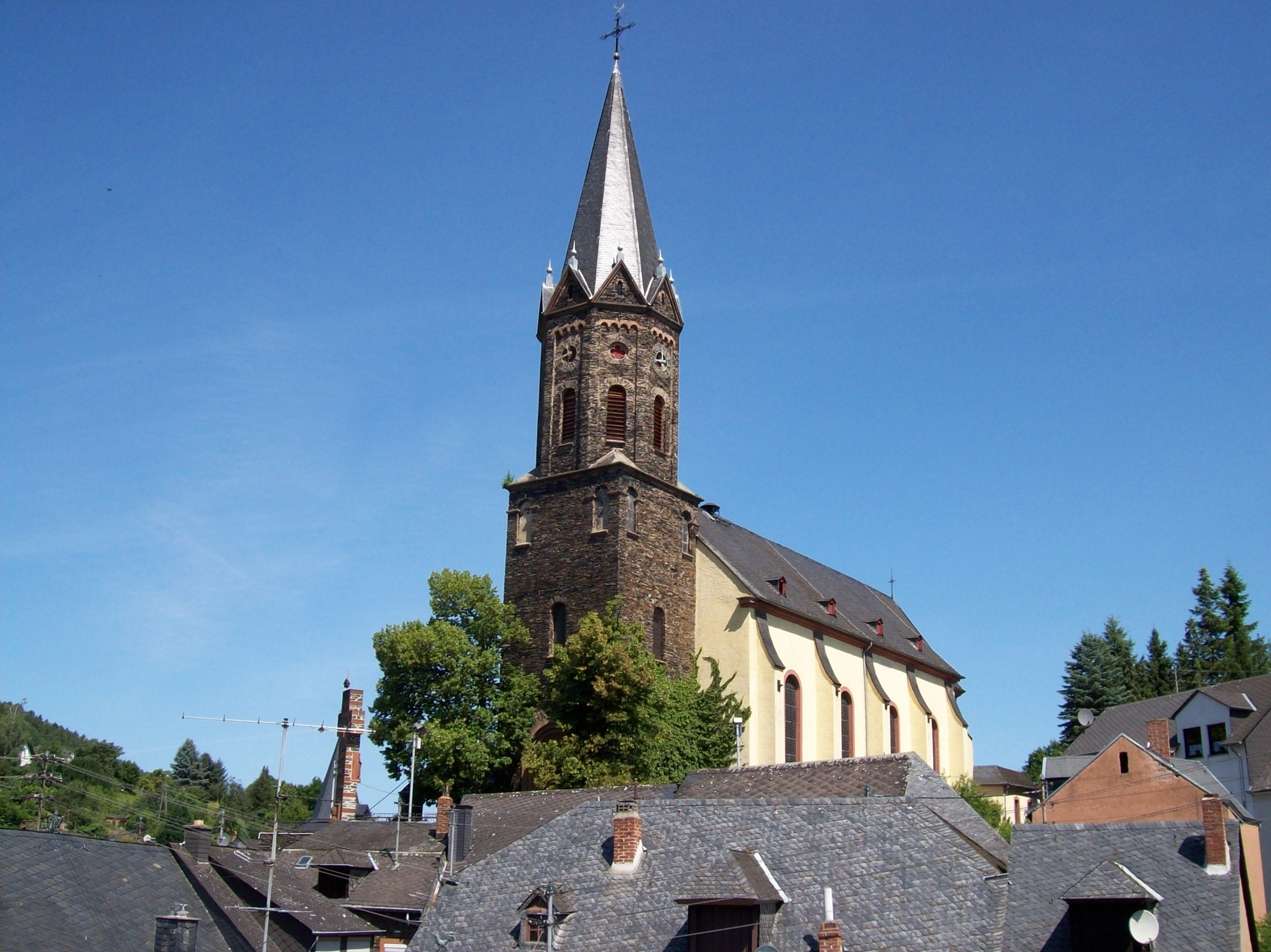
- Church of Saint Peter

- Coat of arms

- Location of Lieser within Bernkastel-Wittlich district
- Interactive map of Lieser
- Location within Germany Location within Rhineland-Palatinate
- Coordinates: 49°55′2″N 7°1′19″E
- Country: Germany
- State: Rhineland-Palatinate
- District: Bernkastel-Wittlich
- Municipal assoc.: Bernkastel-Kues

Government
  - Mayor (2019–24): Jochen Kiesgen

Area
  - Total: 5.43 km^{2} (2.10 sq mi)
- Elevation: 117 m (384 ft)

Population (2025-12-31)
  - Total: 1,240
  - Density: 228/km^{2} (591/sq mi)
- Time zone: UTC+01:00 (CET)
  - Summer (DST): UTC+02:00 (CEST)
- Postal codes: 54470
- Dialling codes: 06531
- Vehicle registration: WIL
- Website: www.lieser-mosel.de

Lieser (German pronunciation: [ˈliːzɐ]) is an Ortsgemeinde – a municipality belonging to a Verbandsgemeinde, a kind of collective municipality – in the Bernkastel-Wittlich district in Rhineland-Palatinate, Germany.

== Geography ==
=== Location ===
Lieser belongs to the Verbandsgemeinde of Bernkastel-Kues, whose seat is in the like-named town. It lies on the Middle Moselle and is named after the river Lieserbach, which empties into the Moselle west of Lieser. The village is shaped like an upside-down T (when viewed from the south) as many houses have been built below the vineyards, along the Moselle's bank. The older part of the lower village exhibits tight terraced housing development with vineyards lying behind, owing to the intensive winegrowing. Rising up over the village is the Late Baroque Saint Peter's Parish Church (Pfarrkirche St. Peter)

== History ==
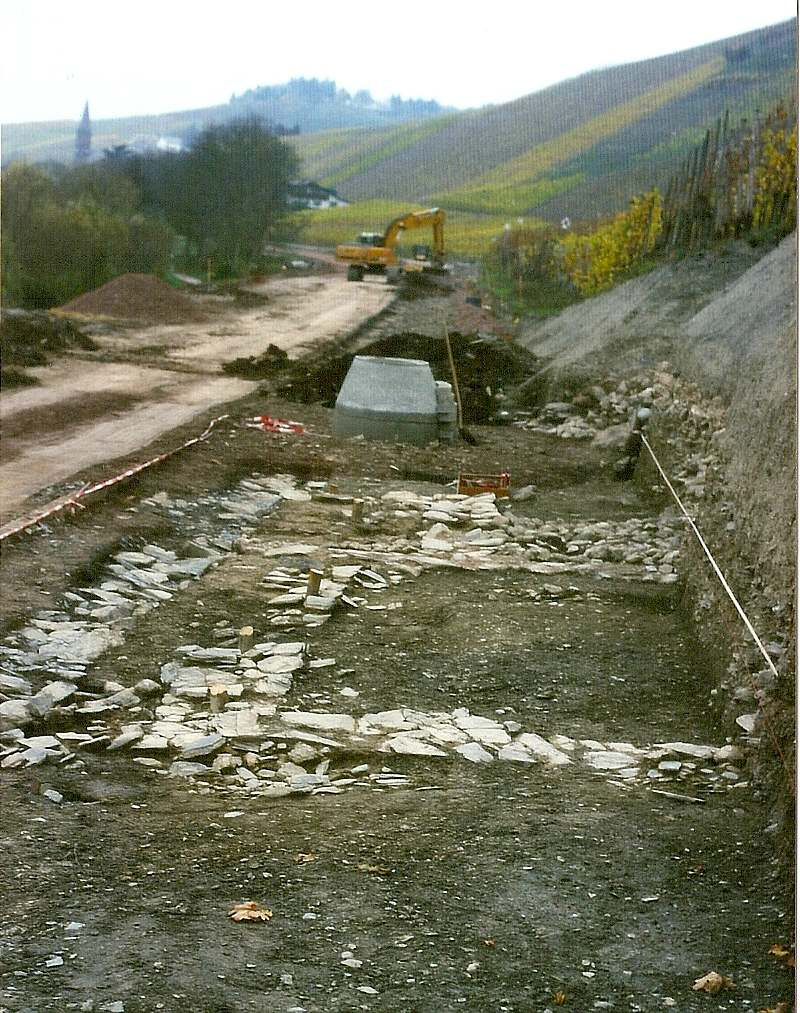
Roman winepressing facility, discovered in 2005, in the background at left, the village

Archaeological finds reveal that settlement history reaches back to Roman times. Witnessing this are the remnants of a Roman aqueduct on the Paulsberg (mountain) above Lieser, surface finds of Roman tiles and a Roman winepressing facility unearthed in 2005 during roadworks at the riverbank. This lay below the vineyards, some 500 m east of the village, but after an emergency excavation, it was filled in again.

In 817, the village had its first documentary mention as Lisura. According to documents from 1085 and 1165, a great part of the land in Lieser belonged “together with the church and its tithes, vineyards and cropfields…” to the Abbey of Saint-Hubert, which was subordinate to the Prince-Bishopric of Liège (nowadays in Belgium). Alongside this, the Prince-Archbishop-Elector of Trier also had landholdings in Lieser about 1200. In 1575, the Abbey of Saint-Hubert sold its holdings to Prince-Archbishop-Elector of Trier Jakob III of Eltz. Further landholders were, among others, the Collegiate Foundations of St. Paulin and St. Simeon in Trier, as well as Himmerod Abbey. The villagers earned their livelihood mainly from winegrowing, and as tenants they had to pay tithes and other levies. Only at Secularization under Napoleon did the winemakers become the vineyard owners.

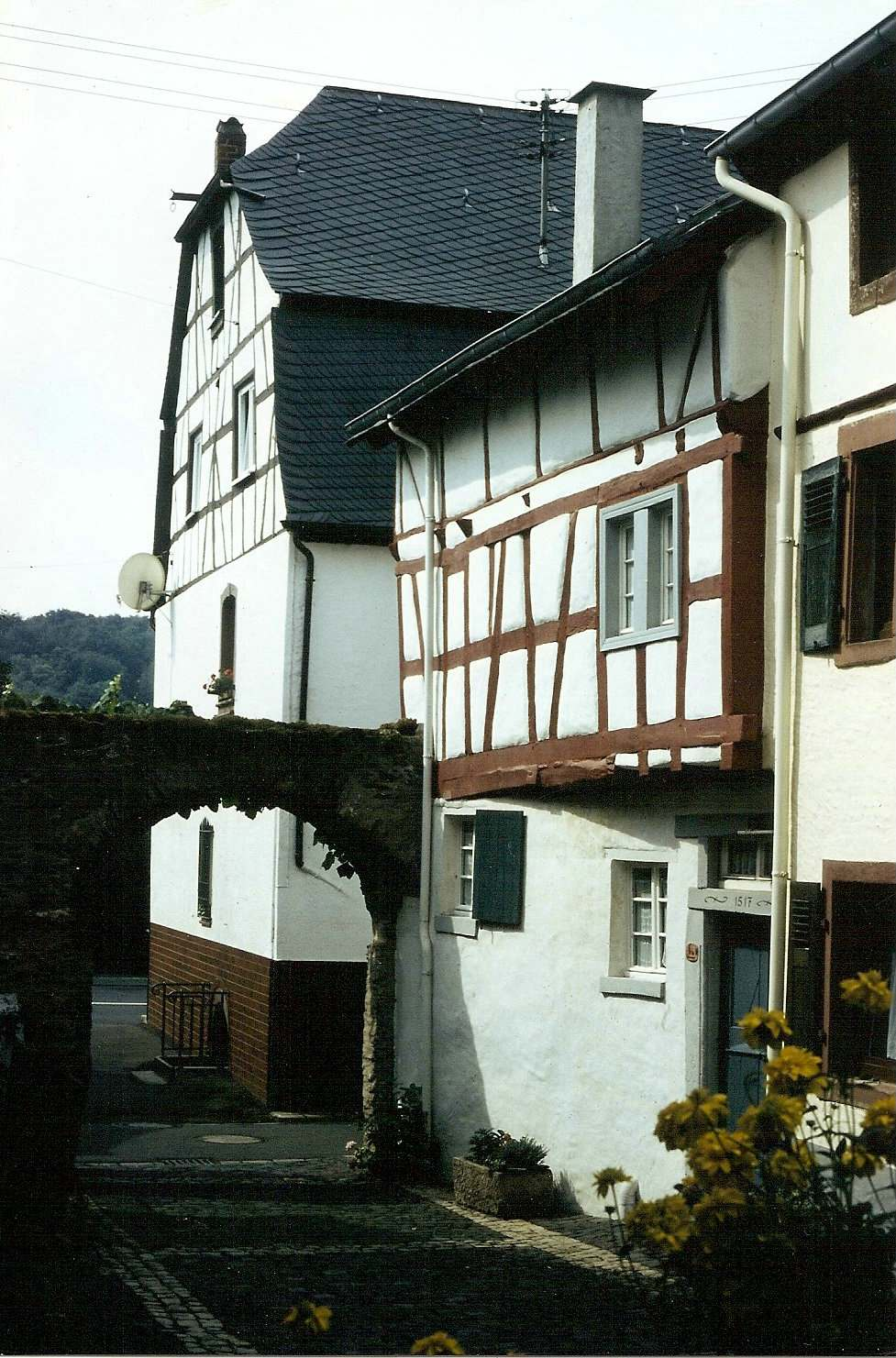
Houses at the Postal Estate

Lieser lay on the Imperial road from Trier to Mainz and had at its disposal a ferry across the Moselle. Given this favourable location, a postal station was established in this unfortified village in the early 16th century on the Dutch Postal Route (Niederländischer Postkurs) from Brussels by way of Augsburg to Innsbruck and Italy. This exposed location on the Imperial road, however, also led to frequent plunderings in times of war. In 1693 and 1698, during Louis XIV's wars of conquest, pontoon bridges were set up across the Moselle to quicken troop transport across the river.

Until French Revolutionary troops in 1794 marched in, Lieser belonged to the Electorate of Trier and the High Court of Bernkastel, to which it even sent Schöffen (roughly “lay jurists”). In 1798, while still under the Directoire, Bernkastel became the cantonal chef-lieu. In 1800, under Napoleon, the Mairie de Lieser came into being, to which also Kesten, Maring-Noviand, Filzen and Wintrich belonged. After the Battle of Leipzig, Filzen and Wintrich were assigned to the Bürgermeisterei of Mülheim while Wehlen and Kues (until 1905) were assigned to the newly formed Bürgermeisterei of Lieser. At the Congress of Vienna, the Rhineland together with the former Electorate of Trier and Lieser became Prussian. Beginning in 1816, Lieser belonged to the district of Bernkastel in the Regierungsbezirk of Trier.

In the latter half of the 19th century, Lieser flourished as the Puricelli family of industrialists built a villa in the west of the village between 1884 and 1887 after Baron Clemens von Schorlemer married into the family. Towards the end of the 19th century, the villa was expanded into a Schloss (château or residential castle). Kaiser Wilhelm II, who was the Baron's friend, visited Lieser in 1906, 1911 and 1913. Beginning in 1883, Lieser was connected to the railway network by the Maare-Mosel-Bahn, which was a branchline off the Koblenz-Trier line leading from Wittlich-Wengerohr through Lieser to Bernkastel-Kues, and which existed until 1988.

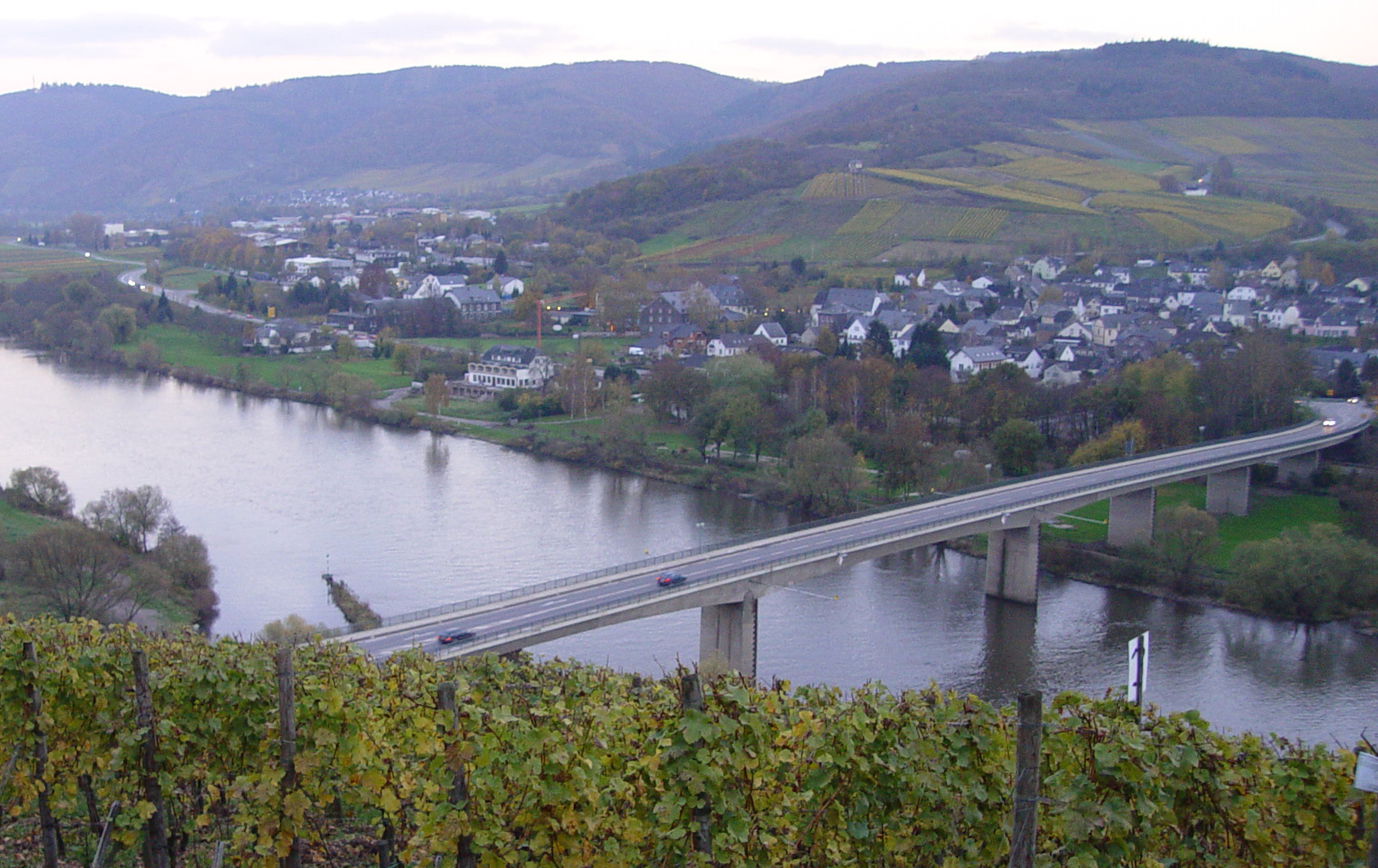
Bridge from Lieser to Mülheim

The building of the Moselle Bridge put a permanent end to ferry service on 9 April 1968. Since the turn of the 21st century, Lieser has had at its disposal a flood control dyke on the site of the former railway embankment.

Since administrative reform in the 1970s, the municipality of Lieser has belonged to the Verbandsgemeinde of Bernkastel-Kues.

== Politics ==
=== Municipal council ===
The council is made up of 16 council members, who were elected by proportional representation at the municipal election held on 7 June 2009, and the honorary mayor as chairman. The 16 seats on council are shared among the three voters’ groups Stettler (9 seats), FBLieser (5 seats) and Zeltner (2 seats).

=== Coat of arms ===
The municipality's arms might be described thus: Per pale argent two keys in saltire gules, the wards to chief and turned outwards, the key bendwise sinister surmounting the other, and gules a vine palewise embowed to dexter towards chief and slipped in base, fructed of one bunch of grapes, all proper, in a point in point sable a post horn Or, the bell to sinister and the coil to chief.

The keys on the dexter (armsbearer's right, viewer's left) side stand for the two churches in Lieser, one for the old Saint Paul's Church (Paulskirche), which stands outside the village in the vineyards, and the other for Saint Peter's Church (Petruskirche), which stands in the village. The grapevine on the sinister (armsbearer's left, viewer's right) side stands for the municipality's winegrowing, which is historically witnessed all the way back to Roman times. The post horn in the “point in point” (peaked base) stands for the old postal estate in Lieser, which in the 16th and 17th centuries was used as a postal way station on the Dutch Postal Route (Niederländischer Postkurs) run by the Princely house of Thurn und Taxis from Brussels by way of Augsburg to Innsbruck and Italy.

The arms have been borne since 1935.

== Culture and sightseeing ==
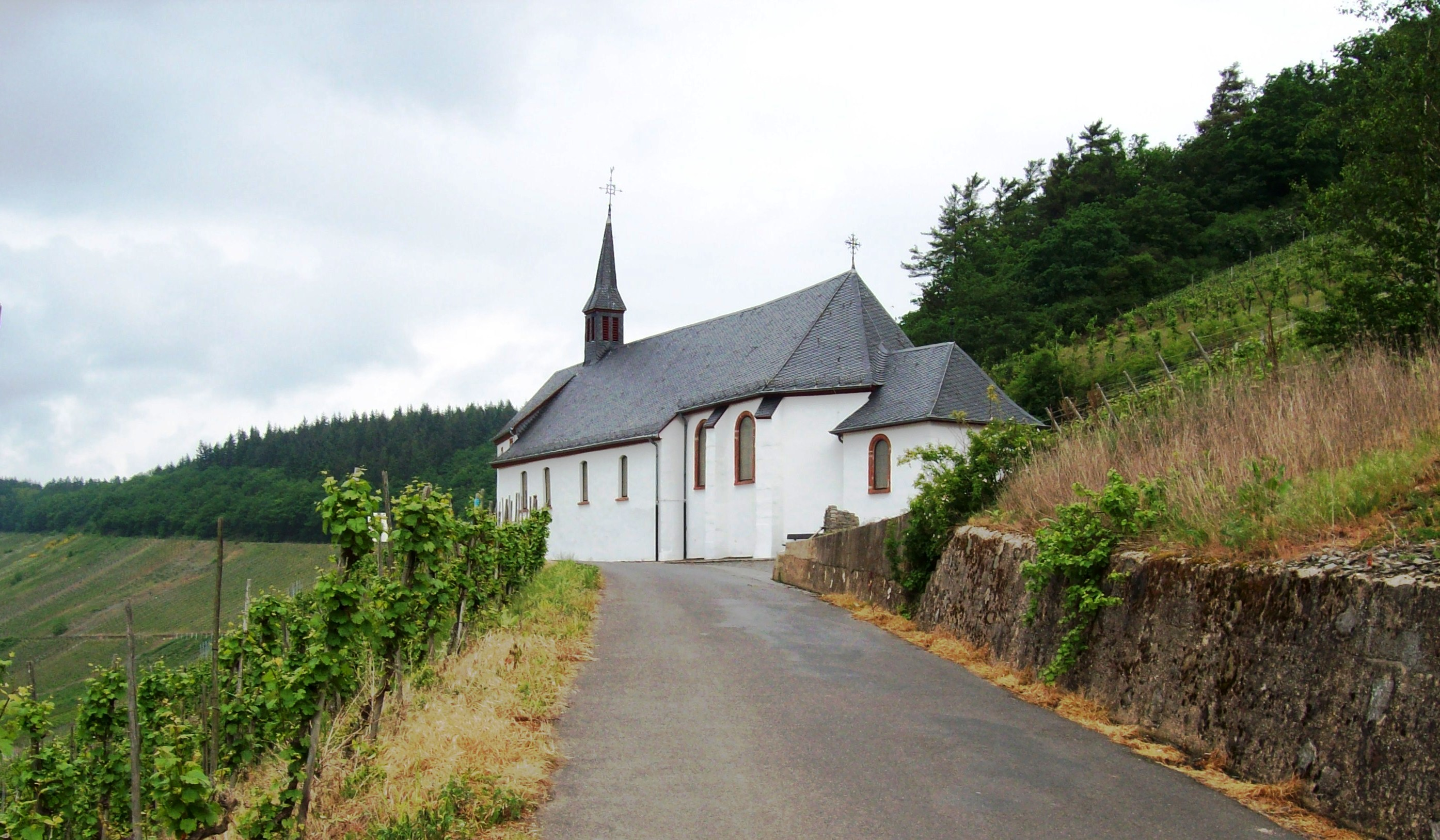
Saint Paul's Church (Paulskirche) among the vineyards

- Saint Peter's Parish Church (Pfarrkirche St. Peter), built in 1782
- Saint Paul's Church (Paulskirche) with a built-in monk's cell on the Paulsberg (built before 1500)
- Schloss Lieser, from the Gründerzeit
- Old Postal Estate, ensemble from the 16th to 18th century
- Various old townsmen's and winemakers’ houses
- Local History and Wine Museum (Heimat- und Weinmuseum Lieser)

== Economy and infrastructure ==
=== Winegrowing ===
With roughly 180 ha of vineyards, Lieser is one of the biggest winegrowing centres on the Moselle.

The best known wine locations (Weinlagen) are:

- Lieserer Schloßberg
- Lieserer Niederberg-Helden
- Lieserer Süßenberg
- Lieserer Rosenlay

The first-named location is part of the winemaking appellation – Großlage – of Kurfürstlay, whereas the other three belong to the appellation of Beerenlay.

=== Tourism ===
Tourists who visit Lieser year after year are offered a broad array of hotels, private rooms and pensions. The visiting season stretches in the main from early April to late October. The tourism industry reaches its highest point in the autumn at the time of the grape harvest. Major yearly festivals are the Rund um den Lieserer Marktplatz street festival on the second weekend in September, the Parish Festival on May Day at Saint Paul's Church, the Weinvision Lieser at which winemakers present the last year's wine, the Peter- und Paulskirmes (kermis) and the Backfischfest (“Baked Fish Festival”) on the last weekend in September.

Near Lieser, the Mosel-Radweg (cycle path) from Trier to Koblenz meets the Maare-Mosel-Radweg coming from Daun.

== Notable people ==
- Karl Ferdinand Becker (1775–1849), philologist
