= Monzelfeld =

- Municipality
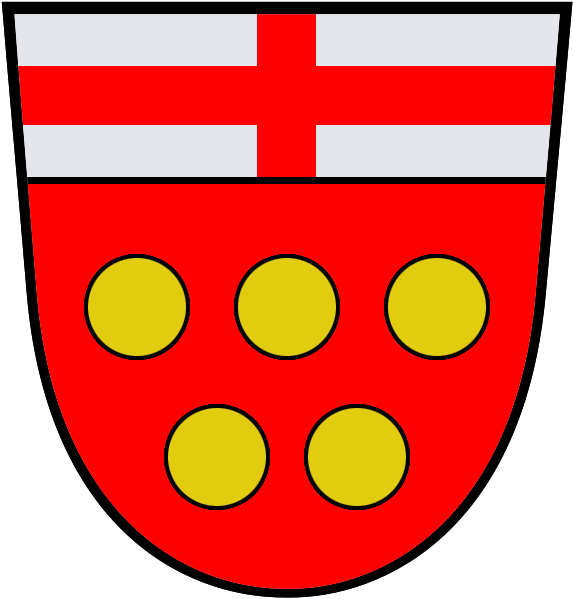
- Coat of arms

- Location of Monzelfeld within Bernkastel-Wittlich district
- Interactive map of Monzelfeld
- Location within Germany Location within Rhineland-Palatinate
- Coordinates: 49°53′29″N 7°4′19″E
- Country: Germany
- State: Rhineland-Palatinate
- District: Bernkastel-Wittlich
- Municipal assoc.: Bernkastel-Kues

Government
  - Mayor (2019–24): Lothar Josten

Area
  - Total: 12.50 km^{2} (4.83 sq mi)
- Elevation: 430 m (1,410 ft)

Population (2025-12-31)
  - Total: 1,324
  - Density: 105.9/km^{2} (274.3/sq mi)
- Time zone: UTC+01:00 (CET)
  - Summer (DST): UTC+02:00 (CEST)
- Postal codes: 54472
- Dialling codes: 06531
- Vehicle registration: WIL
- Website: www.monzelfeld.de

Monzelfeld is an Ortsgemeinde – a municipality belonging to a Verbandsgemeinde, a kind of collective municipality – in the Bernkastel-Wittlich district in Rhineland-Palatinate, Germany.

== Geography ==
=== Location ===
The municipality lies at an elevation of 450 m on the Hunsrück’s south slope some 2 km from the Moselle valley near Bernkastel-Kues. There are 1,340 inhabitants within its area of 12.5 km^{2}. Monzelfeld belongs to the Verbandsgemeinde of Bernkastel-Kues, whose seat is in the like-named town.

=== Neighbouring municipalities ===
Clockwise from the north, these are Bernkastel-Kues, Traben-Trarbach, Longkamp, Morbach-Gonzerath, Morbach-Elzerath, Gornhausen, Veldenz and Mülheim an der Mosel.

=== Constituent communities ===
Monzelfeld has two Ortsteile, the main centre, also called Monzelfeld, and the outlying centre of Annenberg lying in the Hinterbach valley.

== History ==
In 634, Monzelfeld had its first documentary mention as Munzelvelt. A very old transport route once led through the village, witnessing which is the main street’s name, Alte Poststraße (“Old Post Road”).

Supposedly, Johann Wolfgang von Goethe once changed horses in Monzelfeld, as witnessed by an entry in his valet's diary.

== Politics ==
=== Municipal council ===
The council is made up of 16 council members, who were elected by proportional representation at the municipal election held on 7 June 2009, and the honorary mayor as chairman.

The municipal election held on 7 June 2009 yielded the following results:

| Year | Klassen | FBL | Werland | Total |
|---|---|---|---|---|
| 2009 | 7 | 6 | 3 | 16 seats |

=== Coat of arms ===
The municipality's arms might be described thus: Gules five bezants, three and two, in a chief argent a cross of the first.

== Culture and sightseeing ==
=== Clubs ===
Village life is enhanced by several clubs:

- Monzelfeld Volunteer Fire Brigade
- Musikverein „Cäcilia“ Monzelfeld 1926 e.V. (music)
- Heimatverein Monzelfeld 1984 e.V. (local history)
- SV Monzelfeld 1921 e.V. (sport)
- Jugendgruppe „Zum Backes“ Monzelfeld 1981 e.V. (youth group)
- KV „Welle Baie“ 1954 Monzelfeld e.V (Carnival)

=== Sightseeing ===
Monzelfeld is surrounded by hiking trails offering scenic views of the Moselle valley, and the woods of the Hunsrück.

== Economy and infrastructure ==
Formerly characterized by agriculture, Monzelfeld is today mainly a residential community with a great many commuters who shuttle to and from jobs in nearby Bernkastel-Kues and Morbach. In the small outlying centre of Annenberg in the Hinterbach valley, there was once mining, as recalled by a fountain in the village centre.

Monzelfeld has its own kindergarten, a primary school and a Catholic Church (St. Stephanus, or Saint Stephen's).

Lying 24 km away is Frankfurt-Hahn Airport.
