= Erden =

- Municipality
- Location of Erden within Bernkastel-Wittlich district
- Interactive map of Erden
- Location within Germany Location within Rhineland-Palatinate
- Coordinates: 49°58′46″N 7°1′30″E
- Country: Germany
- State: Rhineland-Palatinate
- District: Bernkastel-Wittlich
- Municipal assoc.: Bernkastel-Kues

Government
  - Mayor (2019–24): Annette Schumacher-Menningen

Area
  - Total: 3.69 km^{2} (1.42 sq mi)
- Elevation: 115 m (377 ft)

Population (2025-12-31)
  - Total: 434
  - Density: 118/km^{2} (305/sq mi)
- Time zone: UTC+01:00 (CET)
  - Summer (DST): UTC+02:00 (CEST)
- Postal codes: 54492
- Dialling codes: 06532
- Vehicle registration: WIL
- Website: www.erden.de

Erden (German pronunciation: [ˈeːɐ̯dn̩]) is an Ortsgemeinde – a municipality belonging to a Verbandsgemeinde, a kind of collective municipality – in the Bernkastel-Wittlich district in Rhineland-Palatinate, Germany.

== Geography ==
=== Location ===
Erden lies on the Moselle’s right bank surrounded by vineyards in the great bow in the river between Bernkastel-Kues and Traben-Trarbach, where the valley spreads out into very flat country bordering on the Hunsrück. Over on the opposite bank, steep slopes lead up to the Eifel.

Erden belongs to the Verbandsgemeinde of Bernkastel-Kues, whose seat is in the like-named town.

=== Nearby communities ===
Neighbouring places are Lösnich and Zeltingen-Rachtig, and across the river, Ürzig. The nearest middle centres are Bernkastel-Kues, some 8 km away, as the crow flies, and the district seat, Wittlich, some 10 km away. To Trier it is about 38 km.

=== Climate ===
Erden lies in a transitional zone between temperate oceanic climate and continental climate; compared to other regions in Germany, a very mild and sunny climate prevails here. In nearby Brauneberg on 11 August 1998, a record temperature of 41.2 °C in the shade, the highest ever air temperature recorded in the Federal Republic, was confirmed.

The barrier formed by the Eifel shields Erden from west winds, putting it in a rain shadow and sometimes subjecting it to a föhn effect. At the same time, the warming of the air is favoured by the only slight exchange of air with the surrounding area. Tied in with this is the high humidity due to ongoing evaporation of water from the Moselle, which, especially in summer, makes at times for heavy and muggy weather, and which also brings many storms along with it.

== History ==
=== La Tène and Roman times ===
As early as 500 BC, in La Tène times, the Treveri, a people of mixed Celtic and Germanic stock, settled in Western and Central Europe. Celtic graves bear witness to this. In Roman times, what is now today's municipality might well have been within the territory of the provincial capital, Trier; presumably, as state domain, it was involved in the town's provisioning. Across from Erden were found two ancient winepressing facilities, one of which was Germany's oldest such Roman facility. Onto this in the 4th century AD was built a smokehouse, a so-called fumarium, to age wine more quickly with smoke. This is confirmed by digs done by the Rheinisches Landesmuseum in Trier.

=== Middle Ages ===
In Francia, Erden remained a kingly estate and belonged to the Fiscus of Kröv, which after being transferred from the king's control in the 13th century to the Counts Palatine of the Rhine was pledged, ending up in the hands of the Counts of Sponheim. About 774 or 775, the name Erden appeared for the first time in writing: in pago Muslense super fluvio Muselle in monte Ardinigo, it says in a document from the Abbey of Echternach. “Erden” means “high” or “steep”.

The splintering of the Fiscus of Kröv was parallelled by one in Erden, where in the Early Middle Ages the Bishop of Toul, or rather his Abbey of Saint-Èvre de Toul, acquired extensive holdings. These might well have stemmed from the Pippinids, who had holdings in the Moselle country, and they were sold in 1266 to the Vögte of Hunolstein. In Carolingian times, the Royal Abbey of Echternach appears, provided with holdings in Erden. Following in the High and Late Middle Ages were the Cistercian Himmerod Abbey and other monasteries and foundations, among them Machern Monastery, Springiersbach Monastery, Ören, St. Maximin's Abbey, Ravengiersburg and others.

The Sponheims’ share of the landholdings in Erden was surely the biggest, though the Counts gave parts thereof out as castle fiefs. Sponheim was also the liege lord of the Vögte of Hunolstein, and asserted, through the blood court, hegemony over the Kröver Reich (a kingly estate named for Kröv) until the late 18th century, and then only when the Vögte of Hunolstein sold their holdings to the Archbishopric of Trier. The Faßbodenzoll (“barrel-bottom duty”) in Erden, which might have been an old Fiscus privilege, but which was not witnessed until quite late, and the Mühlenbann (an arrangement giving the lord the exclusive right to own and run mills, and obliging all his subjects to use his mills exclusively) ensured that the Sponheim administration's hold on Erden was fast. Through part of the Hunolsteins’ holdings being further bequeathed within their family until 1786, Erden retained its Ingericht (court), which was independent of the Electorate of Trier. Quite handsome holdings that had come from the Imperial estate were also held by a knightly family that named itself after Erden, but these passed in 1347 to the St. Paulin Foundation in Trier.

Ecclesiastically, Erden's Aperkapelle, a chapel whose founding might have gone back to the Abbey of St. Èvre, belonged to the parish of Lösnich, which by way of the Abbey of Mönchengladbach and the Counts of Sayn fell in the 13th century to the Teutonic Knights. The parish seat was moved in the late 13th century to Rachtig. Saint Èvre's patronage of Erden was by the 17th century forgotten. Since then, Saint Anne has been held to be patron saint. The abolition of church tithes by the French Revolution brought about Erden's shift from membership in the Rachtig parish league and the acquisition of its own pastor.

=== Modern times ===
After the transitional period under the French, which brought along with it the dissolution of the old structures, Erden, and the Kröver Reich, too, passed to the district of Bernkastel in the Regierungsbezirk of Trier, themselves part of Prussia’s Rhine Province. Since 1946, Erden has been part of the then newly founded state of Rhineland-Palatinate.

== Politics ==
The council is made up of 8 council members, who were elected by majority vote at the municipal election held on 7 June 2009, and the honorary mayor as chairman.

== Culture and sightseeing ==
=== Village culture ===
Erden is characterized by winegrowing; even today there are still more than a dozen winemaking businesses. The best known among these is the Erdener Treppchen. A volunteer fire brigade, a parish community and several clubs characterize the village’s cultural life. In a play on the first line in the Bible, Erden, jokingly, likes to call itself the world’s oldest village. “In the beginning God created the heaven and the earth,” reads Genesis 1:1, or as Erdeners like to say in German as “proof” of their village's age: Am Anfang schuf Gott Himmel und Erde[n], “Erde” being German for “earth” in fact. Worth seeing in Erden are the church, various wayside crosses and old winemaking houses, as well as the Roman winepressing facilities across the Moselle.

=== Regular events ===
Local history and wine festivals are regularly held, among which are the Wine and Fountain Festival, the Erden Wine Fair, the Winemakers’, Wine and Street Festival in late summer and the Parish Festival. In June, the Happy Mosel-Erlebnistag (“Adventure Day”) is also held.

== Economy and infrastructure ==
Winegrowing has from days of yore played an important rôle, even if today the great majority of the population earns a living in other fields. In the 20th century, tourism developed. In Erden is a campground of roughly 1.5 ha as well as many businesses and private citizens with rooms to let with several hundred guest beds. Public transport is integrated into the Verkehrsverbund Region Trier (VRT), whose fares therefore apply.

There are plans to build a bridge over the Upper Moselle, very close to Erden, for the Bundesstraße 50.
