= Zeltingen-Rachtig =

- Municipality
- Coat of arms

- Location of Zeltingen-Rachtig within Bernkastel-Wittlich district
- Interactive map of Zeltingen-Rachtig
- Location within Germany Location within Rhineland-Palatinate
- Coordinates: 49°57′26″N 07°00′38″E
- Country: Germany
- State: Rhineland-Palatinate
- District: Bernkastel-Wittlich
- Municipal assoc.: Bernkastel-Kues

Government
  - Mayor (2019–24): Bianca Waters

Area
  - Total: 16.94 km^{2} (6.54 sq mi)
- Elevation: 120 m (390 ft)

Population (2025-12-31)
  - Total: 2,113
  - Density: 124.7/km^{2} (323.1/sq mi)
- Time zone: UTC+01:00 (CET)
  - Summer (DST): UTC+02:00 (CEST)
- Postal codes: 54492, 54539
- Dialling codes: 06532
- Vehicle registration: WIL
- Website: www.zeltingen-rachtig.de

Zeltingen-Rachtig is an Ortsgemeinde – a municipality belonging to a Verbandsgemeinde, a kind of collective municipality – in the Bernkastel-Wittlich district in Rhineland-Palatinate, Germany.

== Geography ==
=== Location ===
The municipality lies surrounded by vineyards in the great bend in the Moselle between Bernkastel-Kues and Traben-Trarbach not far from the university town of Trier. Both Ortsteile – Zeltingen and Rachtig – are found on the river's right bank where the valley broadens out into very flat country bordering on the Hunsrück. Zeltingen-Rachtig belongs to the Verbandsgemeinde of Bernkastel-Kues, whose seat is in the like-named town.

=== Nearby municipalities ===
Neighbouring municipalities are, among others, Erden, Ürzig and Graach an der Mosel. The nearest middle centres are Bernkastel-Kues, some 5 km away, and Wittlich, some 15 km away. Trier lies some 45 km away.

=== Climate ===
Zeltingen-Rachtig lies in a transitional zone between temperate oceanic climate and continental climate; compared to other regions in Germany, a very warm and sunny climate prevails here. In nearby Brauneberg on 11 August 1998, a record temperature of 41.2 °C in the shade, the highest ever air temperature recorded in the Federal Republic, was confirmed.

The barrier formed by the Eifel shields the double municipality from west winds, putting it in a rain shadow and sometimes subjecting it to a föhn effect. At the same time, the warming of the air is favoured by the only slight exchange of air with the surrounding area. Tied in with this is the high humidity due to ongoing evaporation of water from the Moselle, which, especially in summer, makes at times for heavy and muggy weather, and which also brings many storms along with it.

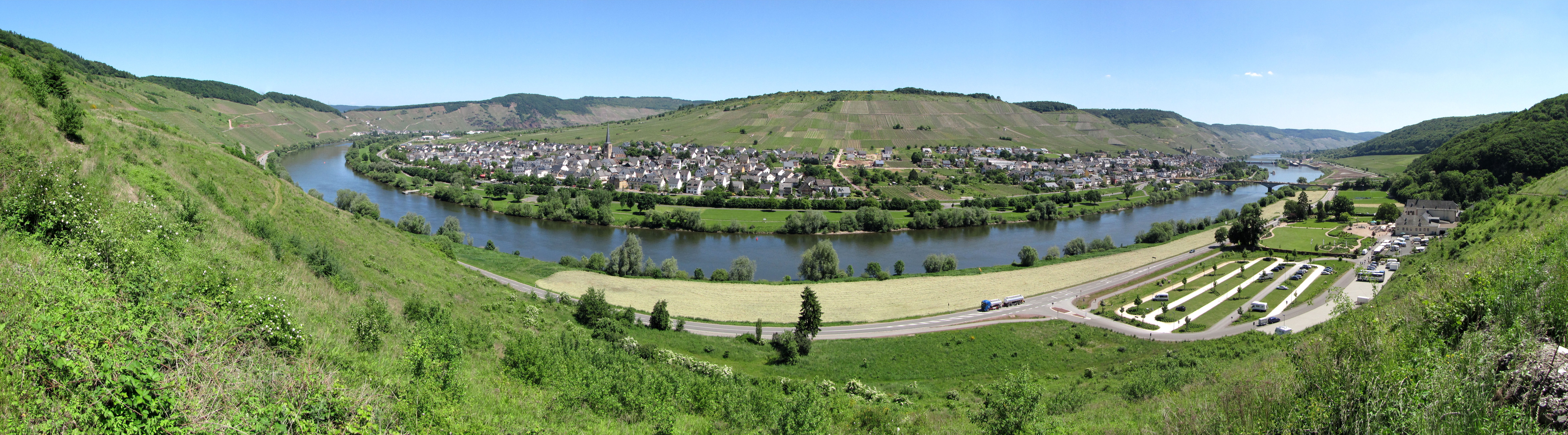
Panorama: on the left, Rachtig; on the right, Zeltingen.

Aerial view of the Moselle in Zeltingen-Rachtig

== History ==
Remnants of human settlements near Bernkastel-Kues date from the time of the Linear Pottery culture, about 3000 BC. As early as 500 BC, the Treveri, a people of mixed Celtic and Germanic stock, from whom the Latin name for the city of Trier, Augusta Treverorum, is also derived, settled in the region around Zeltingen-Rachtig. Celtanc and Raptacum are the oldest names for today's Zeltingen-Rachtig that have been handed down; they document its Celtic beginnings. Until the 19th century, the double municipality was an enclave of the Archbishopric of Cologne. Cunibert of Cologne, who was once the Archbishop, was descended from the Moselle-Franconian nobility. The local lore has it that he was born at a castle near Zeltingen.

== Politics ==
=== Municipal council ===
The council is made up of 16 council members, who were elected by proportional representation at the municipal election held on 7 June 2009, and the honorary mayor as chairman.

The municipal election held on 7 June 2009 yielded the following results:

	CDU	FWG	BGL	Total
2009	5	4	7	16 seats

=== Coat of arms ===
The municipality's arms might be described thus: Per pale gules two keys per saltire, the wards to chief and the one in bend surmounting the other Or, and argent a cross sable.

The municipality's oldest known seal, from the late 14th century, already bears these charges, and both refer to the former landholder, the Electorate of Cologne, whose arms are seen on the sinister (armsbearer's left, viewer's right) side. The keys on the dexter (armsbearer's right, viewer's left) side refer to Saint Peter, who was Cologne's patron saint.

After having been in use for centuries, the arms were officially granted in 1936.

=== Town partnerships ===
Zeltingen-Rachtig fosters partnerships with the following places:

- Saint-Florentin, Yonne, France since 1966

== Culture and sightseeing ==
=== Village culture ===
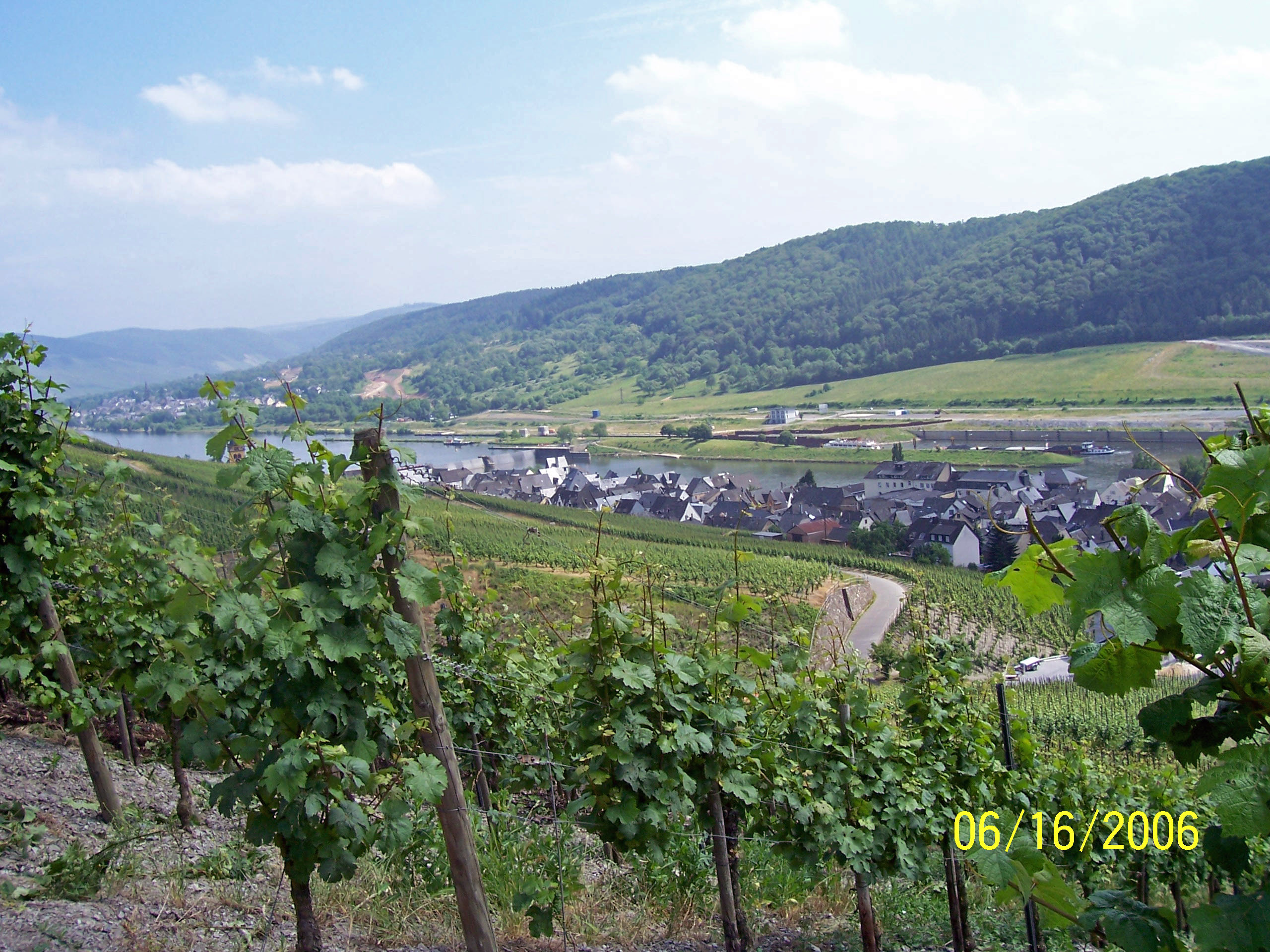
Zeltingen vineyards

With 133 ha of vineyards, the double municipality is among the biggest winegrowing centres on the Middle Moselle. One well known vineyard is the Zeltinger Sonnenuhr (“Sundial”) at the Bernkasteler Ring winemakers’ association's wine auction in September 2006, a 2002 Trockenbeerenauslese from this vineyard fetched a record price for one bottle of €2,100. Other vineyards are Zeltinger Himmelreich (“Heaven Empire”), Zeltinger Schloßberg (“Castle Mountain”) and Zeltinger Deutschherrenberg (“German Lords’ Mountain”). Several wineries, which grow mainly Riesling, still exist today. Furthermore, there is a cultural path in the form of the Mosel.Erlebnis.Route, which stretches on for 7 km and gives information about the municipality's history, winegrowing and culture. It leads through both centres and through several vineyards. Inge Schwaab, the 1963/1964 German Wine Queen, comes from Zeltingen-Rachtig.

Volunteer fire brigades, parish communities and several clubs characterize village cultural life in Zeltingen-Rachtig. In the Zeltingen Rowing Association (Rudergesellschaft Zeltingen), which counts two world champions in lightweight fours without coxswain and an Olympian among its members, there is an active rowing club.

=== Regular events ===
Local history and wine festivals are regularly held. Highlights are the Street Wine Festival (Weinstraßenfest) and the Wine Fair (Weinkirmes) in Rachtig, as well as the Days of the Open Wine Cellars (Tage der offenen Weinkeller), the Wine and Street Festival (Wein- und Straßenfest) and the Wine Fair, each held in Zeltingen. Further concerts, practice of customs, dancing evenings and other public festivals are regularly staged. The operetta Zeltinger Himmelreich is produced every other year by more than 100 amateur performers on Zeltingen's old marketplace; active in this are mainly members of the local clubs. In nearby Bernkastel-Kues, the Großes Weinfest der Mittelmosel (“Great Wine Festival of the Middle Moselle”) is held each year in late summer, and the Zeltingen-Rachtig winemakers have their own booth there. Also, in Wittlich, there is the Säubrennerkirmes (“Sow Burner Fair”); it is one of Rhineland-Palatinate's biggest folk festivals and was begun in 1951, based on the mediaeval Säubrennersage (a legend that tells of a sow that inadvertently allowed a siege force to enter Wittlich, sack it and burn it down after she ate the turnip that the gatekeeper had used instead of the bolt, which he could not find; all swine in the town were accordingly punished with burning – meaning, in effect, a huge pork barbecue). Both events are among the Trier Region's biggest folk festivals.

== Economy and infrastructure ==
Winegrowing and tourism play an important rôle. A local supply of food is guaranteed: a bakery, a grocer's shop, medical practices, several inns, a post office and a bank branch can all be found in the municipality. Zeltingen-Rachtig also has at its disposal two kindergartens, a special school, a campground, a miniature golf course, parklands along the Moselle and a sporting ground. The municipality has several hotels, restaurants and many commercial and private lodging providers with roughly 1,000 guest beds.

=== Transport ===
Near Zeltingen-Rachtig is a weir on the Moselle with a lock. Opened on 21 November 2019 for Bundesstraße 50, right near Zeltingen-Rachtig, is the Hochmoselbrücke as part of the Hochmoselübergang – a highway link between Belgian and Dutch harbors and the Frankfurt area. Public transport is integrated into the Verkehrsverbund Region Trier (VRT), whose fares therefore apply.

== Famous people ==
From Zeltingen came the baritone and director Franz Porten, whose daughters Rosa and Henny Porten were early filmstars.

In Zeltingen, the brothers Jost and Matthias Schömann-Finck grew up. In August 2009, the then 26- and 30-year-olds, together with the Jochen twins and Martin Kühner from Saarbrücken, became rowing world champions in lightweight fours.

Stephan Ehses (b. 9 December 1855 in Zeltingen as a winemaker's son; d. 19 January 1926 in Rome) was a Catholic church historian.

== Gallery ==
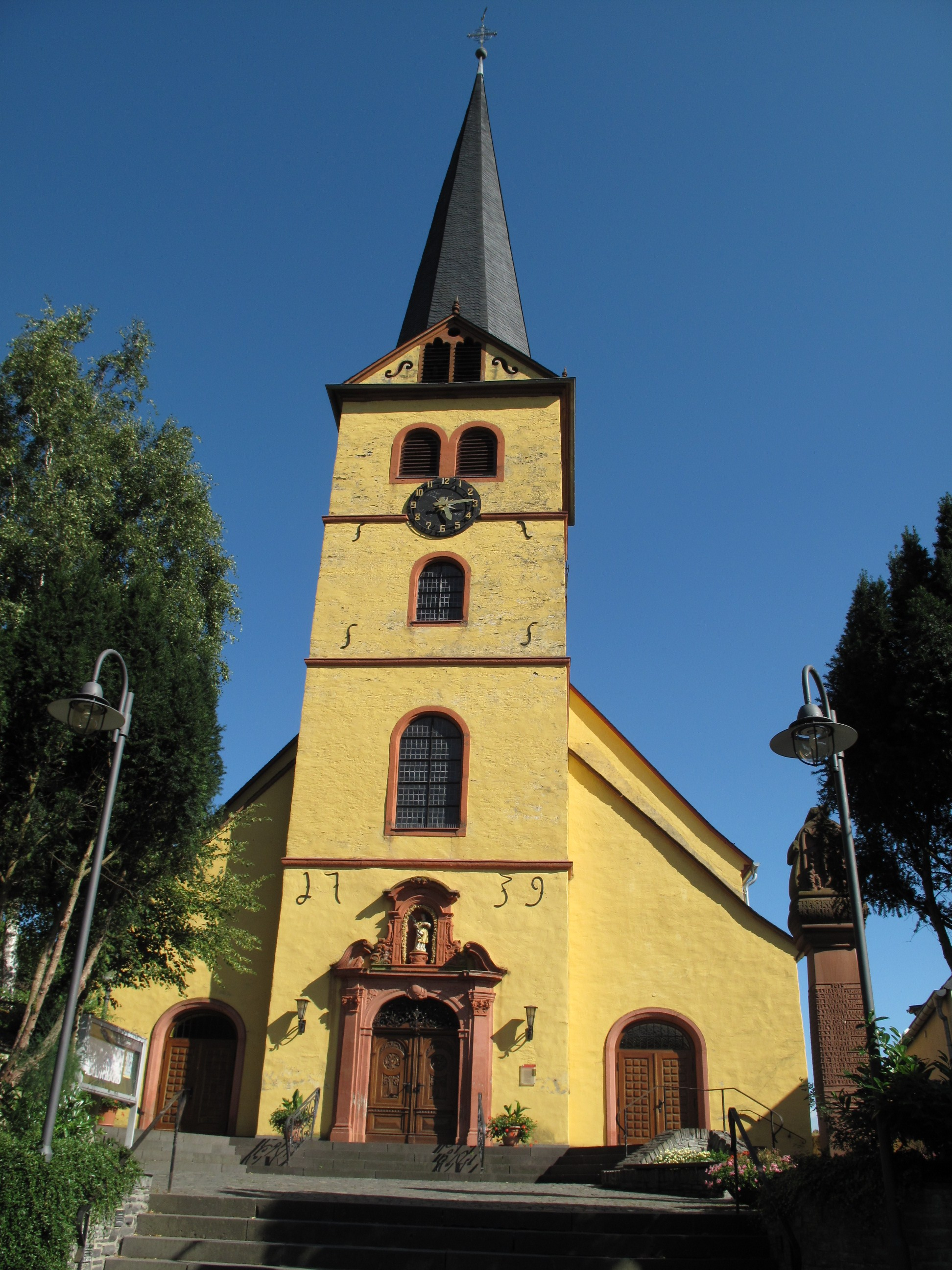
Zeltingen, church

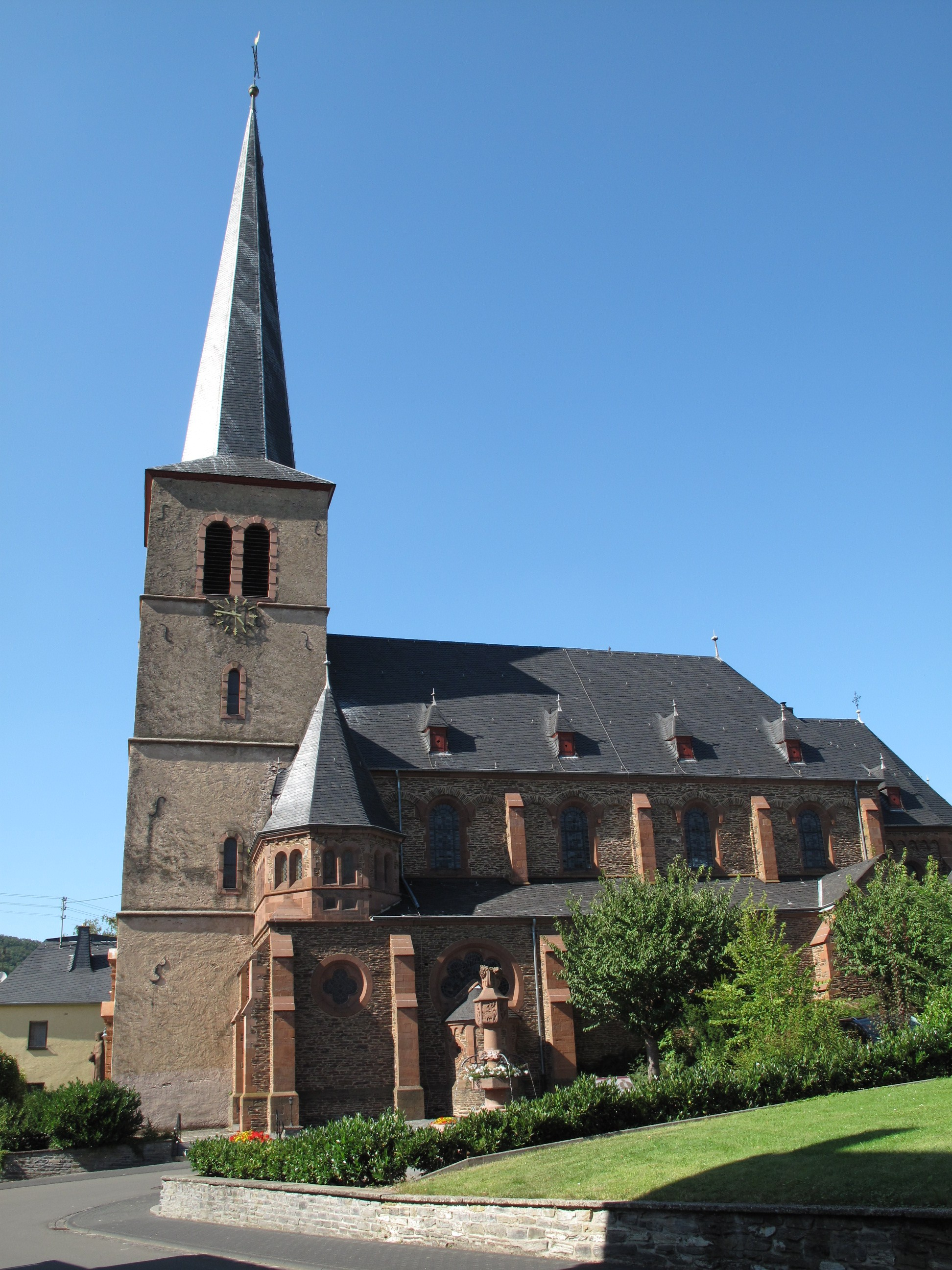
Rachtig, church
