= Gornhausen =

- Municipality
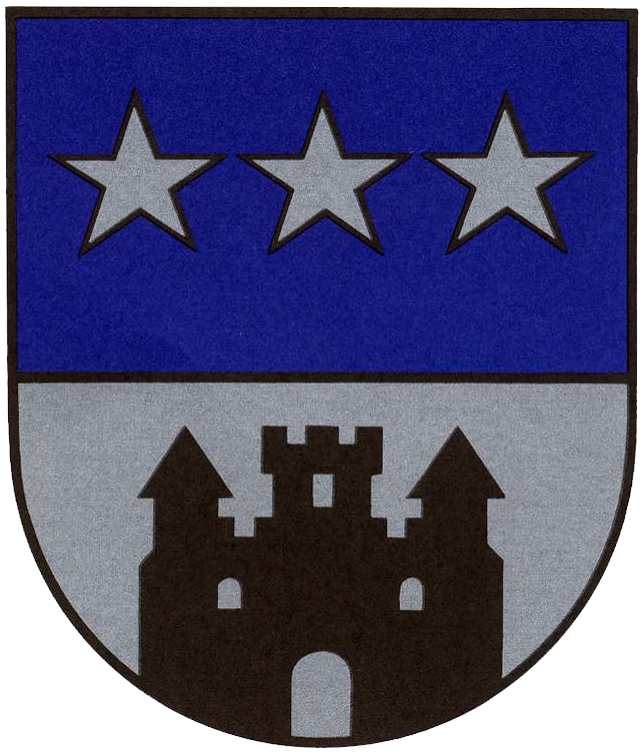
- Coat of arms

- Location of Gornhausen within Bernkastel-Wittlich district
- Interactive map of Gornhausen
- Location within Germany Location within Rhineland-Palatinate
- Coordinates: 49°51′38″N 07°02′46″E
- Country: Germany
- State: Rhineland-Palatinate
- District: Bernkastel-Wittlich
- Municipal assoc.: Bernkastel-Kues

Government
  - Mayor (2019–24): Stefan Wagner

Area
  - Total: 5.30 km^{2} (2.05 sq mi)
- Elevation: 490 m (1,610 ft)

Population (2025-12-31)
  - Total: 203
  - Density: 38.3/km^{2} (99.2/sq mi)
- Time zone: UTC+01:00 (CET)
  - Summer (DST): UTC+02:00 (CEST)
- Postal codes: 54472
- Dialling codes: 06531
- Vehicle registration: WIL
- Website: www.gornhausen.de

Gornhausen is an Ortsgemeinde – a municipality belonging to a Verbandsgemeinde, a kind of collective municipality – in the Bernkastel-Wittlich district in Rhineland-Palatinate, Germany.

== Geography ==
=== Location ===
The municipality lies at the foot of the Haardtkopf (658 m above sea level) in the Hunsrück. The municipal area is 63.2% wooded. The nearest middle centre is Bernkastel-Kues; the nearest upper centre is Trier. Gornhausen belongs to the Verbandsgemeinde of Bernkastel-Kues, whose seat is in the like-named town.

=== Neighbouring municipalities ===
Among the neighbouring municipalities are Veldenz, Burgen, Morbach-Elzerath and Brauneberg-Hirzlei.

=== Climate ===
Yearly precipitation in Gornhausen amounts to 869 mm, which is rather high, falling into the highest third of the precipitation chart for all Germany. At 74% of the German Weather Service's weather stations, lower figures are recorded. The driest month is February. The most rainfall comes in June. In that month, precipitation is 1.3 times what it is in February. Precipitation varies minimally and is very evenly spread throughout the year. At only 1% of the weather stations are lower seasonal swings recorded.

== History ==
Gornhausen belonged, along with the seat, Veldenz, and the villages of Burgen, Mülheim, Brauneberg and Andel (today an outlying centre of Bernkastel-Kues) to the County of Veldenz.

== Politics ==
=== Municipal council ===
The council is made up of 6 council members, who were elected by majority vote at the municipal election held on 7 June 2009, and the honorary mayor as chairman.

=== Coat of arms ===
The municipality's arms might be described thus: Per fess azure three mullets in fess argent and argent a castle emerging from base with a central tower embattled and two side towers with conical roofs sable, the windows and gateway of the field.

== Culture and sightseeing ==
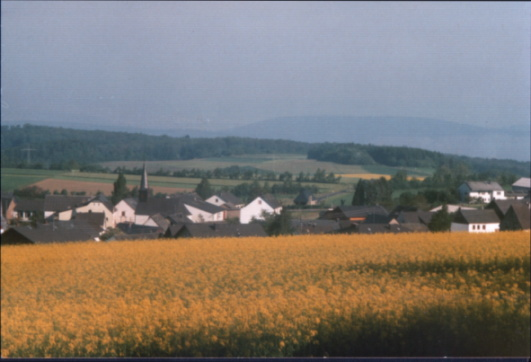
View over Gornhausen

Sightseeing opportunities in Gornhausen include a 300-year-old oak tree, an old mill (Klaramühle), the Berbelay (crags with a good view), the Haardtkopf Transmitter, and a view into the Eifel and Moselle region around Bernkastel-Kues.

=== Regular events ===
In summer, mostly in early August, Gornhausen is, together with the other municipalities in the former County of Veldenz, the host of the ADAC Deutschlandrallye.

== Transmitter on the Haardtkopf ==
Since 1952, there has been on the Haardtkopf a 186 m-tall transmitter, the Haardtkopf Transmitter (Sender Haardtkopf).
