= Mülheim an der Mosel =

- Municipality
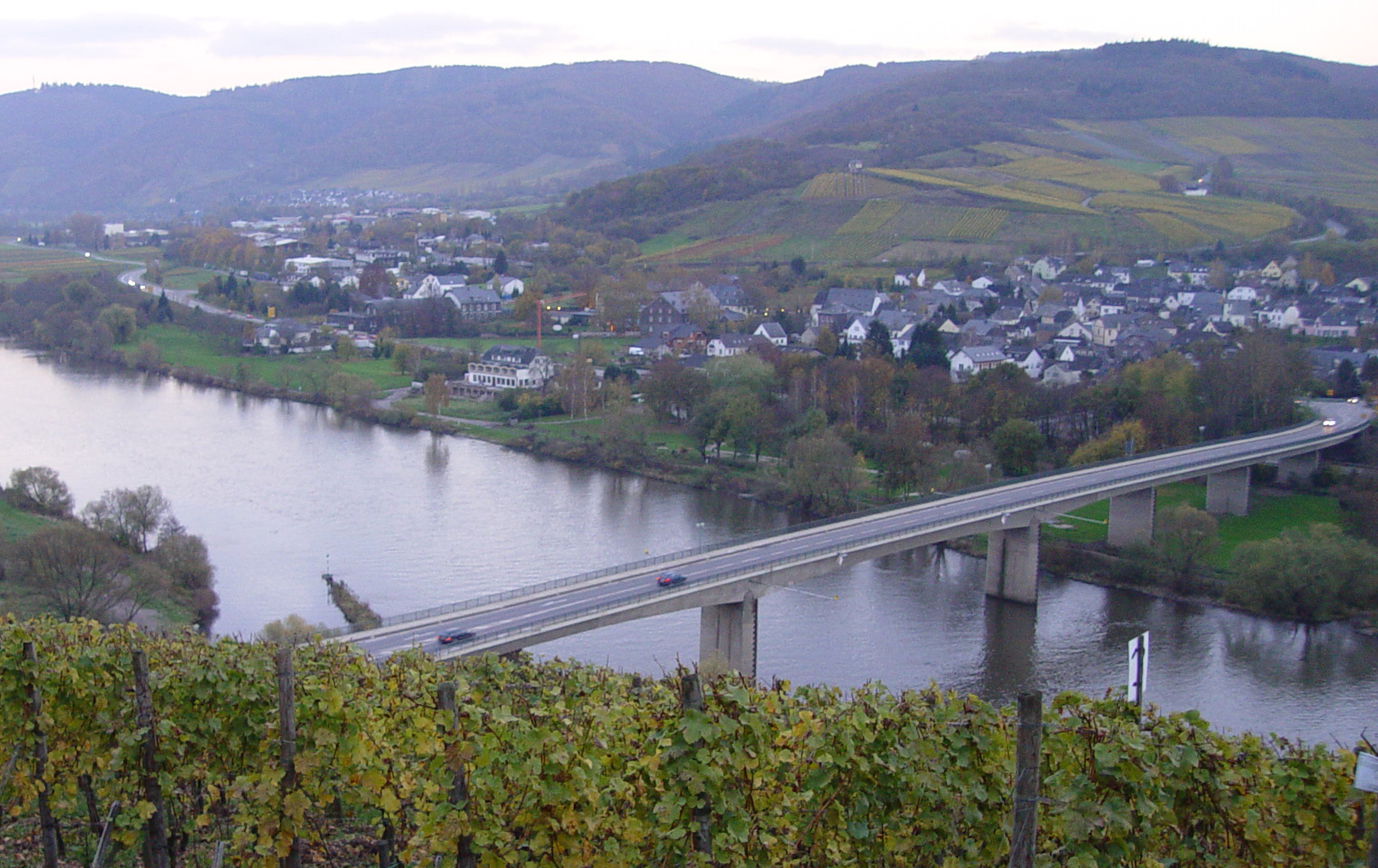
- View of Mülheim

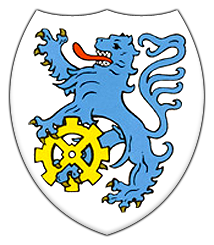
- Coat of arms

- Location of Mülheim an der Mosel within Bernkastel-Wittlich district
- Interactive map of Mülheim an der Mosel
- Location within Germany Location within Rhineland-Palatinate
- Coordinates: 49°54′41″N 7°00′36″E
- Country: Germany
- State: Rhineland-Palatinate
- District: Bernkastel-Wittlich
- Municipal assoc.: Bernkastel-Kues

Government
  - Mayor (2019–24): Friedhelm Leimbrock

Area
  - Total: 4.92 km^{2} (1.90 sq mi)
- Elevation: 119 m (390 ft)

Population (2025-12-31)
  - Total: 936
  - Density: 190/km^{2} (493/sq mi)
- Time zone: UTC+01:00 (CET)
  - Summer (DST): UTC+02:00 (CEST)
- Postal codes: 54486
- Dialling codes: 06534
- Vehicle registration: WIL
- Website: www.muelheimmosel.de

Mülheim an der Mosel (German pronunciation: [ˈmyːlhaɪm ʔan deːɐ̯ ˈmoːzl̩], lit. 'Mülheim on the Moselle') is an Ortsgemeinde – a municipality belonging to a Verbandsgemeinde, a kind of collective municipality – in the Bernkastel-Wittlich district in Rhineland-Palatinate, Germany.

== Geography ==
=== Location ===
The municipality lies surrounded by vineyards, meadows and forests in the natural and cultivated landscape of the Moselle valley not far from the university city of Trier. Mülheim is found on the river’s right bank, where the valley begins to broaden out into country marked by even slopes on the banks and by former riverbeds. The village lies at the foot of a small, narrow mountain, a former river island surrounded by an old riverbed of the Moselle that has now been cut off from the mainstream. This is planted all round with grapevines and is purportedly the only mountain in Europe wholly given over to winegrowing.

Mülheim belongs to the Verbandsgemeinde of Bernkastel-Kues, whose seat is in the like-named town.

=== Nearby municipalities ===
Neighbouring municipalities are, among others, Brauneberg and Lieser. The nearest middle centres are the double town of Bernkastel-Kues, some 4 km away, and the district seat, Wittlich, some 12 km away. Trier is some 33 km away.

=== Climate ===
Mülheim lies in a transitional zone between temperate oceanic climate and continental climate; compared to other regions in Germany, a very warm and sunny climate prevails here. In neighbouring Brauneberg on 11 August 1998, a record temperature of 41.2 °C in the shade, the highest ever air temperature recorded in the Federal Republic, was confirmed at the Meteomedia weather station by Jörg Kachelmann (however, Brauneberg is not said to be Germany’s number-one hotspot because the weather station is not included in official measurements owing to its location on a slate mountain).

The barrier formed by the Eifel shields Mülheim from west winds, putting it in a rain shadow and sometimes subjecting it to a föhn effect. At the same time, the warming of the air is favoured by the only slight exchange of air with the surrounding area. Tied in with this is the high humidity due to ongoing evaporation of water from the Moselle, which, especially in summer, makes at times for heavy and muggy weather, and which also brings many storms along with it.

== History ==
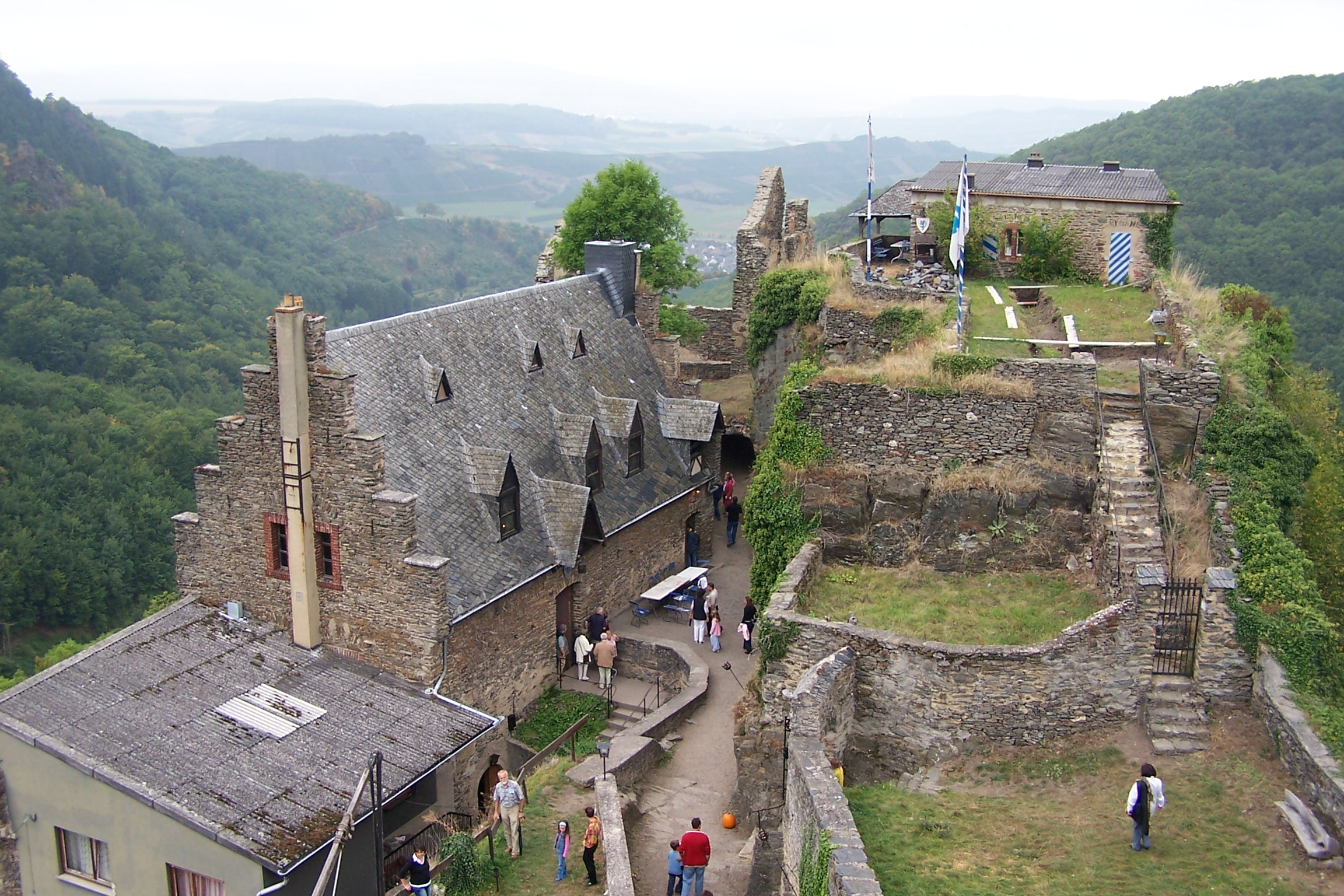
Schloss Veldenz, a few kilometres from Mülheim

In nearby areas, remnants of human habitation have been found from the Bronze Age, as have the ruins of a flight castle, the Heidenmauer (“Heathen Wall”), which is found a few kilometres away from Mülheim, behind Schloss Veldenz. As early as about 500 BC there came settlement by the Treveri, a people of mixed Celtic and Germanic stock, from whom the Latin name for the city of Trier, Augusta Treverorum, is also derived. From about 50 BC until sometime about AD 500 came the Romans. After the collapse of Roman hegemony, the area around Mülheim was taken over by the Salian Franks, which their king, Childebert II, eventually donated to Bishop Agericus of Verdun. Episcopally installed princes from the Nahegau made themselves ever more independent and beginning in 1129 bore the title Count. Thereafter, Mülheim was part of the County of Veldenz, although after both the first and second comital families had died out, the County passed in 1444 to Stephen, Count Palatine of Simmern-Zweibrücken, and eventually in 1694 through inheritance to Electoral Palatinate. In 1752 in Burgen, not far away, the notorious robber, Johann Peter Petri, known as “Schwarzer Peter” (“Black Peter”), the outlaw Schinderhannes’s henchman, was born. Until 1795, Mülheim belonged to Bavaria.

== Politics ==
=== Municipal council ===
The council is made up of 16 council members, who were elected at the municipal election held on 7 June 2009, and the honorary mayor as chairman.

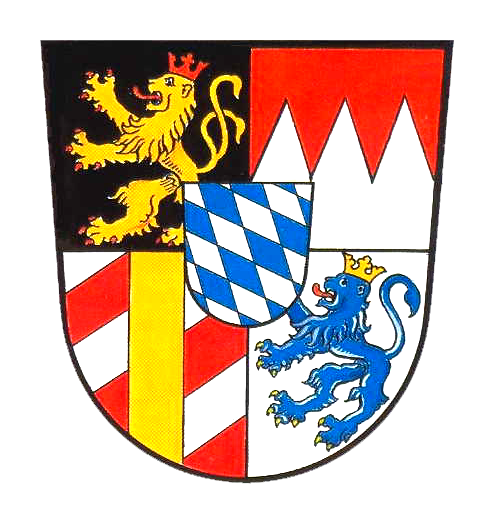
Bavarian coat of arms from 1835 with the Lion of Veldenz. It also depicts: the Palatine Lion, the Franconian Rake and the Margraviate of Burgau as well as the Bavarian lozenges in the inescutcheon. These arms held their place until the end of the monarchy.

The municipal election held on 7 June 2009 yielded the following results:

Year	Bottler	Falke	Fehres	Total
2009	7	5	4	16 seats

=== Coat of arms ===
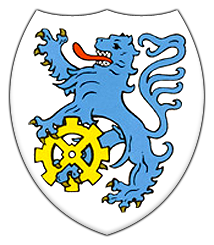
Coat of arms of Mülheim

The municipality’s arms might be described thus: Argent a lion rampant azure armed Or and langued gules holding between his sinister fore gambe and dexter hind gambe a waterwheel of the third.

The two charges in the arms are the blue ("azure") Lion of Veldenz with a red tongue ("langued gules") and gold claws ("armed Or"), along with a special municipal symbol, the golden waterwheel. The tinctures gules and Or (red and gold) were taken from the heraldic beast on the helm of the arms borne by the old County of Veldenz. In 1835, the lion in Mülheim's arms was adopted by the King of Bavaria into that kingdom’s state coat of arms, where it remained as a charge until the end of the First World War when the last Bavarian king, Ludwig III was forced to abdicate as a result of the November Revolution.

== Culture and sightseeing ==
=== Regular events ===
Local history and wine festivals are held regularly in Mülheim. The highlight is the Mülheimer Markt, a market and court day established by the Counts in 1555, today a wine festival marked with a parade, market stalls and a midway. The Mülheimer Markt is not held on a weekend, but rather each year between the first Tuesday and Thursday in August. Nevertheless, it is in no way inferior to other wine festivals in the Verbandsgemeinde of Bernkastel-Kues and draws a good number of visitors.

== Economy and infrastructure ==
Winegrowing and also tourism play an important rôle. A local supply of food is guaranteed. The winemaking village also has a landing stage from which boat tours are available. Moreover, several “First-Class Hotels” (that is, four-star, under the German hotel classification system) have arisen in Mülheim to meet the high demand. Public transport is integrated into the Verkehrsverbund Region Trier (VRT), whose fares therefore apply, and which also includes, besides Trier, the districts of Bernkastel-Wittlich, Bitburg-Prüm, Vulkaneifel and Trier-Saarburg.
