= Maring-Noviand =

- Municipality
- Location of Maring-Noviand within Bernkastel-Wittlich district
- Interactive map of Maring-Noviand
- Location within Germany Location within Rhineland-Palatinate
- Coordinates: 49°55′42″N 6°59′52″E
- Country: Germany
- State: Rhineland-Palatinate
- District: Bernkastel-Wittlich
- Municipal assoc.: Bernkastel-Kues

Government
  - Mayor (2019–24): Klaus Becker

Area
  - Total: 12.23 km^{2} (4.72 sq mi)
- Elevation: 134 m (440 ft)

Population (2025-12-31)
  - Total: 1,354
  - Density: 110.7/km^{2} (286.7/sq mi)
- Time zone: UTC+01:00 (CET)
  - Summer (DST): UTC+02:00 (CEST)
- Postal codes: 54484
- Dialling codes: 06535
- Vehicle registration: WIL
- Website: Maring-Noviand.de

Maring-Noviand is an Ortsgemeinde – a municipality belonging to a Verbandsgemeinde, a kind of collective municipality – in the Bernkastel-Wittlich district in Rhineland-Palatinate, Germany.

== Geography ==
=== Location ===
The municipality lies surrounded by vineyards, meadows and forests in the natural and cultivated landscape of the Moselle valley in the Trier region. Maring-Noviand is found in an old river valley now no longer followed by the Moselle, but which formed at a time when the river had not yet settled on the bed over which it flows today (which is 2 km from the village centre). The nearest middle centres are the double town of Bernkastel-Kues and the district seat, Wittlich. The university city of Trier lies roughly 33 km away as the crow flies.

Maring-Noviand belongs to the Verbandsgemeinde of Bernkastel-Kues, whose seat is in the like-named town.

=== Climate ===
Maring-Noviand lies in a transitional zone between temperate oceanic climate and continental climate; compared to other regions in Germany, a very mild climate prevails here. In nearby Brauneberg on 11 August 1998, a record temperature of 41.2 °C in the shade, the highest ever air temperature recorded in the Federal Republic, was confirmed. High humidity due to ongoing evaporation of water from the Moselle makes at times for heavy and muggy weather, especially in summer, and also brings many storms along with it.

== Politics ==
=== Municipal council ===
The council is made up of 16 council members, who were elected by proportional representation at the municipal election held on 7 June 2009, and the honorary mayor as chairman. The municipal election held on 7 June 2009 yielded the following results:

Year	Zukunft e.V.	VBL M-N e.V.	Brixius	Total
2009	8	4	4	16 seats

=== Coat of arms ===
The municipality's arms might be described thus: Per pale argent a cross gules and sable two annulets in pale embraced Or.

== Culture and sightseeing ==
=== Regular events ===
Local history and wine festivals are regularly held.

On the first weekend of every August, the great wine and street festival is held in the constituent community of Maring, drawing hundreds of visitors each year.

== Economy and infrastructure ==
Maring-Noviand is characterized by winegrowing and tourism. Wine locations include, among others, Honigberg, Sonnenuhr, Klosterberg, Lambertuslay and Römerpfad. Raised here are Riesling and Pinot varieties.
