= Kleinich =

- Municipality
- Coat of arms

- Location of Kleinich within Bernkastel-Wittlich district
- Interactive map of Kleinich
- Location within Germany Location within Rhineland-Palatinate
- Coordinates: 49°53′34.12″N 7°11′9.85″E
- Country: Germany
- State: Rhineland-Palatinate
- District: Bernkastel-Wittlich
- Municipal assoc.: Bernkastel-Kues

Government
  - Mayor (2019–24): Arno Wilhelm

Area
  - Total: 20.31 km^{2} (7.84 sq mi)
- Elevation: 450 m (1,480 ft)

Population (2025-12-31)
  - Total: 678
  - Density: 33.4/km^{2} (86.5/sq mi)
- Time zone: UTC+01:00 (CET)
  - Summer (DST): UTC+02:00 (CEST)
- Postal codes: 54483
- Dialling codes: 06536
- Vehicle registration: WIL
- Website: www.kleinich.de

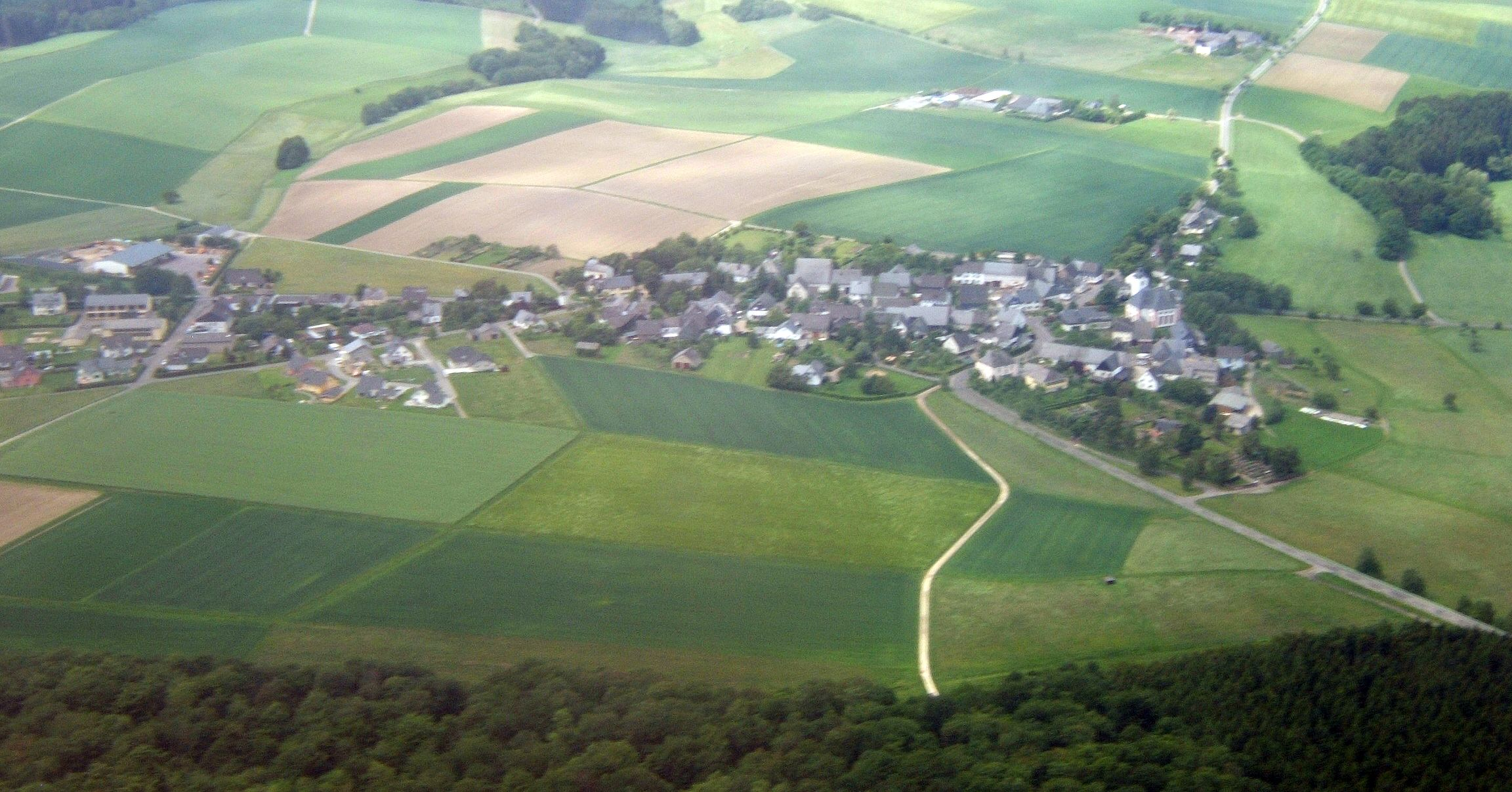
Kleinich from the air

Kleinich (German pronunciation: [ˈklaɪnɪç]) is an Ortsgemeinde – a municipality belonging to a Verbandsgemeinde, a kind of collective municipality – in the Bernkastel-Wittlich district in Rhineland-Palatinate, Germany.

== Geography ==
=== Location ===
The municipality lies in the Hunsrück between the Hunsrückhöhenstraße (“Hunsrück Heights Road”, a scenic road across the Hunsrück built originally as a military road on Hermann Göring’s orders) and the Middle Moselle. The nearest middle centres are Bernkastel-Kues and Morbach. Frankfurt-Hahn Airport lies only a few kilometres to the east. Kleinich belongs to the Verbandsgemeinde of Bernkastel-Kues, whose seat is in the like-named town.

=== Constituent communities ===
Kleinich’s Ortsteile are Kleinich, Oberkleinich, Thalkleinich, Fronhofen, Götzeroth, Emmeroth, Pilmeroth and Ilsbach.

== History ==
In 1220, Kleinich had its first documentary mention. Together with the surrounding hamlets, it was part of the County of Sponheim.

On 15 May 1936, the name was changed from Cleinich to Kleinich. Until municipal administrative reform in Rhineland-Palatinate in 1969, the village belonged to the Bernkastel district, whose seat was at Bernkastel-Kues. On 7 June 1969, the municipality of Kleinich was newly founded out of the dissolved municipalities of Kleinich and Thalkleinich. Today’s municipality arose from a merger of the dissolved municipalities of Kleinich, Emmeroth, Fronhofen, Götzeroth, Ilsbach, Oberkleinich and Pilmeroth on 17 March 1974.

Today, Kleinich is part of the Verbandsgemeinde of Bernkastel-Kues. In 1996, Kleinich reached second place in Rhineland-Palatinate in the contest Unser Dorf soll schöner werden (“Our village should become lovelier”).

=== Population development ===
| 1933 | 1939 | 13 Sep. 1950 | 31 Dec. 1970 | 31 Dec. 1990 | 30 Jun. 2005 | 31 Dec. 2007 |
| 225 | 214 | 889 | 779 | 686 | 732 | 699 |

== Politics ==
The municipal council is made up of 12 council members, who were elected at the municipal election held on 7 June 2009, and the honorary mayor as chairman. The 2004 election was not determined by proportional representation; the council members were elected by majority vote.

The municipal election held on 7 June 2009 yielded the following results:

| Year | WG Born | WG Molz | Total |
|---|---|---|---|
| 2009 | 7 | 5 | 12 seats |

The Ortsteile have elected advisory bodies (Ortsbeiräte) and each has a head (Ortsvorsteher). For these purposes, the Ortsteile of Götzeroth and Ilsbach are counted as one.

== Other sources ==
- Population figures at verwaltungsgeschichte.de
- Population figures in Amtliches Gemeindeverzeichnis Rheinland-Pfalz 2006 (PDF file; 2.03 MB)
