= Kesten (municipality) =

- Municipality
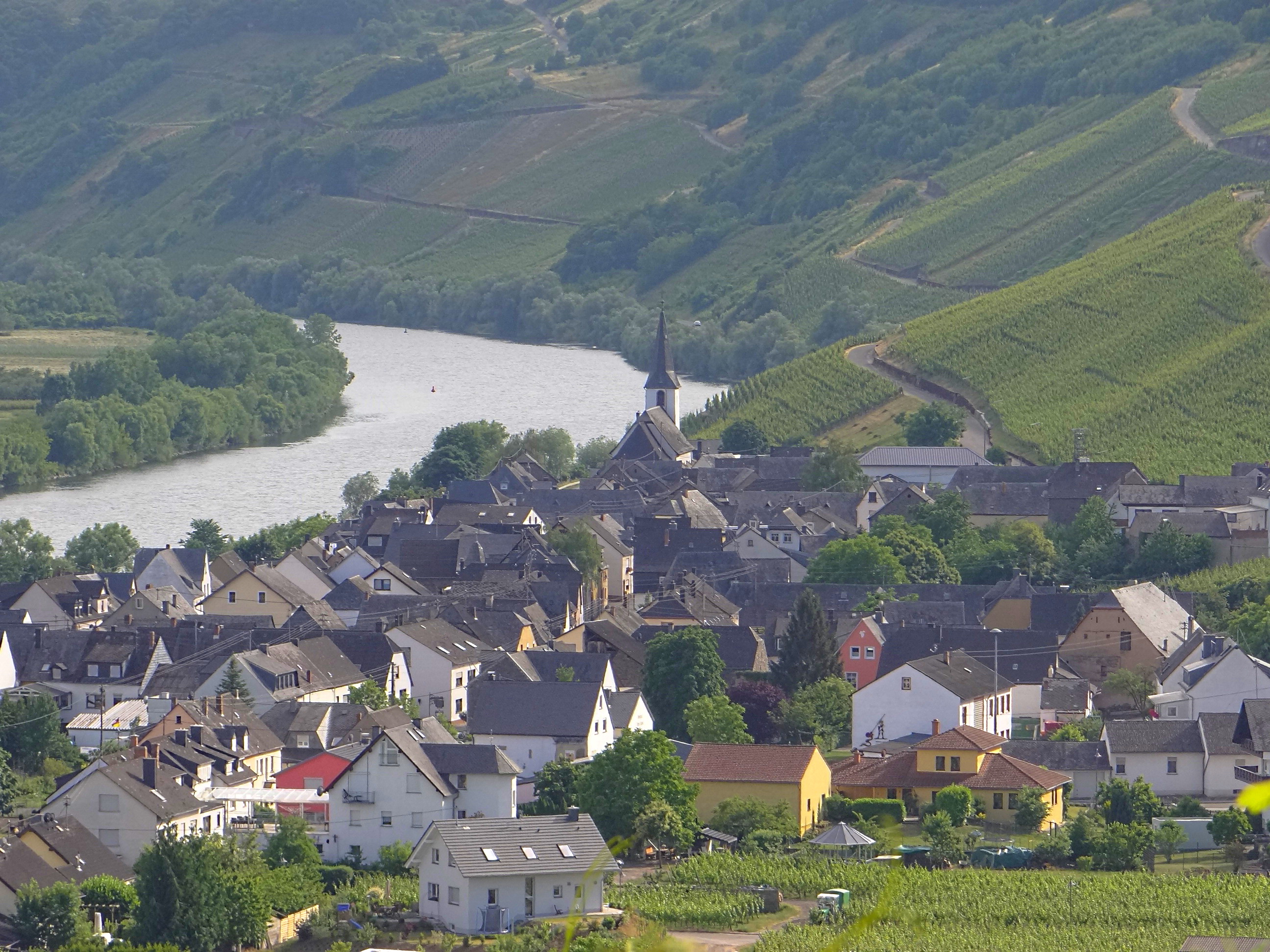

- Coat of arms

- Location of Kesten within Bernkastel-Wittlich district
- Interactive map of Kesten
- Location within Germany Location within Rhineland-Palatinate
- Coordinates: 49°54′N 6°57′E
- Country: Germany
- State: Rhineland-Palatinate
- District: Bernkastel-Wittlich
- Municipal assoc.: Bernkastel-Kues
- Subdivisions: 2

Government
  - Mayor (2019–24): Michael Beer

Area
  - Total: 3.8 km^{2} (1.5 sq mi)
- Elevation: 114 m (374 ft)

Population (2025-12-31)
  - Total: 339
  - Density: 89/km^{2} (230/sq mi)
- Time zone: UTC+01:00 (CET)
  - Summer (DST): UTC+02:00 (CEST)
- Postal codes: 54518
- Dialling codes: 06535
- Vehicle registration: WIL

Kesten (German pronunciation: [ˈkɛstn̩]) is an Ortsgemeinde – a municipality belonging to a Verbandsgemeinde, a kind of collective municipality – in the Bernkastel-Wittlich district in Rhineland-Palatinate, Germany.

== Geography ==
=== Location ===
The municipality lies surrounded by vineyards in the natural and cultivated landscape of the Moselle valley in the Trier region. Kesten is found in a small hollow on the river's left bank. The nearest middle centres are the double town of Bernkastel-Kues and the district seat, Wittlich. The university city of Trier lies roughly 28 km away as the crow flies. Kesten belongs to the Verbandsgemeinde of Bernkastel-Kues, whose seat is in the like-named town.

=== Climate ===
The town lies in a transitional zone between temperate oceanic climate and continental climate; compared to other regions in Germany, a very warm and sunny climate prevails here. In neighbouring Brauneberg on 11 August 1998, a record temperature of 41.2 °C in the shade, the highest ever air temperature recorded in the Federal Republic, was confirmed.

The barrier formed by the Eifel shields Kesten from west winds, putting it in a rain shadow and sometimes subjecting it to a föhn effect. At the same time, the warming of the air is favoured by the only slight exchange of air with the surrounding area. Tied in with this is the high humidity due to ongoing evaporation of water from the Moselle, which, especially in summer, makes at times for heavy and muggy weather, and which also brings many storms along with it.

== History ==
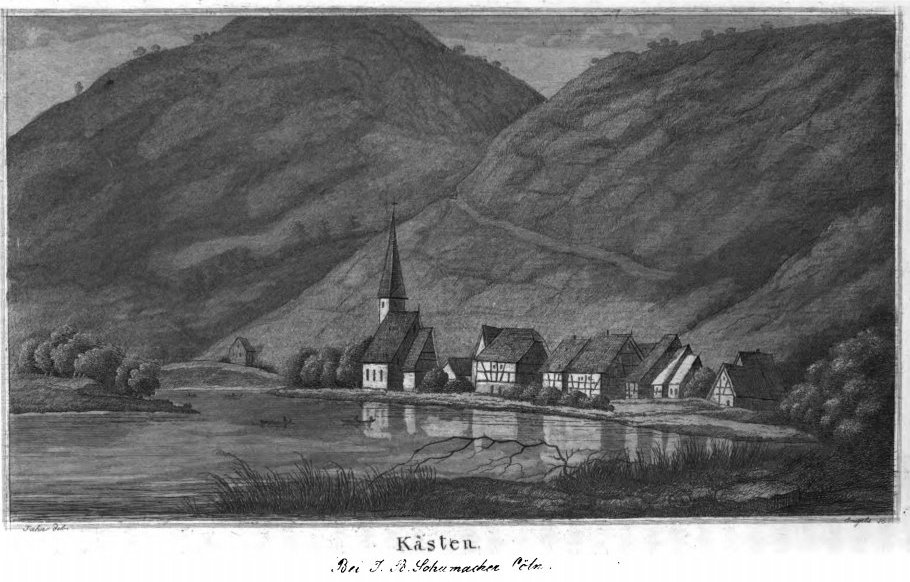
Romanticized view from 1838

In 936, Kesten had its first documentary mention, thus allowing Kesten to look back on a history of more than a thousand years.

== Politics ==
=== Municipal council ===
The council is made up of 8 council members, who were elected by majority vote at the municipal election held on 7 June 2009, and the honorary mayor as chairman.

=== Coat of arms ===
The municipality's arms might be described thus: Argent a cross gules surmounted by an inescutcheon sable charged with a bunch of grapes hanging from a vine couped at both ends Or.

== Culture and sightseeing ==
=== Regular events ===
Local history and wine festivals are held regularly. On the second weekend in July is the local sport club's sport festival, and on the second weekend in August comes “The Great Street Festival”. The Kesten music club stages a wine festival every other year at which the Wine Queen is crowned.

== Economy and infrastructure ==
Because it lies on the Moselle’s banks, Kesten is greatly endangered by flooding. Given this, a technological flood control system has been under construction since early 2009, designed around a 15-year flooding event cycle. Completion is foreseen for the summer of 2010, after which Kesten's location will be as well protected as it can be from flooding.

The flood control system will be put together as follows:

- Flood control walls, which as needed can be expanded with movable elements
- Flood control dykes
- Passages through the dykes that can be made fast with movable elements
- Flooding pumphouse
- Underground waterproofing with retaining walls

== Gallery ==
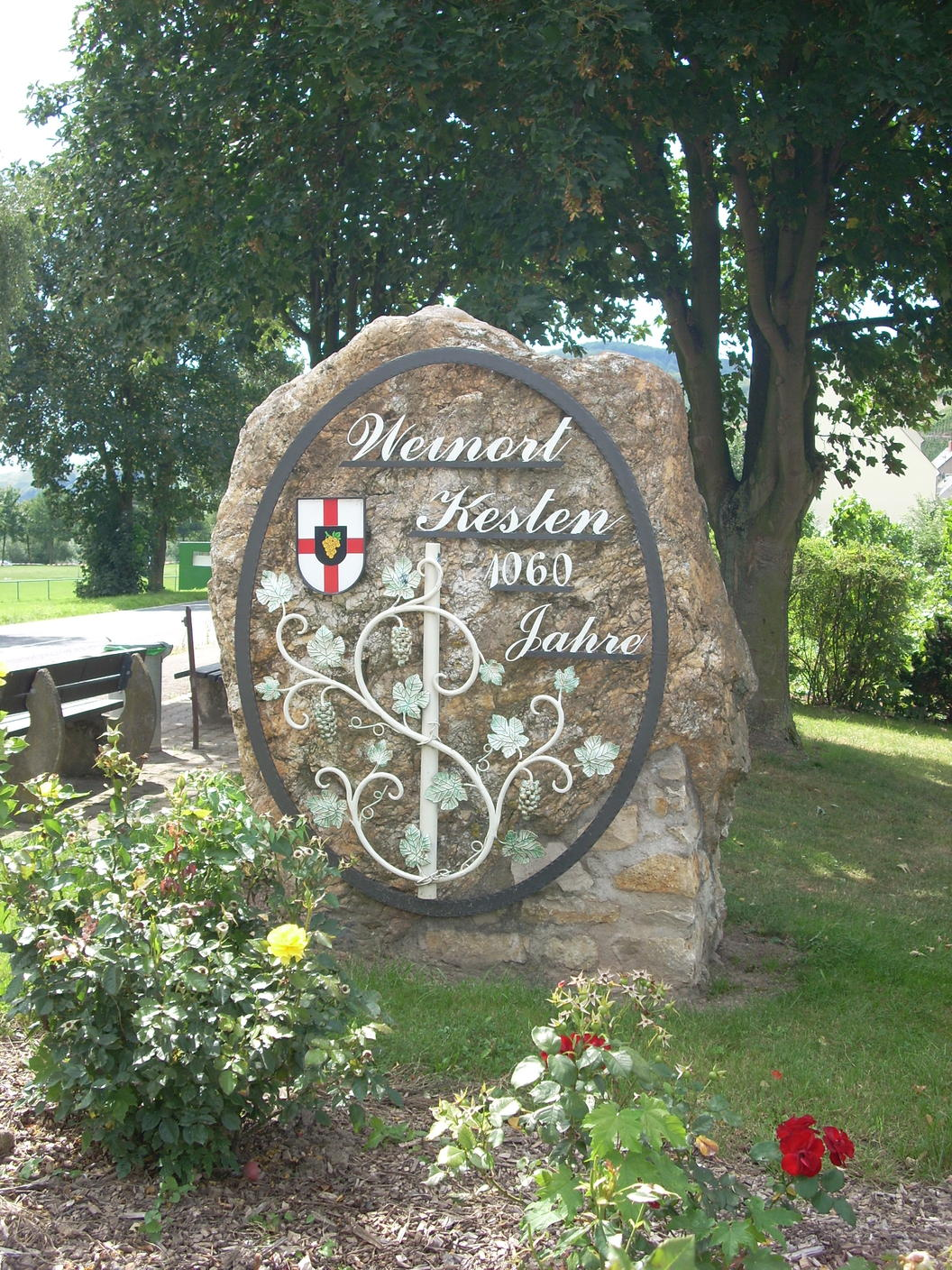
Entrance to Kesten

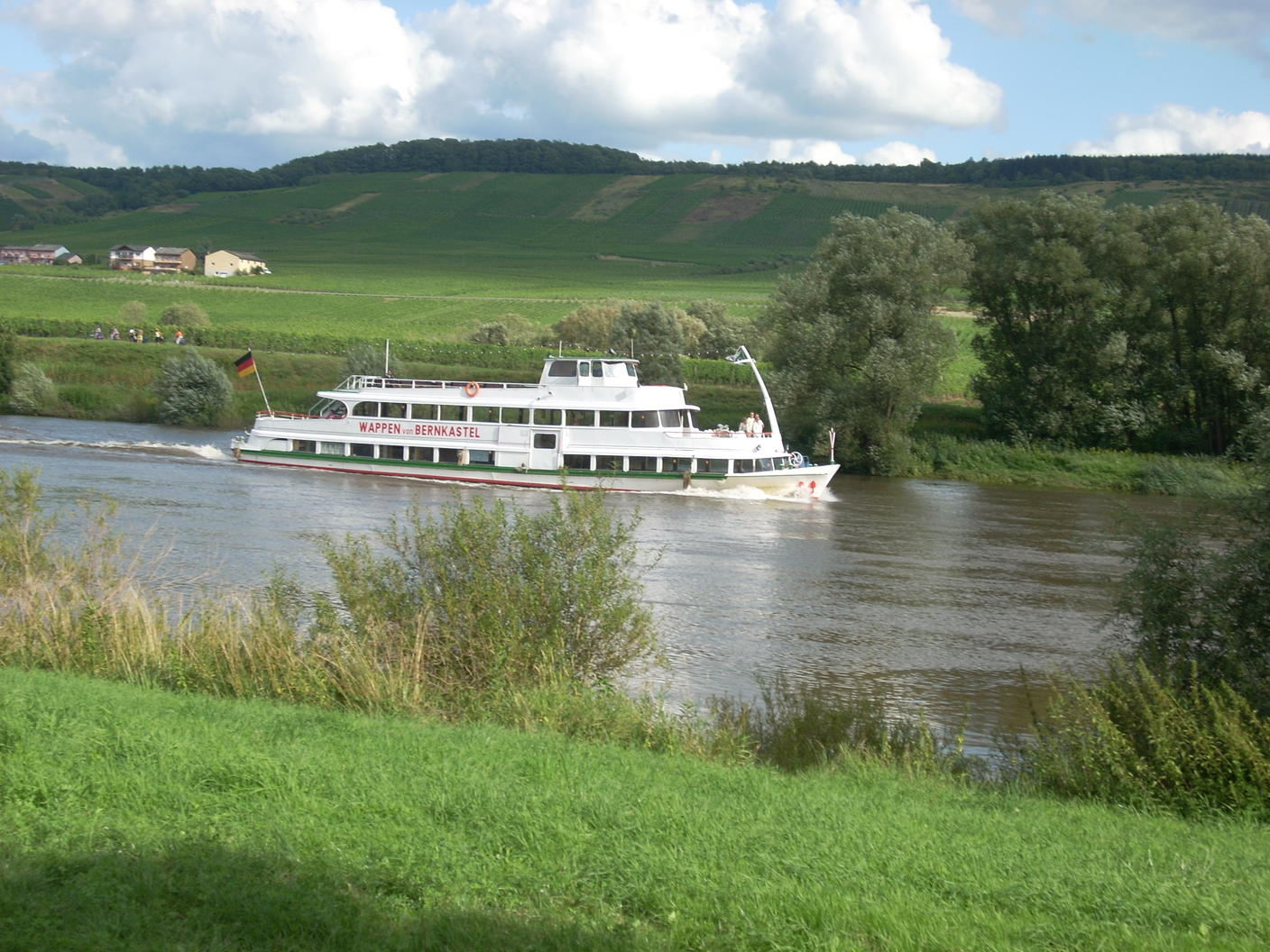
The Moselle at Kesten

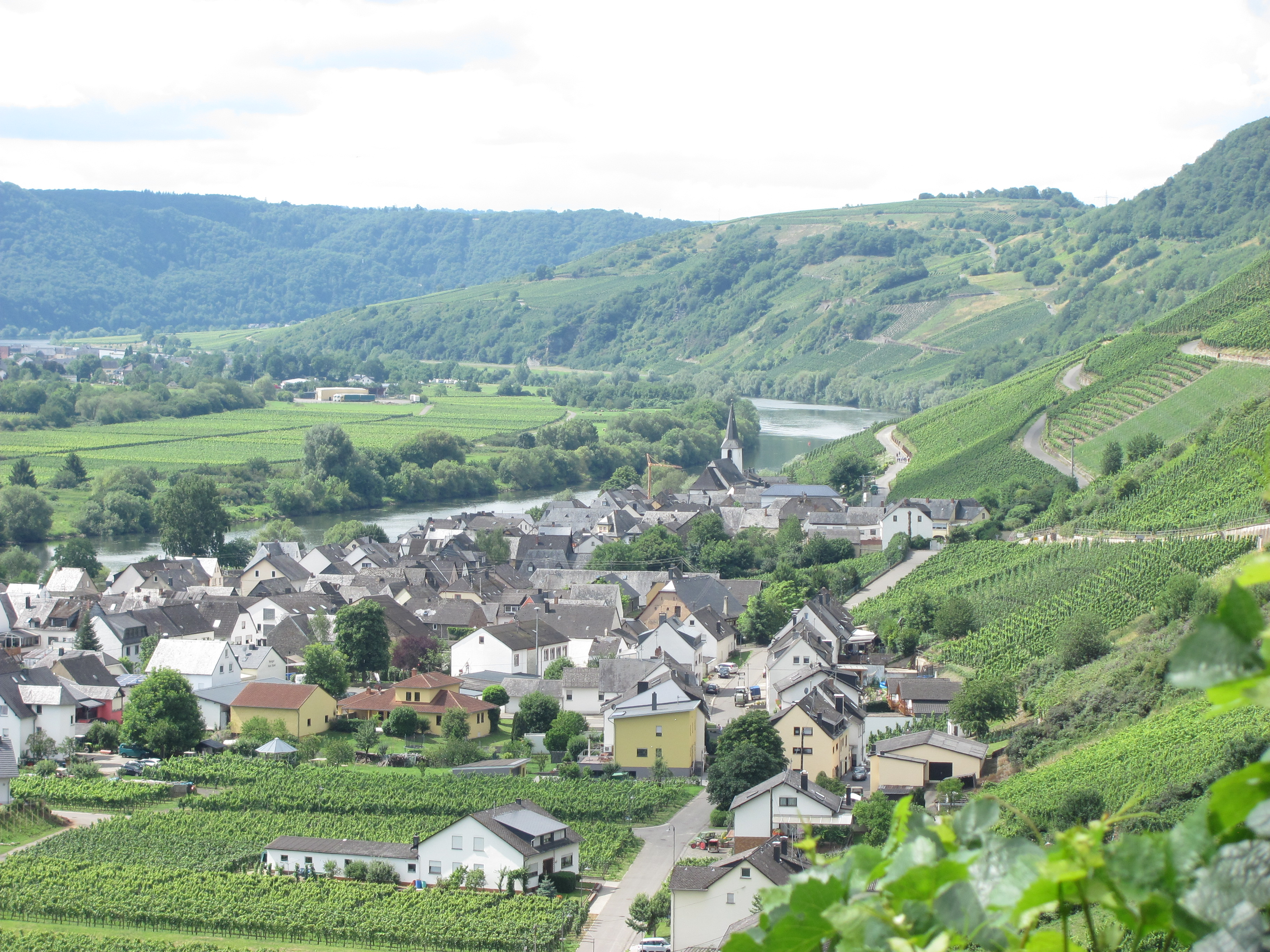
View over Kesten and the Moselle
