= Bernkastel-Kues (Verbandsgemeinde) =

- Verbandsgemeinde
- Coat of arms

- Location of Bernkastel-Kues within Bernkastel-Wittlich district
- Interactive map of Bernkastel-Kues
- Location within Germany Location within Rhineland-Palatinate
- Coordinates: 49°55′N 7°04′E
- Country: Germany
- State: Rhineland-Palatinate
- District: Bernkastel-Wittlich
- Seat: Bernkastel-Kues
- Subdivisions: 23 municipalities

Area
  - Total: 249 km^{2} (96 sq mi)

Population (2025-12-31)
  - Total: 27,275
  - Density: 110/km^{2} (284/sq mi)
- Time zone: UTC+01:00 (CET)
  - Summer (DST): UTC+02:00 (CEST)
- Website: www.bernkastel-kues.de

Bernkastel-Kues is a Verbandsgemeinde ("collective municipality") in the district Bernkastel-Wittlich, in Rhineland-Palatinate, Germany. The seat of the Verbandsgemeinde is in Bernkastel-Kues. The Verbandsgemeinde lies on both banks of the river Moselle, between Trier and Koblenz. The entire Verbandsgemeinde is 249 square kilometers large and has 27000 inhabitants.

The Verbandsgemeinde Bernkastel-Kues consists of the following Ortsgemeinden ("local municipalities"):

1. Bernkastel-Kues, Town
2. Brauneberg
3. Burgen
4. Erden
5. Gornhausen
6. Graach an der Mosel
7. Hochscheid
8. Kesten
9. Kleinich
10. Kommen
11. Lieser
12. Lösnich
13. Longkamp
14. Maring-Noviand
15. Minheim
16. Monzelfeld
17. Mülheim
18. Neumagen-Dhron
19. Piesport
20. Ürzig
21. Veldenz
22. Wintrich
23. Zeltingen-Rachtig
