= Lösnich =

- Municipality
- Coat of arms

- Location of Lösnich within Bernkastel-Wittlich district
- Interactive map of Lösnich
- Location within Germany Location within Rhineland-Palatinate
- Coordinates: 49°58′26″N 7°02′38″E
- Country: Germany
- State: Rhineland-Palatinate
- District: Bernkastel-Wittlich
- Municipal assoc.: Bernkastel-Kues

Area
  - Total: 2.53 km^{2} (0.98 sq mi)
- Elevation: 120 m (390 ft)

Population (2025-12-31)
  - Total: 503
  - Density: 199/km^{2} (515/sq mi)
- Time zone: UTC+01:00 (CET)
  - Summer (DST): UTC+02:00 (CEST)
- Postal codes: 54492
- Dialling codes: 06532
- Vehicle registration: WIL
- Website: www.loesnich.de

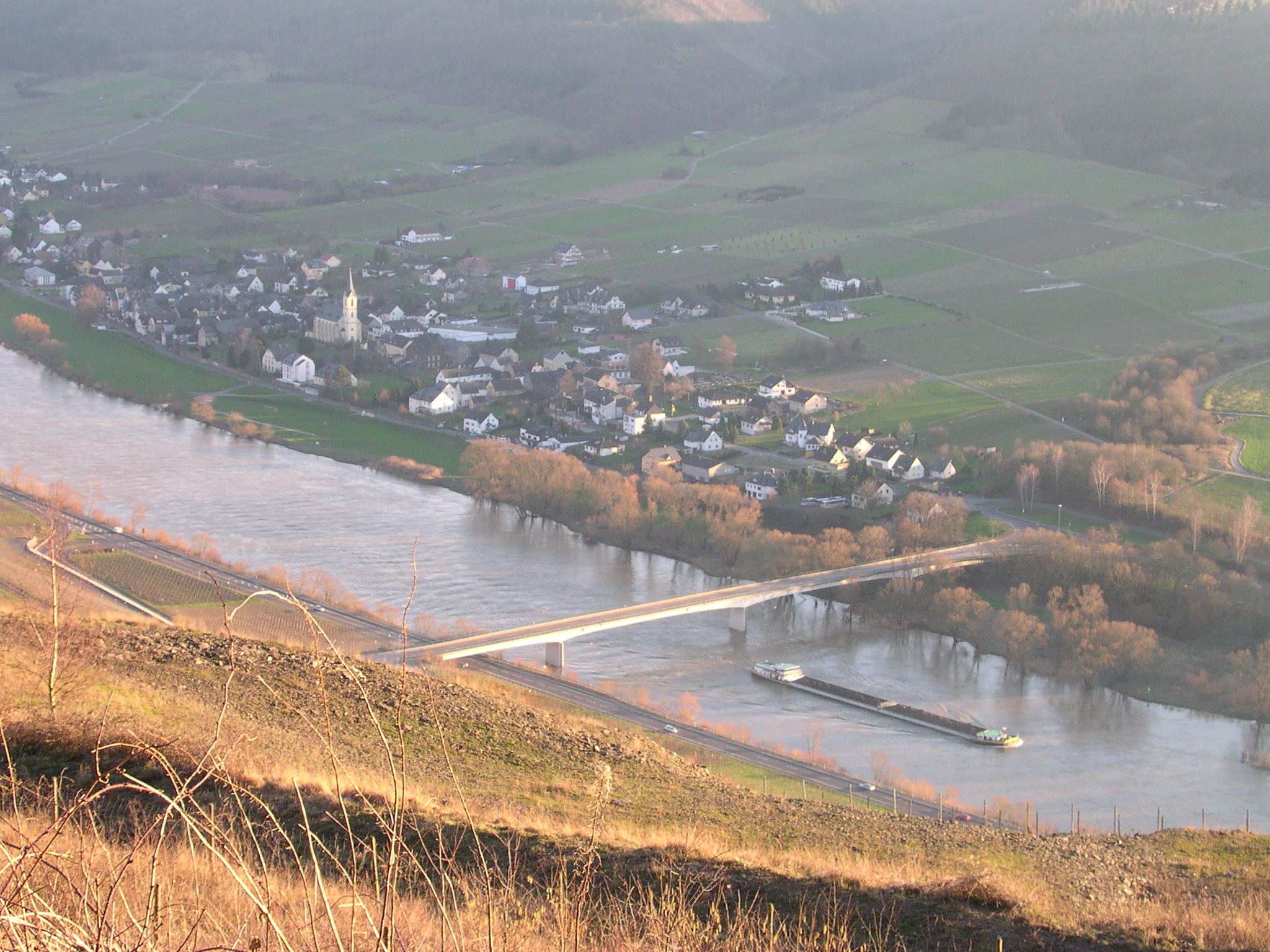
Lösnich seen from the Moselle's north bank

Lösnich is an Ortsgemeinde – a municipality belonging to a Verbandsgemeinde, a kind of collective municipality – in the Bernkastel-Wittlich district in Rhineland-Palatinate, Germany. It belongs to the Verbandsgemeinde of Bernkastel-Kues, whose seat is in the like-named town.

== History ==
In 1066, Lösnich had its first documentary mention.

== Politics ==
The council is made up of 8 council members, who were elected by proportional representation at the municipal election held on 7 June 2009, and the honorary mayor as chairman.

The municipal election held on 7 June 2009 yielded the following results:

Year	Gassen	FB	Total
2009	5	3	8 seats

== Culture and sightseeing ==
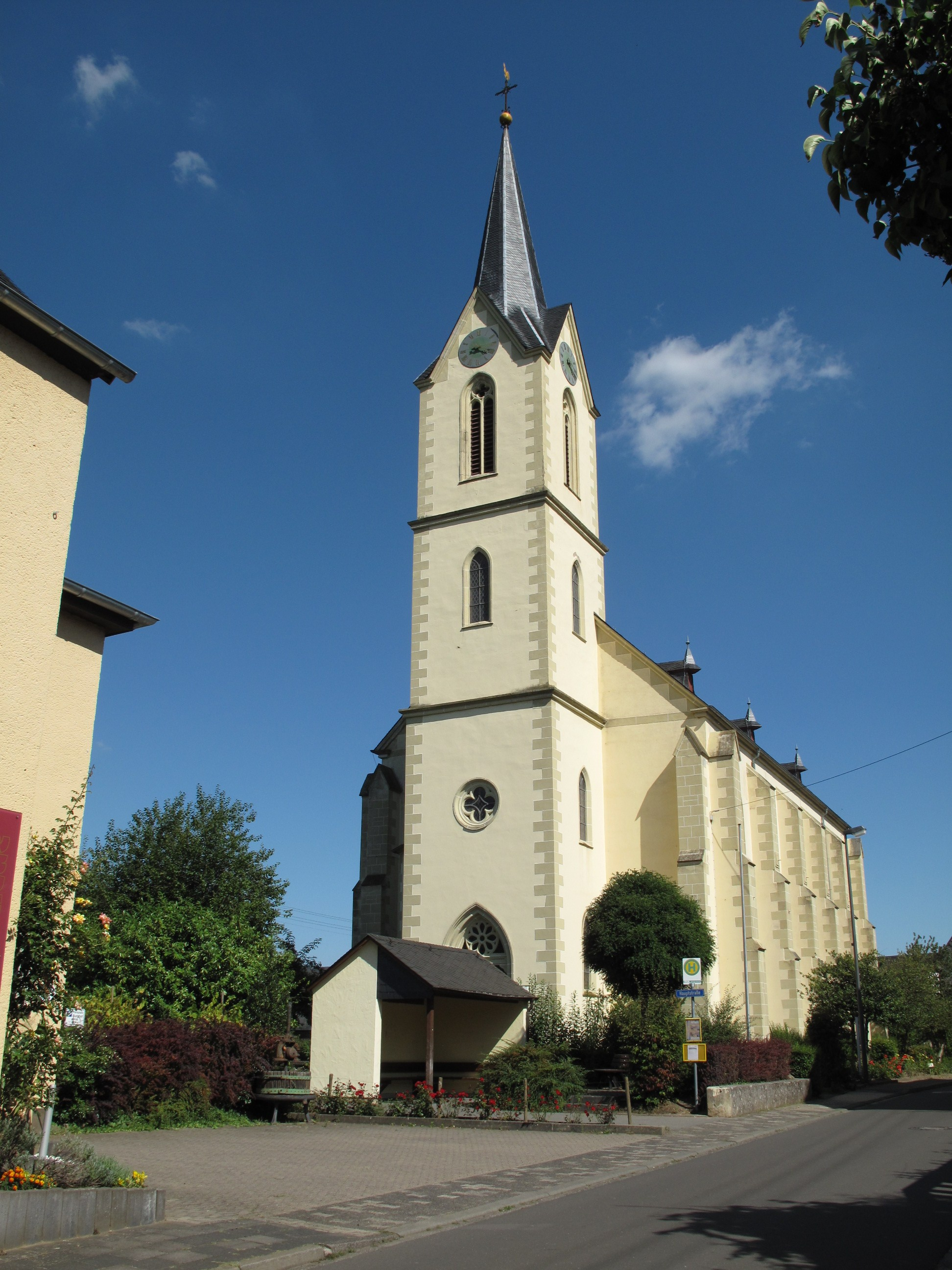
Church in Lösnich

Besides the many old timber-frame houses, the Kesselstatt Amt building, the Late Gothic graveyard chapel and the Gothic Revival parish church from 1869 are all popular for tourism.

== Economy and infrastructure ==
For centuries, Lösnich has been characterized by winegrowing and tourism. There are plans to build the High Moselle Crossing (Hochmoselübergang – a highway link whose centrepiece will be a long, high bridge over the Moselle) on Bundesstraße 50 right near Lösnich.
