= Burgen, Bernkastel-Wittlich =

Burgen
- Municipality
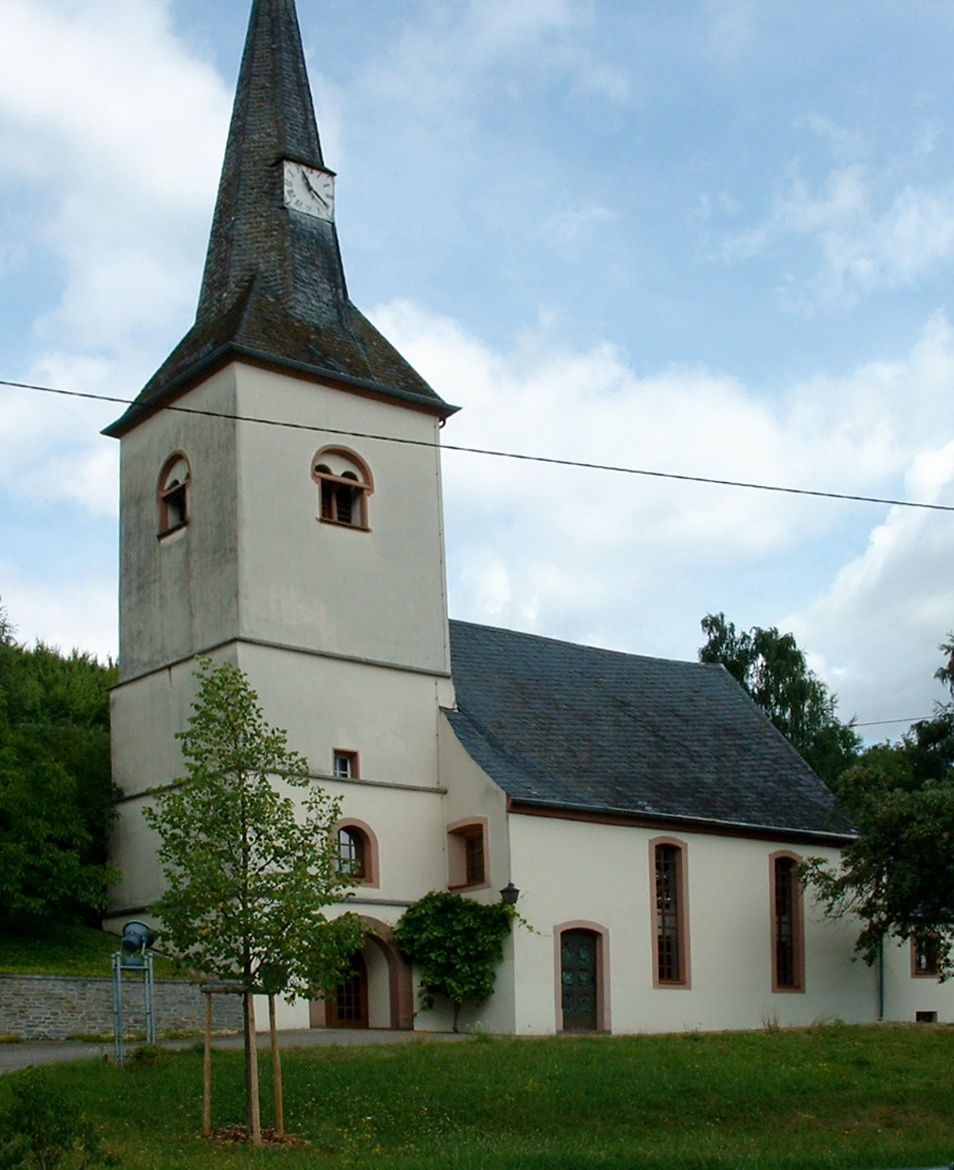
- Church in Burgen

- Coat of arms

- Location of Burgen within Bernkastel-Wittlich district
- Interactive map of Burgen
- Location within Germany Location within Rhineland-Palatinate
- Coordinates: 49°52′51″N 07°00′07″E
- Country: Germany
- State: Rhineland-Palatinate
- District: Bernkastel-Wittlich
- Municipal assoc.: Bernkastel-Kues

Government
  - Mayor (2019–24): Reinhard Grasnick

Area
  - Total: 7.78 km^{2} (3.00 sq mi)
- Elevation: 180 m (590 ft)

Population (2025-12-31)
  - Total: 581
  - Density: 74.7/km^{2} (193/sq mi)
- Time zone: UTC+01:00 (CET)
  - Summer (DST): UTC+02:00 (CEST)
- Postal codes: 54472
- Dialling codes: 06534
- Vehicle registration: WIL
- Website: www.burgen-bernkastel.de

Burgen (German pronunciation: [ˈbʊʁɡn̩]) is an Ortsgemeinde – a municipality belonging to a Verbandsgemeinde, a kind of collective municipality – in the Bernkastel-Wittlich district in Rhineland-Palatinate, Germany.

== Geography ==
=== Location ===
The municipality lies at the outermost end of an ancient river valley of the Middle Moselle, which formed at a time when the river had not settled on the course that it now follows. Burgen is found right below the Hunsrück’s first forests and from the point of view of transport, lies on a dead end. However, it can be reached from two directions, from Brauneberg over Kreisstraße 87 and from Veldenz over Kreisstraße 89. South of the municipality is only Brauneberg’s outlying centre of Hirzlei, where Kreisstraße 87 comes to an end. There is almost no through traffic.

Burgen belongs to the Verbandsgemeinde of Bernkastel-Kues, whose seat is in the like-named town.

=== Nearby communities ===
Neighbouring municipalities are, among others, Brauneberg with its outlying centre of Hirzlei and Veldenz. The nearest middle centres are the double town of Bernkastel-Kues some 6 km away, and Wittlich, some 14 km away. Trier is about 30 km away.

=== Climate ===
Burgen lies within the temperate zone; compared to other regions in Germany, a very warm and sunny climate prevails here. In neighbouring Brauneberg on 11 August 1998, a record temperature of 41.2 °C in the shade, the highest ever air temperature recorded in the Federal Republic, was confirmed. Because of its location alee of the Eifel, precipitation from northwest weather systems is often kept away. Ongoing evaporation of water from the Moselle regularly leads to high humidity, which, especially in summer, makes at times for heavy and muggy weather, and which also brings many storms along with it.

== History ==
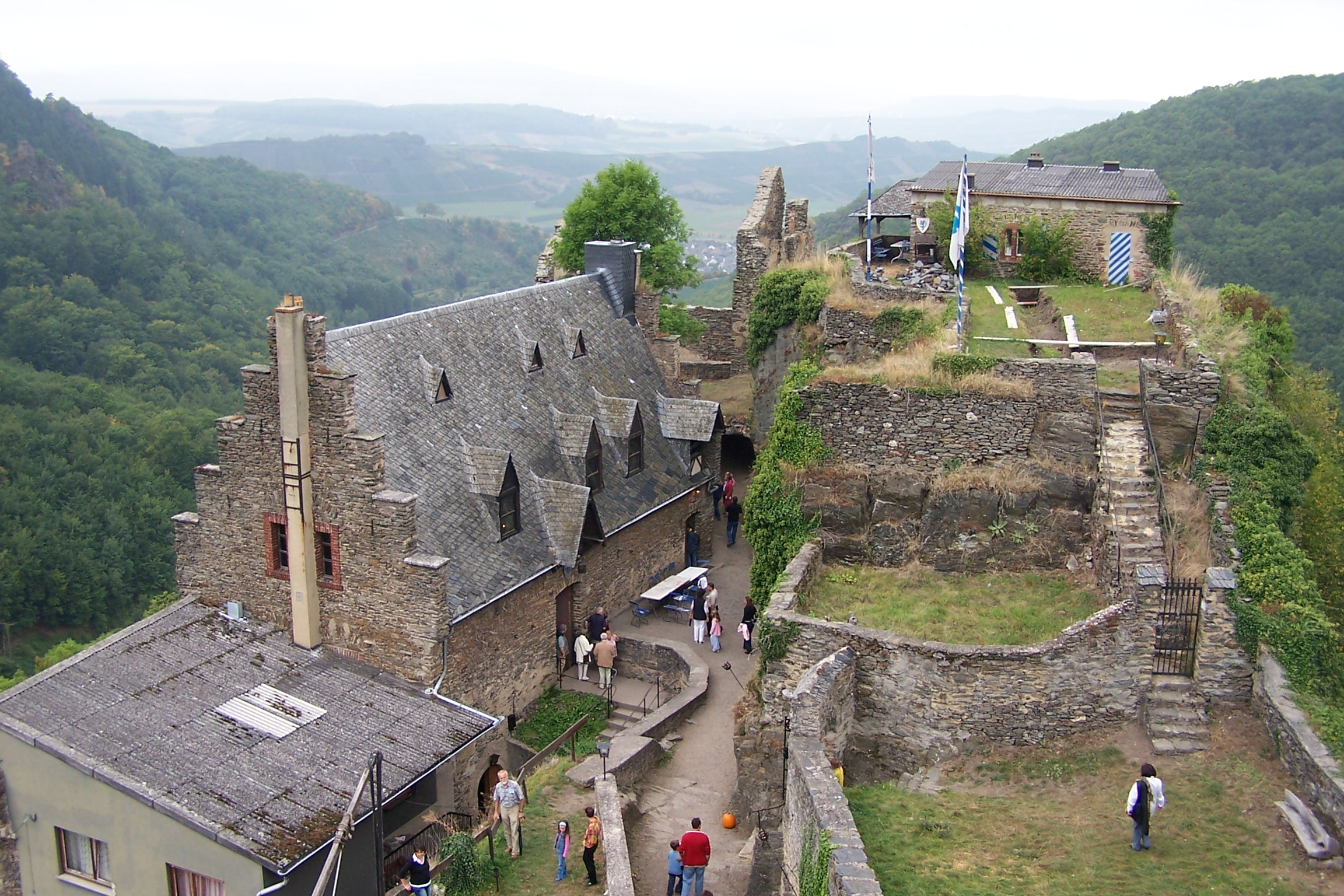
The village of Burgen was part of the former County of Veldenz. In the medieval the count resided in the nearby Veldenz Castle, some 1.5 km from Burgen.

In nearby areas, remnants of human habitation have been found from the Bronze Age, as have the ruins of a flight castle, the Heidenmauer (“Heathen Wall”), which is found some 1.5 km from Burgen behind Schloss Veldenz. As early as about 500 BC there came settlement by the Treveri, a people of mixed Celtic and Germanic stock, from whom the Latin name for the city of Trier, Augusta Treverorum, is also derived. From about 50 BC until sometime about AD 500 came the Romans, who found the place where Burgen now stands to be strategically favourable: the nearby Hunsrück plateau and the important Roman road from Trier by way of Bingen to Mainz could be reached without much effort. The climb up to the Hunsrück was secured with the help of a fortified military base – in Latin a burgus – which later took the folk form Burgen.

== Politics ==
=== Municipal council ===
The council is made up of 12 council members, who were elected at the municipal election held on 7 June 2009, and the honorary mayor as chairman.

The municipal election held on 7 June 2009 yielded the following results:

	Figure	Percent	Seats
Eligible voters	487	100.0	12
Voters	316	64.9
Invalid ballots	13	4.1
Valid ballots	303	95.9
Grasnik	141	46.5	5
Schwarz	69	22.8	3
Engel	93	30.7	4

=== Mayor ===
The mayor is Reinhard Grasnick.

=== Coat of arms ===
The municipality’s arms might be described thus: Per fess argent a lion passant azure armed Or and langued gules, and sable a castle gules with a gateway of the field and two towers each embattled of three and with two windows of the field, the wall masoned, surmounting which and emerging from base a mount of three vert.

== Culture and sightseeing ==
=== Winegrowing ===
Winegrowing is practised at the locations of Kirchberg, Hasenläufer and Römerberg. The last lies on the south slope with all-day sunshine, deep, humus-rich Devonian slate soil parallel to the famous Brauneberger Juffer. Hasenläufer is said to be the only mountain in Europe that is completely covered over with vineyards. There are several other wineries in the municipality; Riesling is the customary grape variety. Pinot noir, Chardonnay, Dornfelder, Kerner, Rivaner, Silvaner and Pinot blanc, among others, are also grown.

=== Sightseeing ===
Restored timber-frame and quarrystone houses, wine parlours and wineries characterize the local scene. Also worth mentioning is the watermill, which is under monumental protection, from late Biedermeier times in 1845 with and overshot waterwheel and two sets of grindstones. Besides regular tours, the museum offers presentation boards and information about the epoch, a cultural-historical overview of mill development and a description of the milling process with a side tour into food sciences. Part of the watermill is a vast nature garden complex with a brook, boxwood hedges, dry-stone walls and a herb bed.

Burgen hosts a Giant Sequoia tree, a species once found only in California but which can now be found worldwide. The Frohnbach flows through the village, open along its whole length. All together there are 19 stone, wooden and wrought iron bridges and footbridges crossing the brook. No other place in the region has quite so many bridges. Also found in Burgen are two churches, one Catholic and the other Evangelical.

=== Regular events ===
Regularly held in Burgen are a Shrovetide (Fastnacht) parade, a Maypole festival, Deutscher Mühlentag (“German Mill Day”, at Whitsun), the music club’s Lindenfest and the obligatory Saint Martin’s Day parade. The Burgener Bühnchen (“little stage”), a department of the Burgen local history club, stages theatrical productions. In nearby Bernkastel-Kues, with the onset of late summer each year comes the Großes Weinfest der Mittelmosel (“Great Wine Festival of the Middle Moselle”), one of the Moselle’s biggest wine festivals.

=== Sport ===
Burgen, together with the neighbouring municipality of Veldenz and the Morgan-Club Deutschland, regularly organizes Hunsrück hillclimbing events for classic sport cars. In 2000, Trier also became the official venue for the Rallye Deutschland, a heat on the way to the World Rally Championship. Since then, special stages have regularly been held in the area vineyards. The courses are distinguished by short, fast straightaways followed by sharp turns and switchback stretches of road in the sloped areas. Several tens of thousands of people come to the region around Burgen for this on the weekend in August when this is done.

== Economy and infrastructure ==
From days of yore, an important rôle has been played by winegrowing. Local demands are supplied by a village shop. The nearest small supermarket is found in neighbouring Veldenz, as is a discount store in neighbouring Brauneberg. Hiking trails lead around the village. Public transport is integrated into the Verkehrsverbund Region Trier (VRT), whose fares therefore apply.

== Famous people ==
- Johann Peter Petri (b. 1752; d. after 1812), Schinderhannes’s accomplice, known as Black Peter (Schwarzer Peter) and who gave his name to the card game (known in English as old maid).
