= Brauneberg =

- Municipality
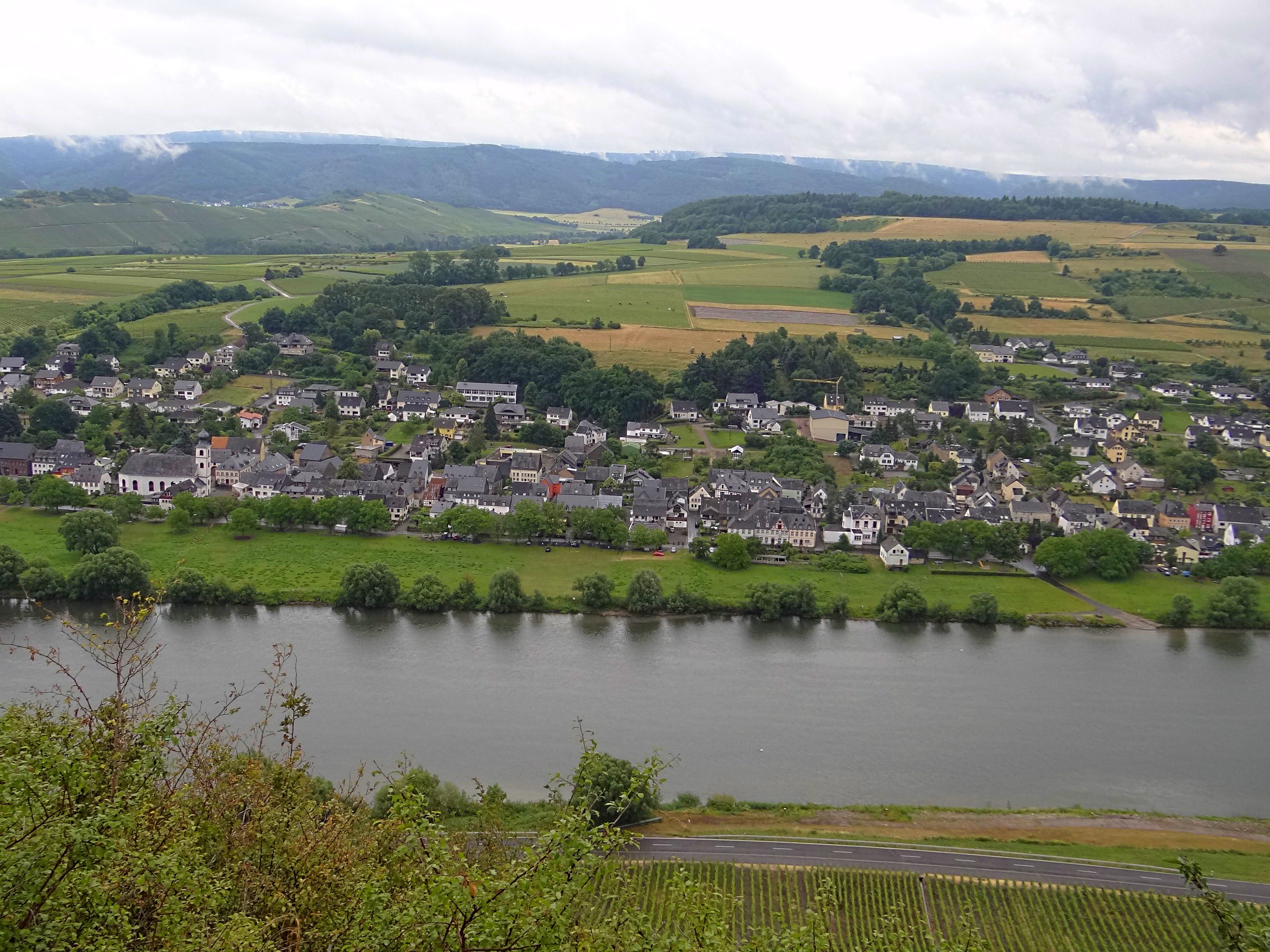

- Coat of arms

- Location of Brauneberg within Bernkastel-Wittlich district
- Interactive map of Brauneberg
- Location within Germany Location within Rhineland-Palatinate
- Coordinates: 49°54′30″N 6°59′07″E
- Country: Germany
- State: Rhineland-Palatinate
- District: Bernkastel-Wittlich
- Municipal assoc.: Bernkastel-Kues
- Subdivisions: 3 Ortsteile

Government
  - Mayor (2019–24): Werner Ruppenthal

Area
  - Total: 12.23 km^{2} (4.72 sq mi)
- Elevation: 124 m (407 ft)

Population (2025-12-31)
  - Total: 1,116
  - Density: 91.25/km^{2} (236.3/sq mi)
- Time zone: UTC+01:00 (CET)
  - Summer (DST): UTC+02:00 (CEST)
- Postal codes: 54472
- Dialling codes: 06534
- Vehicle registration: WIL
- Website: www.brauneberg.de

Brauneberg (German pronunciation: [ˈbʁaʊnəbɛʁk]) is an Ortsgemeinde – a municipality belonging to a Verbandsgemeinde, a kind of collective municipality – in the Bernkastel-Wittlich district in Rhineland-Palatinate, Germany. It is known above all for its wine and its meteorological distinctions.

== Geography ==
=== Location ===
The municipality lies on the Mosel near Bernkastel-Kues. It belongs to the Verbandsgemeinde of Bernkastel-Kues, whose seat is in the town of the same name.

=== Climate ===
Here on 11 August 1998, the highest ever temperature in Germany was measured, 41.2 °C, at the Meteomedia weather station by Jörg Kachelmann. Nevertheless, Brauneberg is not said to be Germany's number-one hotspot because the weather station is not included in official measurements owing to its location on a slate mountain.

=== Constituent communities ===
Brauneberg's Ortsteile are Brauneberg, Filzen and Hirzlei.

Although the outlying centre of Hirzlei is indeed an integral part of Brauneberg, there is no direct road linking it to the main centre. The village representative – Ortsvorsteher – of Hirzlei is Ewald Adam.

== History ==
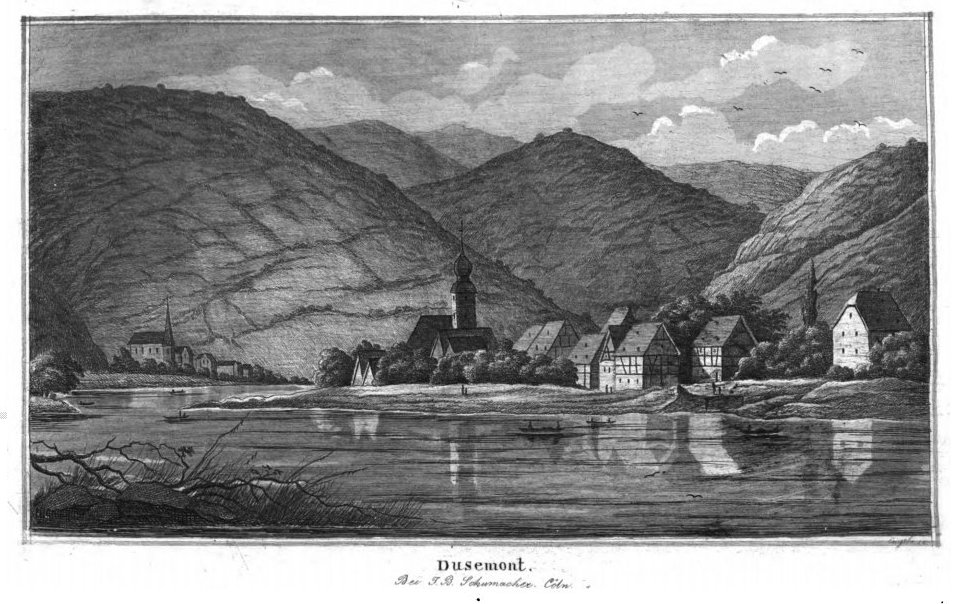
Dusemont 1838

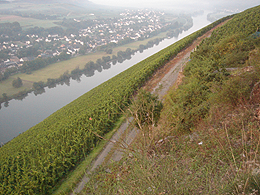
View of Brauneberg from the other side of the Moselle

The name Brauneberg is first mentioned in documents dating 588. The old placename, Dusemond, may well have stemmed from what one of the vineyards here was called in Roman times: dulcis mons (Latin for “sweet mountain”). In 1925, the village's name was changed to Brauneberg.

Dusemond belonged to the old County of Veldenz, into which Count Palatine Louis II introduced the Reformation in 1523. In the Thirty Years' War, the Prince-Archbishop-Elector of Trier seized ownership of the village. Only with the 1648 Peace of Westphalia was the Count of Veldenz reinstated with all his old rights, whereby the village's parish once more became Protestant. With the occupation of the County of Veldenz by France in 1680, however, the situation changed yet again and there arose a dispute over Catholics’ status within the County. By decree, the French settled the situation on 21 December 1684: Under its terms, in places with only one church – such as was the case in Dusemond – this would be given over to use by both denominations. The local church thus became a simultaneous church. Only in 1955 did this change, when it was decided to divide the church and separate it structurally. Since then, one third of the church has been used by the Evangelical congregation and the other two thirds by the Catholics. This matches the shares of the cost paid by each for the building of today's church, which was completed in 1777.

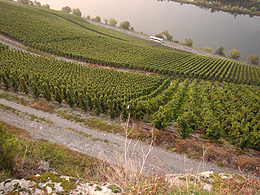
Juffer vineyard

The church itself was built between 1775 and 1777 to plans by Palatine court master builder Franz Wilhelm Rabaliatti. The onion-domed tower is the only such churchtower in the whole Moselle region. Although the church has been divided, it is still under both denominations’ joint ownership.

Today's municipality of Brauneberg came into being on 7 June 1969 through the merger of the municipalities of Brauneberg and Filzen.

== Politics ==
The municipal council is made up of 16 council members, who were elected by proportional representation at the municipal election held on 7 June 2009, and the honorary mayor as chairman. The sixteen seats on council are shared among the three voters’ groups Licht (6 seats), Denzer (6 seats) and Hepp (4 seats).

== Winegrowing ==
Besides tourism, winegrowing is the most important branch of industry. Vines are worked overwhelmingly in steep-slope vineyards in an area of 323 ha. Customarily, it is Riesling that is grown, although in some even and steep-slope vineyards smaller quantities of Müller-Thurgau, Kerner and Dornfelder are grown.

Brauneberg's vineyards belong to the winemaking appellation – Großlage – of Kurfürstlay, and are further grouped into these locations:

- Mandelgraben

The vines at Mandelgraben cover an area of 175 ha. The name refers to the almond trees (Mandel means “almond” in German) that once grew here.

- Klostergarten

Klostergarten is with its 95 ha Brauneberg's second biggest vineyard. The name comes from the garden (Garten) at the Franciscan convent (Kloster) in the outlying centre of Filzen.

- Juffer and Juffer Sonnenuhr

The steep slope opposite Brauneberg is called Juffer (Moselle Franconian for standard German Jungfer or Jungfrau – maiden or virgin). Within this location, the area around the sundial (Sonnenuhr) is regarded as the choicest part of the vineyard and is given the name Juffer Sonnenuhr.

- Kammer

This small vineyard of only 0.38 ha likewise lies in the Juffer underneath a jutting crag.

=== Historical ===
In 1868, under the leadership of the Royal Cadastral Inspector, Steuerrath Clotten, a winegrowing map for the Regierungsbezirk of Trier was compiled for the Royal government at Trier. For the Brauneberg (Dusemond) area, under the Großlage of Brauneberg, the following individual locations were marked on it:

- Hasenläufer
- Kammer
- Falkenberg
- Juffer
- Mötschert
- Burgerslay

== Famous people ==
=== Sons and daughters of the town ===
- Ulli Bögershausen, internationally known solo guitarist and guitar teacher
- Katja Fehres, Moselle Wine Queen, Mosel-Saar-Ruwer 2006/2007
- Fabian Ostermann, conductor and international juror of CISM (Confédération Internationale des Sociétés musicales)
- Johann Matthias Schreiber (1709–1771), German organ builder
- Julius P. Heil (1876-1949), 30th Governor of the State of Wisconsin.
