= Manderscheid (Verbandsgemeinde) =

Municipality in Rhineland-Palatinate, Germany

Coordinates: 50°05′41″N 6°48′46″E

Manderscheid is a former Verbandsgemeinde ("collective municipality") in the district Bernkastel-Wittlich, in Rhineland-Palatinate, Germany. Its seat of administration was in Manderscheid. On 1 July 2014 it merged into the Verbandsgemeinde Wittlich-Land.

The Verbandsgemeinde Manderscheid consisted of the following Ortsgemeinden ("local municipalities"):

1. Bettenfeld
2. Dierfeld
3. Eckfeld
4. Eisenschmitt
5. Gipperath
6. Greimerath
7. Großlittgen
8. Hasborn
9. Karl
10. Laufeld
11. Manderscheid
12. Meerfeld
13. Musweiler
14. Niederöfflingen
15. Niederscheidweiler
16. Oberöfflingen
17. Oberscheidweiler
18. Pantenburg
19. Schladt
20. Schwarzenborn
21. Wallscheid
