= Landscheid =

- Municipality
- Coat of arms

- Location of Landscheid within Bernkastel-Wittlich district
- Interactive map of Landscheid
- Location within Germany Location within Rhineland-Palatinate
- Coordinates: 49°59′14″N 6°46′21″E
- Country: Germany
- State: Rhineland-Palatinate
- District: Bernkastel-Wittlich
- Municipal assoc.: Wittlich-Land

Government
  - Mayor (2019–24): Michael Comes

Area
  - Total: 30.19 km^{2} (11.66 sq mi)
- Elevation: 310 m (1,020 ft)

Population (2025-12-31)
  - Total: 2,186
  - Density: 72.41/km^{2} (187.5/sq mi)
- Time zone: UTC+01:00 (CET)
  - Summer (DST): UTC+02:00 (CEST)
- Postal codes: 54526
- Dialling codes: 06567, 06575
- Vehicle registration: WIL
- Website: www.landscheid.de

Landscheid (German pronunciation: [ˈlantˌʃaɪt]; in the Eifel dialect: Lähscheld) is an Ortsgemeinde – which is a municipality belonging to a Verbandsgemeinde, a kind of collective municipality – in the Bernkastel-Wittlich district of Rhineland-Palatinate, Germany.

== Geography ==
=== Location ===
The municipality lies in the Eifel region. The municipal area is 56% wooded and 31% of it is under cultivation. Landscheid belongs to the Verbandsgemeinde of Wittlich-Land, whose seat is in Wittlich, although that town is itself not in the Verbandsgemeinde.

=== Constituent municipalities ===
Landscheid’s Ortsteile (villages) are Burg an der Salm, Landscheid and Niederkail. Also belonging to Landscheid are the homesteads of Hau, Raskop, Mulbach and the Altenhof.

=== Neighbouring municipalities ===
Landscheid borders on Großlittgen, Hupperath, Bergweiler, Bruch, Arenrath, Binsfeld, Spangdahlem, Gransdorf and Schwarzenborn.

== History ==
The first traces of settlers come from the first centuries of the Christian Era. The Burscheider Mauer is a Celtic ringwall that was used as a refuge castle.

In 1157, Landscheid had its first documentary mention as Langescheit. Today’s outlying centre of Burg was first mentioned in a written document in 1184, as was Niederkail in 1211. The landlord was Himmerod Abbey, and the overlord was the Archbishopric of Trier. Another source says that in 1070, Niederkail was mentioned as the nobleman Godefried von der Keyle’s home.

Beginning in 1794, the Landscheid area lay under French rule. In 1815, it was assigned to the Kingdom of Prussia at the Congress of Vienna. Since 1946, it has been part of the then newly founded state of Rhineland-Palatinate.

With effect from 1 December 1975, the three municipalities of Burg (Salm) with 390 inhabitants, Landscheid (1135 inhabitants) and Niederkail (627 inhabitants), which until this time had been self-administering, were dissolved and the municipality of Landscheid was reconstituted through a merger of the three former municipalities.

== Politics ==
=== Municipal council ===
The council is made up of 16 council members, who were elected by proportional representation at the municipal election held on 7 June 2009, and the honorary mayor as chairman.

The municipal election held on 7 June 2009 yielded the following results:

Year	SPD	CDU	FWG	Total
2009	2	8	6	16 seats
2004	2	8	6	16 seats

=== Coat of arms ===
The German blazon reads: Schild gespalten, vorne in Gold ein blauer Krummstab, hinten in Rot ein sechs-speichiges goldenes Rad.

The municipality’s arms might be described in English heraldic language thus: A parted shield; a blue crozier in front of gold, a six-spoked golden wheel in front of red.

The blue crozier symbolises Abbess Gertrude of Nivelles, who is the church’s patron. The six-spoked golden wheel was taken from the arms formerly borne by the once self-administering municipality of Niederkail. It symbolises both itinerant trade and agriculture.

Landscheid was granted the right to bear its own arms on 5 December 1980 by the Regierungsbezirk government in Trier.

== Culture and sightseeing ==
=== Regular events ===
In the main centre of Landscheid, in the tradition of the old itinerant trade, a spring market and a Christmas market are held.

== Economy and infrastructure ==
=== Transport ===
The Autobahn A 60 runs through the municipality with an interchange right in Landscheid. Bundesstraße 50 links Landscheid with the regional centres of Wittlich and Bitburg.

Landscheid is connected to local public transport by RegioLinie 400 (Bitburg-Wittlich).

=== Established businesses ===
- Metalware dealer 'suki.international' GmbH, which has roughly half of the market share in Germany in blister-packed small hardware items
- Börner GmbH, a maker of household products with about 70 employees
- Forst-Service Raskop GmbH& Co.KG, in Landscheid ist Ihr Spezialist für forstwirtschaft. Dienstleistungen, Rundholz Holzhackschnitzel und Problembaumfällung

=== Education ===
There is one kindergarten with all-day childcare and one primary school in Landscheid. Secondary schools are to be found in Wittlich and Bitburg.
