= Dierfeld =

- Municipality
- Coat of arms

- Location of Dierfeld within Bernkastel-Wittlich district
- Interactive map of Dierfeld
- Location within Germany Location within Rhineland-Palatinate
- Coordinates: 50°05′04″N 06°53′24″E
- Country: Germany
- State: Rhineland-Palatinate
- District: Bernkastel-Wittlich
- Municipal assoc.: Wittlich-Land

Government
  - Mayor (2019–24): Roderich von Greve-Dierfeld

Area
  - Total: 1.54 km^{2} (0.59 sq mi)
- Elevation: 420 m (1,380 ft)

Population (2025-12-31)
  - Total: 15
  - Density: 9.7/km^{2} (25/sq mi)
- Time zone: UTC+01:00 (CET)
  - Summer (DST): UTC+02:00 (CEST)
- Postal codes: 54533
- Dialling codes: 06572
- Vehicle registration: WIL
- Website: www.dierfeld.de

Dierfeld is an Ortsgemeinde – a municipality belonging to a Verbandsgemeinde, a kind of collective municipality – in the Bernkastel-Wittlich district in Rhineland-Palatinate, Germany. Among Germany’s smallest municipalities, it is the least populous, with just 9 people living in the municipality.

== Geography ==
=== Location ===
Dierfeld can only be reached from the west over a small road that links the place with Laufeld. It belongs to the Verbandsgemeinde Wittlich-Land.

=== Neighbouring municipalities ===
Besides Laufeld, the other neighbours are Wallscheid, Mückeln, Oberscheidweiler, Hasborn, Niederöfflingen and Oberöfflingen.

== History ==
Dierfeld arose from a hunting lodge that the Counts of Manderscheid had built in the 16th century. Beginning in 1794, Dierfeld lay under French rule. In 1814 it was assigned to the Kingdom of Prussia at the Congress of Vienna. Since 1947, it has been part of the then newly founded state of Rhineland-Palatinate.

=== Population ===
Dierfeld has only nine inhabitants and is thereby the least populous municipality in all of Germany (as of 2021). The municipality’s head and mayor is Gerhard von Greve-Dierfeld.

== Politics ==
The municipal council is made up of 6 council members (this, of course, means that only two people in the municipality are not on council), who were elected by majority vote at the municipal election held on 7 June 2009, and the honorary mayor as chairman.

At elections to the European Parliament, the Bundestag and the Landtag, a common voting area has been formed with Manderscheid to ensure that ballots are kept secret.

In 2006, the municipality had the highest commercial tax rates in Rhineland-Palatinate. This was resolved by the mayor, who is also the owner of a tree nursery. The municipality is debt-free.
