= Gladbach, Rhineland-Palatinate =

Gladbach
- Municipality
- Coat of arms

- Location of Gladbach within Bernkastel-Wittlich district
- Interactive map of Gladbach
- Location within Germany Location within Rhineland-Palatinate
- Coordinates: 49°56′05″N 6°46′07″E
- Country: Germany
- State: Rhineland-Palatinate
- District: Bernkastel-Wittlich
- Municipal assoc.: Wittlich-Land

Government
  - Mayor (2019–24): Sylvia Krones

Area
  - Total: 3.60 km^{2} (1.39 sq mi)
- Elevation: 260 m (850 ft)

Population (2025-12-31)
  - Total: 368
  - Density: 102/km^{2} (265/sq mi)
- Time zone: UTC+01:00 (CET)
  - Summer (DST): UTC+02:00 (CEST)
- Postal codes: 54518
- Dialling codes: 06508
- Vehicle registration: WIL

Gladbach is an Ortsgemeinde – a municipality in a Verbandsgemeinde (collective municipality) in the Bernkastel-Wittlich district in Rhineland-Palatinate, Germany.

== Geography ==
=== Location ===
The municipality lies in the Eifel and belongs to the Verbandsgemeinde of Wittlich-Land, whose seat is in Wittlich, although that town is itself not in the Verbandsgemeinde.

== History ==
The municipality’s first documentary mention goes back to directories of holdings at the Abbey of Echternach. At the end of the 8th century, a kingly estate (fisci) named Dreyse (Dreis) on the river Salmana (Salm) was donated to the Abbey by Charlemagne’s brother Carloman. This estate included several nearby holdings

On 28 October 895, King Zwentibold acknowledged the Abbey’s holdings after being requested to do so by Archbishop of Trier Ratbold. Listed in this directory of holdings is, among other places, Gladbach.

Gladbach was a lordly domain of the Duchy of Luxembourg and was assigned to the lordship of Bruch. In Gladbach and nearby Bruch, unlike the development in Dreis, the Abbey of Echternach could not extend its lordly authority, as the river Salm formed the boundary between the Duchy of Luxembourg and the Electorate of Trier. Gladbach and Bruch lay on the Salm’s right bank, putting them on the Luxembourg side.

Beginning in 1794, Gladbach lay under French rule. In 1814 it was assigned to the Kingdom of Prussia at the Congress of Vienna. Since 1947, it has been part of the then newly founded state of Rhineland-Palatinate.

== Politics ==
=== Municipal council ===
The council is made up of 8 council members, who were elected by majority vote proportional representation at the municipal election held on 7 June 2009, and the honorary mayor as chairman.

=== Mayor ===
The mayor is Sylvia Krones.

=== Coat of arms ===
The German blazon reads: In Blau auf einem goldenen Wellenschildfuß, darin ein roter Wellenbalken, ein gekürzter goldener Abtstab, begleitet rechts und links von je einem silbernen fehförmigen Eisenhut.

The municipality’s arms might in English heraldic language be described thus: Azure issuant from base a abbot’s staff Or between two vair pips argent in fess, in a base wavy of the second a fess wavy gules.

== Culture and sightseeing ==
- Flour mill on the Gladbach (also the local river’s name), mentioned in a written record in 1409
- Oil mill, newly built in 1785
- Martinsbrunnen (fountain)

== Sources ==
- Andreas Wisniewski: Kreisjahrbuch Bernkastel-Wittlich. o. J.
