= Manderscheid =

Manderscheid can refer to:

- Manderscheid, Bernkastel-Wittlich, a town in Germany
- Manderscheid (Verbandsgemeinde), a former collective municipality in Bernkastel-Wittlich, Rhineland-Palatinate, Germany
- Manderscheid, Bitburg-Prüm a village in Germany
- County of Manderscheid, historical state of the Holy Roman Empire centered on Manderscheid, Bernkastel-Wittlich
