= Schladt =

- Municipality
- Coat of arms

- Location of Schladt within Bernkastel-Wittlich district
- Interactive map of Schladt
- Location within Germany Location within Rhineland-Palatinate
- Coordinates: 50°01′56″N 6°50′30″E
- Country: Germany
- State: Rhineland-Palatinate
- District: Bernkastel-Wittlich
- Municipal assoc.: Wittlich-Land

Government
  - Mayor (2019–24): Rainer Ernst

Area
  - Total: 4.96 km^{2} (1.92 sq mi)
- Elevation: 330 m (1,080 ft)

Population (2025-12-31)
  - Total: 151
  - Density: 30.4/km^{2} (78.8/sq mi)
- Time zone: UTC+01:00 (CET)
  - Summer (DST): UTC+02:00 (CEST)
- Postal codes: 54534
- Dialling codes: 06575
- Vehicle registration: WIL

Schladt (German pronunciation: [ʃlat]) is an Ortsgemeinde – a municipality belonging to a Verbandsgemeinde, a kind of collective municipality – in the Bernkastel-Wittlich district in Rhineland-Palatinate, Germany.

== Geography ==
=== Location ===
The municipality lies in the Eifel east of the river Lieser in a stretch of countryside known as the “Schladt Switzerland” (Schladter Schweiz). The nearest major town is Wittlich, some 6 km away. Schladt belongs to the Verbandsgemeinde Wittlich-Land.

=== Neighbouring municipalities ===
Schladt's neighbours are Gipperath, Plein, Minderlittgen, Großlittgen and Karl.

== History ==
Beginning in 1794, Schladt lay under French rule. In 1814 it was assigned to the Kingdom of Prussia at the Congress of Vienna. Since 1947, it has been part of the then newly founded state of Rhineland-Palatinate.

== Politics ==
=== Municipal council ===
The council is made up of 6 council members, who were elected by majority vote at the municipal election held on 7 June 2009, and the honorary mayor as chairman.

=== Coat of arms ===
The German blazon reads: Gespalten von Gold und Silber durch eine eingebogene blaue Spitze, darin zwei gekreuzte goldene Kerzen, rechts ein roter Sparrenbalken, links eine schwarze Lilie.

The municipality's arms might in English heraldic language be described thus: Tierced in mantle, dexter Or a fess dancetty gules, sinister argent a fleur-de-lis sable, and in base azure two candles in saltire of the first, lit with fire of the third.

The crossed candles are one of Saint Blaise’s attributes and thus represent him, the church’s and the village’s longtime patron saint. The zigzag stripe (“fess dancetty”) seen on the dexter (armsbearer's right, viewer's left) side is the armorial charge once borne by the Lords of Manderscheid, who were Schladt's landholders until feudalism finally ended in the region. Before them came the Abbey of Echternach, which held Schladt until the mid 14th century, and whose armorial bearing was the black lily now seen on the sinister (armsbearer's left, viewer's right) side of the municipality's arms.

== Culture and sightseeing ==
- 600-year-old village oak with girth of 5.20 m
- Chapel in the village centre

== Economy and infrastructure ==
To the south runs the Autobahn A 60, and to the east the A 1. In Wittlich is a railway station on the Koblenz-Trier railway line.
