= Musweiler =

- Municipality
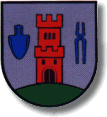
- Coat of arms

- Location of Musweiler within Bernkastel-Wittlich district
- Interactive map of Musweiler
- Location within Germany Location within Rhineland-Palatinate
- Coordinates: 50°00′36″N 6°48′08″E
- Country: Germany
- State: Rhineland-Palatinate
- District: Bernkastel-Wittlich
- Municipal assoc.: Wittlich-Land

Government
  - Mayor (2019–24): Stephan Zens

Area
  - Total: 3.05 km^{2} (1.18 sq mi)
- Elevation: 330 m (1,080 ft)

Population (2025-12-31)
  - Total: 52
  - Density: 17/km^{2} (44/sq mi)
- Time zone: UTC+01:00 (CET)
  - Summer (DST): UTC+02:00 (CEST)
- Postal codes: 54534
- Dialling codes: 06575
- Vehicle registration: WIL

Musweiler is an Ortsgemeinde – a municipality belonging to a Verbandsgemeinde, a kind of collective municipality – in the Bernkastel-Wittlich district in Rhineland-Palatinate, Germany.

== Geography ==
=== Location ===
The municipality lies in the Eifel. The nearest large town is the district seat, Wittlich, some 6 km to the east. Musweiler belongs to the Verbandsgemeinde Wittlich-Land.

=== Neighbouring municipalities ===
Musweiler borders in the north on Großlittgen, in the east on Minderlittgen and Hupperath and in the south on Landscheid.

== History ==
Musweiler’s moated castle was an Electoral-Trier fief held by the Lords of Manderscheid, who for a time further enfeoffed the Lords of Esch with their holding. Beginning in 1794, Musweiler lay under French rule. In 1814 it was assigned to the Kingdom of Prussia at the Congress of Vienna. Since 1947, it has been part of the then newly founded state of Rhineland-Palatinate.

== Politics ==
=== Municipal council ===
The council is made up of 6 council members, who were elected by majority vote at the municipal election held on 7 June 2009, and the honorary mayor as chairman.

=== Coat of arms ===
The municipality’s arms might be described thus: Argent on a mount in base vert a tower embattled on each of two floors gules between a spade and tongs, both palewise and azure.

== Economy and infrastructure ==
To the south runs Bundesstraße 60. In Wittlich is a railway station on the Koblenz-Trier railway line.
