= Pantenburg =

- Municipality
- Coat of arms

- Location of Pantenburg within Bernkastel-Wittlich district
- Interactive map of Pantenburg
- Location within Germany Location within Rhineland-Palatinate
- Coordinates: 50°05′33″N 6°50′39″E
- Country: Germany
- State: Rhineland-Palatinate
- District: Bernkastel-Wittlich
- Municipal assoc.: Wittlich-Land

Government
  - Mayor (2019–24): Christoph Lamberty

Area
  - Total: 4.98 km^{2} (1.92 sq mi)
- Elevation: 430 m (1,410 ft)

Population (2025-12-31)
  - Total: 247
  - Density: 49.6/km^{2} (128/sq mi)
- Time zone: UTC+01:00 (CET)
  - Summer (DST): UTC+02:00 (CEST)
- Postal codes: 54531
- Dialling codes: 06572
- Vehicle registration: WIL

Pantenburg (in Eifel dialect: Pahntebuasch) is an Ortsgemeinde – a municipality belonging to a Verbandsgemeinde, a kind of collective municipality – in the Bernkastel-Wittlich district in Rhineland-Palatinate, Germany.

== Geography ==
The municipality lies in the Eifel. To the west lies Manderscheid, and to the east Wallscheid. Running straight through the hamlet of Buchholz to the north is the municipal boundary between Pantenburg and Eckfeld. Pantenburg belongs to the Verbandsgemeinde Wittlich-Land.

== History ==
Beginning in 1794, Pantenburg lay under French rule. In 1814 it was assigned to the Kingdom of Prussia at the Congress of Vienna. Since 1947, it has been part of the then newly founded state of Rhineland-Palatinate.

== Politics ==
The council is made up of 6 council members, who were elected by majority vote at the municipal election held on 7 June 2009, and the honorary mayor as chairman.

== Economy and infrastructure ==
Near Pantenburg, before it was disused, ran the Wittlich-Daun railway line (the Maare-Mosel-Bahn) with its Manderscheid-Pantenburg station. Today the Maare-Mosel-Radweg – a cycling path – runs through Pantenburg. A big carpark is provided here for cyclists. To the east runs the Autobahn A 1.
