= Manderscheid, Bernkastel-Wittlich =

Manderscheid
- Town
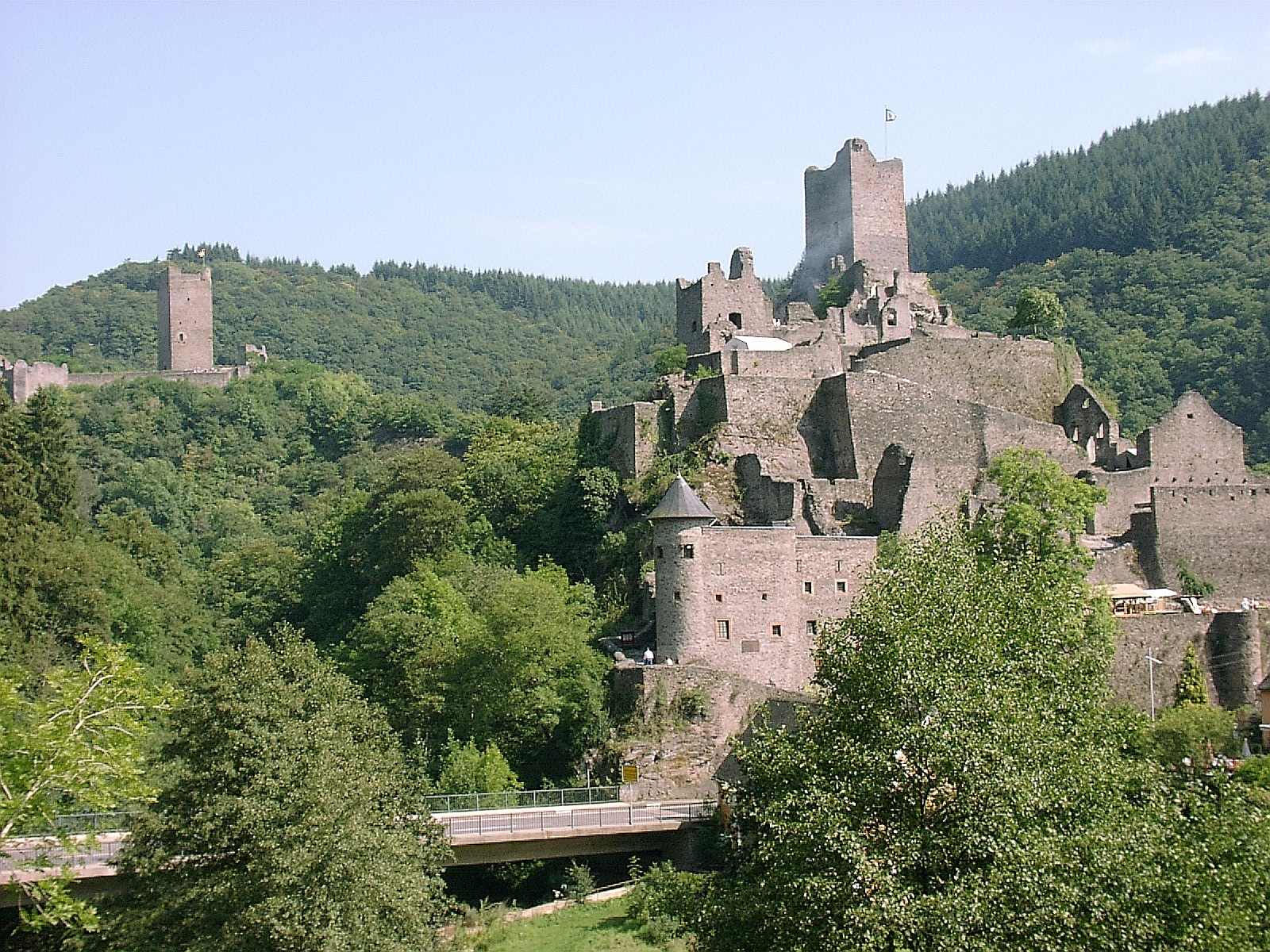
- Lower castle of Manderscheid

- Coat of arms

- Location of Manderscheid within Bernkastel-Wittlich district
- Interactive map of Manderscheid
- Location within Germany Location within Rhineland-Palatinate
- Coordinates: 50°05′31″N 06°48′33″E
- Country: Germany
- State: Rhineland-Palatinate
- District: Bernkastel-Wittlich
- Municipal assoc.: Wittlich-Land

Government
  - Mayor (2019–24): Günter Krämer

Area
  - Total: 10.06 km^{2} (3.88 sq mi)
- Elevation: 388 m (1,273 ft)

Population (2025-12-31)
  - Total: 1,450
  - Density: 144/km^{2} (373/sq mi)
- Time zone: UTC+01:00 (CET)
  - Summer (DST): UTC+02:00 (CEST)
- Dialling codes: 06572
- Vehicle registration: WIL
- Website: www.manderscheid.de

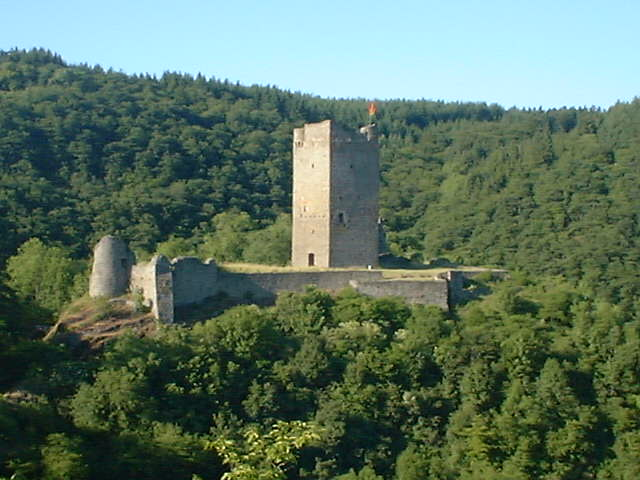
Ruins of the Oberburg

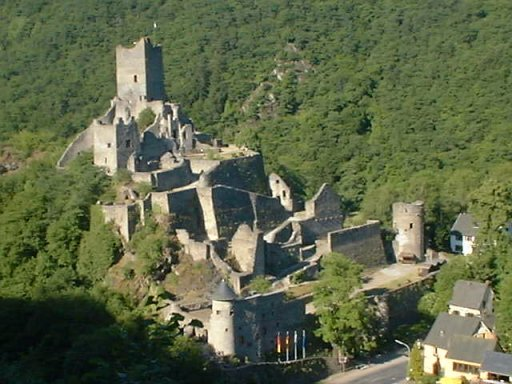
Ruins of the Niederburg

Manderscheid (German pronunciation: [ˈmandɐʃaɪt]; in Eifel dialect: Maanischd) is a town in the Bernkastel-Wittlich district in Rhineland-Palatinate, Germany, and also both a climatic spa and a Kneipp spa. Until 1 July 2014, when it became part of the Verbandsgemeinde Wittlich-Land, it was the seat of the former Verbandsgemeinde Manderscheid.

== Geography ==
=== Location ===
The town lies in the South Eifel between the rivers Lieser in the east and Kleine Kyll in the west. Northeast of Manderscheid lies the Bleckhausen Juniper Conservation Area, the biggest of its kind in the whole Eifel.

=== Climate ===
Yearly precipitation in Manderscheid averages from 823 mm (32.4 in) to 908 mm (35.7 in), which is high, falling into the highest fourth of the precipitation chart for all Germany. At 78% of the German Weather Service's weather stations, lower figures are recorded. The driest month is April. The most rainfall comes in December. In that month, precipitation is twice what it is in April. Precipitation varies moderately. At 52% of the weather stations, lower seasonal swings are recorded.

== History ==
=== Prehistory and antiquity ===
The first part of the placename Manderscheid is derived from the Celtic word mantara (pine), the second part from a Celtic word meaning 'forest'. The Manderscheid area was settled from very early times on. Near Schwarzenborn, several Stone Age settlements have been found. It is also known that near Mehren - only some miles away from Manderscheid - so many graves from Hallstatt times with many jewelled objects and tools have been unearthed that archaeologists and historians speak of a “Mehren culture”. Near Wallscheid, graves from Hallstatt and La Tène times have been found, too, and likewise near Laufeld. Near Wallscheid, two iron arrowheads that come from this era and a bronze vessel were found.

More numerous have been the finds from Roman times. Besides the “Villa of Bettenfeld”, which was unearthed in 1863 at the foot of the Mosenberg (mountain), Roman finds come to light in almost every town and village in the surrounding area.

In Dierfeld and Wallscheid, remnants of other such villas have been found, as have graves and urns in Laufeld, Manderscheid, Öfflingen, Pantenburg, Wallscheid, Großlittgen, Oberkail and Karl, as well as the odd coin.

Besides the Viergötterstein (a “four-god stone”, a pedestal on which a Jupiter Column was customarily stood), special attention is earned by two altars from Großlittgen that were found in Pantenburg in 1920. They were dedicated to the god Vovotius and the goddesses Boudina and Alauna and might have belonged to a Gallo-Roman spring sanctum.

This may make it clear that a great many settlements in the surrounding area arose as early as Roman times.

Rarer are finds from Frankish times, as they are almost everywhere.

In Pantenburg a lance, a spear and a shield were found, and in Eckfeld a sword and a ventail.

Despite the dearth of finds from this time, it can be assumed that there was considerably more settlement, and that most of today's population centres arose in that time, as witnessed by places with names ending in —scheid, —feld or —ingen. Thus, Officinus Villa (now Öfflingen) was mentioned in 794 and 895, Manderscheid and Eckiveld (Eckfeld) in 973, and Louvenvelt (Laufeld) in 1161.

=== Town’s history ===
Manderscheid, known in the Middle Ages as Manderschiet, had its first documentary mention in 973. From the mid 12th century it belonged to the Archbishop-Electorate of Trier. Elector Balduin granted it town rights in 1332. Manderscheid was the seat of an Electoral-Trier Amt and at the same time also of the counts of Manderscheid. Beginning in 1794, Manderscheid lay under French rule. In 1814 it was assigned to the Kingdom of Prussia at the Congress of Vienna. Since 1947, it has been part of the then newly founded state of Rhineland-Palatinate. The building of the former Electoral Kellnerei (a ministerial administrative establishment) today houses the seat of the Manderscheid Verbandsgemeinde administration.

The Luziakirche (“Lucia’s Church”), also known as Luciakapelle (“Lucia’s Chapel”) – presumably the town's first church – stood in the Middle Ages on Manderscheid's northern outskirts. In 1386, Lucia von Manderscheid, Heinrich von Manderscheid's wife, was entombed there. About 1794, the chapel was burnt down by the French. The former location is now forsaken, that is to say, no remnants of the chapel are on hand anymore. Only a street name recalls its existence. From the Luciakapelle comes the image of the Sorrowful Mother, which is today found in Saint Hubert's Parish Church (Pfarrkirche St. Hubertus). The pietà come from the time about 1600; when it underwent restoration in the 1960s, traces of burning were still in evidence.

On 7 June 1969, the municipality of Niedermanderscheid, until this time self-administering, was amalgamated with Manderscheid. Since 16 January 1998, Manderscheid has been a town.

== Politics ==
=== Town council ===
The council is made up of 16 council members, who were elected at the municipal election held on 7 June 2009, and the honorary mayor as chairman.

The municipal election held on 7 June 2009 yielded the following results:

Year	SPD	CDU	Forum	Total
2009	–	7	9	16 seats
2004	2	9	5	16 seats

=== Coat of arms ===
The town's arms might be described thus: Or a fess dancetty gules, the shield ensigned with a crown of the field.

=== Verbandsgemeinde of Manderscheid ===
The Verbandsgemeinde of Manderscheid was made up of almost the same individual municipalities as the old County of Manderscheid.

== Culture and sightseeing ==
Well known are Manderscheid's two castles, the Oberburg and the Niederburg. Also interesting to tourists are the gem grinding shop, the local history museum and the Maar Museum (about the Eifel's maars). Manderscheid lies on the river Lieser, which can be followed along the Eifel Club's trail, the Lieserpfad, to Daun or Wittlich. Moreover, the 330 km-long “premium” hiking trail, the Eifelsteig, leads through Manderscheid on its way from Aachen to Trier.

=== Manderscheider Platt ===
Maanischder Platt with Carlo Padilla at the Maarmuseum

The traditional local speech is among the Moselle Franconian dialects. Besides some words that are not found in standard High German, there are the following peculiarities:

- The ch after the vowels e and i such as in Milch ([ç]) does not exist. It is replaced with sch ([ʃ]).
- Some voiced consonants are replaced with their unvoiced counterparts: Blut becomes Ploot, Glaube becomes Klowen.
- The a ([a]) is spoken open and broad as in Wääsch and Frääsch ([ɛː]).
- ei is pronounced like ai.
- The consonant cluster rt ([ʁt]) is pronounced cht ([xt]): thus Ort becomes Ocht.

== Economy and infrastructure ==
Until the mid-19th century, the Manderscheider Maß was the name given a standard dry measure in gristmills along the Lieser, Salm, and Kleine Kyll (one was equal to 221.15 L). The so-called Malter-Maß was not the same everywhere, but rather varied regionally. The Manderscheider Maß was decreed in a Mühlenordnung (“mill order”) on 20 October 1736 by Prince-Archbishop-Elector Franz-Georg, and was valid for the whole of the Electorate of Trier.

=== Transport ===
Manderscheid lies on the Autobahn A 1.

== Famous people ==
- Michael Siefener (b. 1961), writer and translator, lives in Manderscheid
- Wolfgang Leonhard (1921–2014), writer, publicist, historian and one of the leading authorities on the former Soviet Union and Communism, lived in Manderscheid
