= Eisenschmitt =

- Municipality
- Coat of arms

- Location of Eisenschmitt within Bernkastel-Wittlich district
- Interactive map of Eisenschmitt
- Location within Germany Location within Rhineland-Palatinate
- Coordinates: 50°2′36″N 6°43′16″E
- Country: Germany
- State: Rhineland-Palatinate
- District: Bernkastel-Wittlich
- Municipal assoc.: Wittlich-Land

Government
  - Mayor (2019–24): Rainer Steilen

Area
  - Total: 10.84 km^{2} (4.19 sq mi)
- Elevation: 320 m (1,050 ft)

Population (2025-12-31)
  - Total: 338
  - Density: 31.2/km^{2} (80.8/sq mi)
- Time zone: UTC+01:00 (CET)
  - Summer (DST): UTC+02:00 (CEST)
- Postal codes: 54533
- Dialling codes: 06567
- Vehicle registration: WIL
- Website: www.eisenschmitt.de

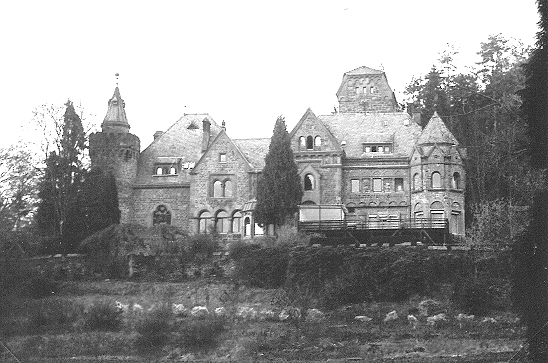
Jagdschloss Eisenschmitt

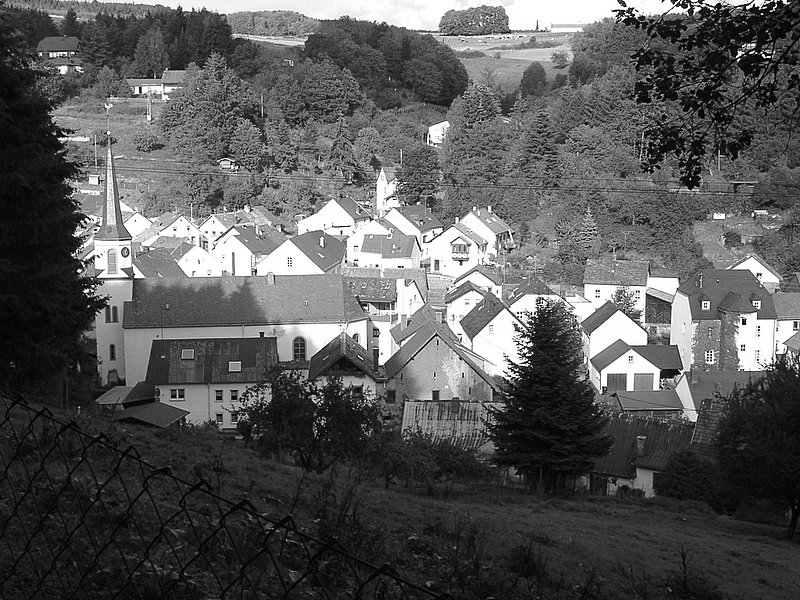
Eisenschmitt's centre

Eisenschmitt is an Ortsgemeinde – a municipality belonging to a Verbandsgemeinde, a kind of collective municipality – in the Bernkastel-Wittlich district in Rhineland-Palatinate, Germany.

== Geography ==
=== Location ===
Eisenschmitt lies on the river Salm. It belongs to the Verbandsgemeinde Wittlich-Land.

=== Constituent communities ===
Eisenschmitt's Ortsteile are Eisenschmitt and the outlying centre of Eichelhütte, lying down the Salm. Not much farther downstream stands Himmerod Abbey, which is within Großlittgen’s municipal limits.

== History ==
In 1372, Eisenschmitt had its first documentary mention as Yssensmyt uff der Salmen. The plentiful iron ore deposits, the production of charcoal in the surrounding woods to fire the furnaces and the feasibility of using the Salm’s waterpower for smelting were great enough to run ironworks for a long time. This in turn brought about the settlement of ironworkers and thereby the founding and growth of a village.

Beginning in 1794, Eisenschmitt lay under French rule. In 1814 it was assigned to the Kingdom of Prussia at the Congress of Vienna. In 1835, Eisenschmitt had roughly 1,350 inhabitants, the highest population figure in its history. As the 19th century wore on, however, an end was brought to the iron industry in the Salm valley by new production processes and more productive as well as bigger ironworks in the industrial areas on the Lower Rhine and the Ruhr, which moreover could be worked with the more economical coal instead of with charcoal.

Since 1947, Eisenschmitt has been part of the then newly founded state of Rhineland-Palatinate.

=== The name Eisenschmitt ===
The name “Eisenschmitt” comes from the now forsaken ironworking industry (Eisen is German for “iron”), which had its beginnings in the 14th century. The ironworks in Eichelhütte was founded in 1701.

== Politics ==
=== Municipal council ===
The council is made up of 8 council members, who were elected by majority vote at the municipal election held on 7 June 2009, and the honorary mayor as chairman.

=== Coat of arms ===
The German blazon reads: Gespalten von Gold durch eine eingebogene rote Spitze, darin ein silbernes Gemerke der verschlungenen Buchstaben I und S, vorne ein roter Sparrbalken, hinten schräggekreuzt schwarzer Hammer und schwarze Zange.

The municipality's arms might in English heraldic language be described thus: Tierced in mantle, dexter Or a fess dancetty gules, sinister Or a hammer and tongs per saltire sable, and in base gules the letters I and S interlaced argent.

The symbol made of the two interlocking letters I and S stands for “Isen-Schmitt”, the old Eisenschmitt foundry mark from the 16th century. The tinctures gules and argent (red and silver) are the Malbergs’, under whose lordship Eisenschmitt lay until feudal times came to an end. The horizontal zigzag stripe (“fess dancetty”) on the dexter (armsbearer's right, viewer's left) side is the sign of the old County of Manderscheid and a reference to the village's former allegiance thereto. On the sinister (armsbearer's left, viewer's right) side are a hammer and tongs, symbols of the iron industry that lasted centuries, and from which the municipality also got its name.

== “Das Weiberdorf” ==
The municipality of Eisenschmitt served the writer Clara Viebig (1860-1952) as a model for her novel Das Weiberdorf (“The Women’s Village” or “The Village of Women”), which describes life in the small community of “Eifelschmitt”. The novel's background is a peculiarity of the village community: Owing to the increasing dearth of the raw material, iron ore, in the area around Eisenschmitt, those men capable of working became guestworkers in the Ruhr area towards the end of the 19th century. They earned a living for themselves and their families in the emerging steelworks. The women stayed back, and during their husbands’ long absence, they had to do all the work in the house and in the fields, hence the novel's name. The description of these conditions was perceived by many of the writer's contemporaries as scandalous, the women taking on a rôle that then was not commonly customary.

Scenes from the novel are displayed on the village fountain before the church.

Since June 2005, the Clara-Viebig-Zentrum (centre) in Eisenschmitt has memorialized the writer.

== Culture and sightseeing ==
- Eisenschmitter Brunnen
- Clara-Viebig-Zentrum
