= Gipperath =

- Municipality
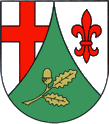
- Coat of arms

- Location of Gipperath within Bernkastel-Wittlich district
- Interactive map of Gipperath
- Location within Germany Location within Rhineland-Palatinate
- Coordinates: 50°02′22″N 6°51′47″E
- Country: Germany
- State: Rhineland-Palatinate
- District: Bernkastel-Wittlich
- Municipal assoc.: Wittlich-Land

Government
  - Mayor (2019–24): Hans-Leo Schäfer

Area
  - Total: 4.87 km^{2} (1.88 sq mi)
- Elevation: 370 m (1,210 ft)

Population (2025-12-31)
  - Total: 229
  - Density: 47.0/km^{2} (122/sq mi)
- Time zone: UTC+01:00 (CET)
  - Summer (DST): UTC+02:00 (CEST)
- Postal codes: 54533
- Dialling codes: 06574
- Vehicle registration: WIL

Gipperath is an Ortsgemeinde – a municipality belonging to a Verbandsgemeinde, a kind of collective municipality – in the Bernkastel-Wittlich district in Rhineland-Palatinate, Germany.

== Geography ==
=== Location ===
The municipality lies in the Vulkaneifel. The municipal area is 42% wooded. The nearest forest is called Geisbüch. Gipperath belongs to the Verbandsgemeinde Wittlich-Land. Its elevation is 370 m above sea level.

=== Neighbouring municipalities ===
To the northeast, about 3 km away, is Niederöfflingen, about 4 km to the southeast is Plein, and lying 3 km to the southwest is Schladt.

== History ==
In 1098, Gipperath had its first documentary mention as Gevenrothe at Saint Simeon’s Foundation in Trier. The village already had a church at its disposal in the 12th century. Beginning in 1794, Gipperath lay under French rule. In 1814 it was assigned to the Kingdom of Prussia at the Congress of Vienna. In June 1908, the first telephone service reached the village, in May 1913 came the watermain and in December 1920, the electrical supply came into service. Since 1947, Gipperath has been part of the then newly founded state of Rhineland-Palatinate.

== Politics ==
=== Municipal council ===
The council is made up of 6 council members, who were elected by majority vote at the municipal election held on 7 June 2009, and the honorary mayor as chairman.

=== Mayors ===
The mayor is Hans-Leo Schäfer, who in 1996 succeeded Alfred Oster.

=== Coat of arms ===
The municipality’s arms might be described thus: Tierced in mantle, dexter argent a cross gules, sinister argent a fleur-de-lis of the second, and in base vert an oak sprig bendwise sinister Or fructed of one.

=== Town partnerships ===
Gipperath fosters partnerships with the following places:

- (France) Beuvillers, Calvados

Every other year there are exchange visits between Gipperath and Beuvillers.

== Culture and sightseeing ==
Worth seeing are the oak grove (a short way before the entrance to the village, visible from greater distances), the Gipperath Mill, the barrows, the 16th-century church and the cross with Saint Quirinus on it, to whom the church is also consecrated and whose patronage is celebrated on 30 April, his feast day. In the church is found an altar that replaced a simple wooden table in the 1990s. On the front wall is an emblem with a cross. This cross displays the twelve tribes of the Apostles. Behind the stone slab are fingerbones, kept as relics.

== Economy and infrastructure ==
To the east runs the Autobahn A 1, and to the south the A 60.
