= Arenrath =

- Municipality
- Coat of arms

- Location of Arenrath within Bernkastel-Wittlich district
- Interactive map of Arenrath
- Location within Germany Location within Rhineland-Palatinate
- Coordinates: 49°57′17″N 06°44′29″E
- Country: Germany
- State: Rhineland-Palatinate
- District: Bernkastel-Wittlich
- Municipal assoc.: Wittlich-Land

Government
  - Mayor (2019–24): Ludwig Schmitz

Area
  - Total: 6.77 km^{2} (2.61 sq mi)
- Elevation: 265 m (869 ft)

Population (2025-12-31)
  - Total: 372
  - Density: 54.9/km^{2} (142/sq mi)
- Time zone: UTC+01:00 (CET)
  - Summer (DST): UTC+02:00 (CEST)
- Postal codes: 54518
- Dialling codes: 06575
- Vehicle registration: WIL
- Website: www.arenrath.eu

Arenrath is an Ortsgemeinde – a municipality belonging to a Verbandsgemeinde, a kind of collective municipality – in the Bernkastel-Wittlich district in Rhineland-Palatinate, Germany.

== Geography ==
=== Location ===
The municipality lies in the Eifel some 13 km west of the district seat of Wittlich, between Bruch and Binsfeld. It belongs to the Verbandsgemeinde of Wittlich-Land, whose seat is in Wittlich, although that town is itself not in the Verbandsgemeinde.

=== Geology ===
Arenrath is known for the Moselle agate stones that come from the local gravel quarries.

== History ==
In the Middle Ages, Arenrath, which had its first documentary mention as Arendroch in 1156, formed its own lordly domain within the Electorate of Trier.

== Politics ==
=== Municipal council ===
The council is made up of 8 council members, who were elected by majority vote at the municipal election held on 7 June 2009, and the honorary mayor as chairman.

=== Mayor ===
The mayor (Ortsbürgermeister) is Ludwig Schmitz.

=== Coat of arms ===
The German blazon reads: Wappen von rechtem silbernem Stufenbalken geteilt, oben in Grün links 3 goldene Ähren, unten in Rot ein silberner Ärmel mit silberner Hand, die eine goldene Schale hält.

The municipality’s arms might in English heraldic language be described thus: A demibar in sinister and another in dexter enhanced, the two joined between the honour and fess points with a pallet couped at these points, all argent, in chief vert, sinister three ears of wheat Or conjoined at the stems, in base gules an arm couped below the shoulder, vested and embowed, the hand to dexter, all of the first, the hand holding a bowl of the third.

The escutcheon’s silver parting (described in the German blazon as a Stufenbalken, and apparently having no equivalent in English heraldic language) and the begging bowl are said to be references to the local church’s patron saint, Alexius, who is represented in legend as a beggar under a staircase. The wheat ears stand for agriculture and the field tincture vert (green) is a reference to the municipality’s name, Arenrath, which itself refers to “Arend’s clearing”. Green stands for woods and fields while the gules-argent (red-silver) combination is a reference to the village’s former allegiance to the Electorate of Trier.

Arenrath was granted the right to bear its own arms in 1982.

== Culture and sightseeing ==
There is a natural monument in the so-called Teufelsstein ("Devil’s Rock"), a sandstone boulder that lies near the municipal limit between Bruch and Arenrath.
