= Oberöfflingen =

- Municipality
- Location of Oberöfflingen within Bernkastel-Wittlich district
- Interactive map of Oberöfflingen
- Location within Germany Location within Rhineland-Palatinate
- Coordinates: 50°04′05″N 6°52′13″E
- Country: Germany
- State: Rhineland-Palatinate
- District: Bernkastel-Wittlich
- Municipal assoc.: Wittlich-Land

Government
  - Mayor (2019–24): Martin Schlimpen

Area
  - Total: 7.44 km^{2} (2.87 sq mi)
- Elevation: 400 m (1,300 ft)

Population (2025-12-31)
  - Total: 280
  - Density: 38/km^{2} (97/sq mi)
- Time zone: UTC+01:00 (CET)
  - Summer (DST): UTC+02:00 (CEST)
- Postal codes: 54533
- Dialling codes: 06572
- Vehicle registration: WIL
- Website: www.oberoefflingen.de

Oberöfflingen is an Ortsgemeinde – a municipality belonging to a Verbandsgemeinde, a kind of collective municipality – in the Bernkastel-Wittlich district in Rhineland-Palatinate, Germany.

== Geography ==
=== Location ===
The municipality lies on the edge of the Lieser valley in the Eifel. Oberöfflingen belongs to the Verbandsgemeinde Wittlich-Land.

=== Neighbouring municipalities ===
Oberöfflingen borders in the north on Laufeld, in the southeast on Niederöfflingen and in the southwest on Schladt.

== History ==
In 785, Oberöfflingen had its first documentary mention as Uffeningen. Beginning in 1794, Oberöfflingen lay under French rule. In 1814 it was assigned to the Kingdom of Prussia at the Congress of Vienna. Since 1947, it has been part of the then newly founded state of Rhineland-Palatinate.

== Politics ==
=== Municipal council ===
The council is made up of 6 council members, who were elected by majority vote at the municipal election held on 7 June 2009, and the honorary mayor as chairman.

=== Coat of arms ===
Oberöfflingen's arms

The German blazon reads: Von Rot über Silber geteilt, oben ein silbernes Glevenkreuz, unten drei rote Schrägbalken.

The municipality's arms might in English heraldic language be described thus: Per fess, gules a cross flory argent and bendy of seven of the second and the first.

The arms were designed by Karl E. Becker. The "cross flory" (that is, cross with lilylike ends to its arms) is the heraldic device borne by the Abbey of Echternach, which figures prominently in the village's mediaeval history. Carloman donated the village to the Abbey, a deed later confirmed by Charlemagne. A surviving impression of a seal borne by Heinrich von Ufflingen – Ufflingen being an old form of the name (Ober)Öfflingen – from 1451 shows the same “bendy” (that is, with slanted stripes) pattern now seen in the lower half of the escutcheon.

The arms have been borne since 14 October 1982 when they were approved by the Regierungsbezirk administration.

== Culture and sightseeing ==
Saint Maurice’s Church (Kirche St. Mauritius) comes from the year 1854. One can also still visit the ruins of the Biederburg (castle).

== Famous people ==
- Gertrud Pesch (Abbess of Oberschönenfeld Abbey)
