= Niersbach =

- Municipality
- Coat of arms

- Location of Niersbach within Bernkastel-Wittlich district
- Interactive map of Niersbach
- Location within Germany Location within Rhineland-Palatinate
- Coordinates: 49°56′25″N 6°44′33″E
- Country: Germany
- State: Rhineland-Palatinate
- District: Bernkastel-Wittlich
- Municipal assoc.: Wittlich-Land

Government
  - Mayor (2019–24): Hans-Josef Weirich

Area
  - Total: 12.81 km^{2} (4.95 sq mi)
- Elevation: 280 m (920 ft)

Population (2025-12-31)
  - Total: 712
  - Density: 55.6/km^{2} (144/sq mi)
- Time zone: UTC+01:00 (CET)
  - Summer (DST): UTC+02:00 (CEST)
- Postal codes: 54518
- Dialling codes: 06508, 06575
- Vehicle registration: WIL

Niersbach is an Ortsgemeinde – a municipality belonging to a Verbandsgemeinde, a kind of collective municipality – in the Bernkastel-Wittlich district in Rhineland-Palatinate, Germany.

== Geography ==
=== Location ===
The municipality lies in the Eifel and belongs to the Verbandsgemeinde of Wittlich-Land, whose seat is in Wittlich, although that town is itself not in the Verbandsgemeinde.

=== Constituent communities ===
Niersbach has one outlying centre, the Ortsteil of Greverath.

== History ==
In 1473, Niersbach had its first documentary mention as Nydersbach. Beginning in 1794, Niersbach lay under French rule. In 1814 it was assigned to the Kingdom of Prussia at the Congress of Vienna. Since 1947, it has been part of the then newly founded state of Rhineland-Palatinate. Today's municipality was newly formed out of the dissolved municipalities of Niersbach and Greverath on 10 June 1979.

== Politics ==
=== Municipal council ===
The council is made up of 12 council members, who were elected by proportional representation at the municipal election held on 7 June 2009, and the honorary mayor as chairman.

The municipal election held on 7 June 2009 yielded the following results:

Year	WG Krumeich	WG Becker	FWG Greverath	Total
2009	3	7	2	12 seats

=== Coat of arms ===
The German blazon reads: In Silber über grünem Wellenschildfuß eine blaue Töpferscheibe, beseitet von je einer roten Flamme, darüber ein blauer Topf.

The municipality's arms might in English heraldic language be described thus: Over a base wavy vert argent a potter's wheel on which a pot, both azure, between two flames gules.
