= Oberscheidweiler =

- Municipality
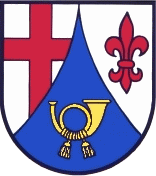
- Coat of arms

- Location of Oberscheidweiler within Bernkastel-Wittlich district
- Interactive map of Oberscheidweiler
- Location within Germany Location within Rhineland-Palatinate
- Coordinates: 50°4′26.88″N 6°56′3.65″E
- Country: Germany
- State: Rhineland-Palatinate
- District: Bernkastel-Wittlich
- Municipal assoc.: Wittlich-Land

Government
  - Mayor (2019–24): Mark Rosenbaum

Area
  - Total: 4.50 km^{2} (1.74 sq mi)
- Elevation: 370 m (1,210 ft)

Population (2025-12-31)
  - Total: 181
  - Density: 40.2/km^{2} (104/sq mi)
- Time zone: UTC+01:00 (CET)
  - Summer (DST): UTC+02:00 (CEST)
- Postal codes: 54533
- Dialling codes: 06574
- Vehicle registration: WIL

Oberscheidweiler is an Ortsgemeinde – a municipality belonging to a Verbandsgemeinde, a kind of collective municipality – in the Bernkastel-Wittlich district in Rhineland-Palatinate, Germany.

== Geography ==
=== Location ===
The municipality lies in the Eifel, indeed on the edge of the Vulkaneifel, on a high plateau between the Alf and Sammetbach valleys. Oberscheidweiler belongs to the Verbandsgemeinde Wittlich-Land.

=== Neighbouring municipalities ===
Oberscheidweiler borders in the south on Niederscheidweiler, in the west on Hasborn and in the north on Mückeln.

== History ==
In 1144, Oberscheidweiler had its first documentary mention as Scheida. Since the 17th century, the name Oberscheidweiler has been customary. Beginning in 1794, Oberscheidweiler lay under French rule. In 1814 it was assigned to the Kingdom of Prussia at the Congress of Vienna. Since 1947, it has been part of the then newly founded state of Rhineland-Palatinate.

== Politics ==
=== Municipal council ===
The council is made up of 6 council members, who were elected by majority vote at the municipal election held on 7 June 2009, and the honorary mayor as chairman.

=== Coat of arms ===
The municipality's arms might be described thus: Tierced in mantle, dexter argent a cross gules, sinister argent a fleur-de-lis of the second, and in base azure a post horn Or, the bell to sinister.

The cross on the dexter (armsbearer's right, viewer's left) side refers to Oberscheidweiler's centuries-long allegiance to the Electorate of Trier. The lily on the sinister (armsbearer's left, viewer's right) side stands for Springiersbach Abbey, for which Emperor Henry IV issued a certificate of confirmation. This led to, among many other things, Oberscheidweiler's mention in 1193 as Scheitwilre. The post horn appears as a charge for a more straightforward reason: Oberscheidweiler lay on the old postal route from Trier to Koblenz, known to have been run by the Princely house of Thurn und Taxis in 1840.

Oberscheidweiler was granted the right to bear its own arms on 7 January 1993.

== Economy and infrastructure ==
To the west runs the Autobahn A 1. In Wittlich is a railway station on the Koblenz-Trier railway line.
