= Wittlich-Land =

- Verbandsgemeinde
- Location of Wittlich-Land within Bernkastel-Wittlich district
- Interactive map of Wittlich-Land
- Location within Germany Location within Rhineland-Palatinate
- Coordinates: 49°59′N 6°53′E
- Country: Germany
- State: Rhineland-Palatinate
- District: Bernkastel-Wittlich
- Seat: Wittlich
- Subdivisions: 45 municipalities

Area
  - Total: 397.75 km^{2} (153.57 sq mi)

Population (2025-12-31)
  - Total: 31,461
  - Density: 79.097/km^{2} (204.86/sq mi)
- Time zone: UTC+01:00 (CET)
  - Summer (DST): UTC+02:00 (CEST)
- Website: www.vg-wittlich-land.de

Wittlich-Land is a Verbandsgemeinde ("collective municipality") in the district Bernkastel-Wittlich, in Rhineland-Palatinate, Germany. It is located around the town Wittlich, which is the seat of Wittlich-Land, but not part of the Verbandsgemeinde. On 1 July 2014 it was expanded with the municipalities of the former Verbandsgemeinde Manderscheid.

Wittlich-Land consists of the following Ortsgemeinden ("local municipalities"):

1. Altrich
2. Arenrath
3. Bergweiler
4. Bettenfeld
5. Binsfeld
6. Bruch
7. Dierfeld
8. Dierscheid
9. Dodenburg
10. Dreis
11. Eckfeld
12. Eisenschmitt
13. Esch
14. Gipperath
15. Gladbach
16. Greimerath
17. Großlittgen
18. Hasborn
19. Heckenmünster
20. Heidweiler
21. Hetzerath
22. Hupperath
23. Karl
24. Klausen
25. Landscheid
26. Laufeld
27. Manderscheid
28. Meerfeld
29. Minderlittgen
30. Musweiler
31. Niederöfflingen
32. Niederscheidweiler
33. Niersbach
34. Oberöfflingen
35. Oberscheidweiler
36. Osann-Monzel
37. Pantenburg
38. Platten
39. Plein
40. Rivenich
41. Salmtal
42. Schladt
43. Schwarzenborn
44. Sehlem
45. Wallscheid
