= Minderlittgen =

- Municipality
- Coat of arms

- Location of Minderlittgen within Bernkastel-Wittlich district
- Interactive map of Minderlittgen
- Location within Germany Location within Rhineland-Palatinate
- Coordinates: 50°00′35″N 6°50′24″E
- Country: Germany
- State: Rhineland-Palatinate
- District: Bernkastel-Wittlich
- Municipal assoc.: Wittlich-Land

Government
  - Mayor (2019–24): Helmut Bauer

Area
  - Total: 8.19 km^{2} (3.16 sq mi)
- Elevation: 348 m (1,142 ft)

Population (2025-12-31)
  - Total: 724
  - Density: 88.4/km^{2} (229/sq mi)
- Time zone: UTC+01:00 (CET)
  - Summer (DST): UTC+02:00 (CEST)
- Postal codes: 54518
- Dialling codes: 06571
- Vehicle registration: WIL
- Website: www.minderlittgen.de

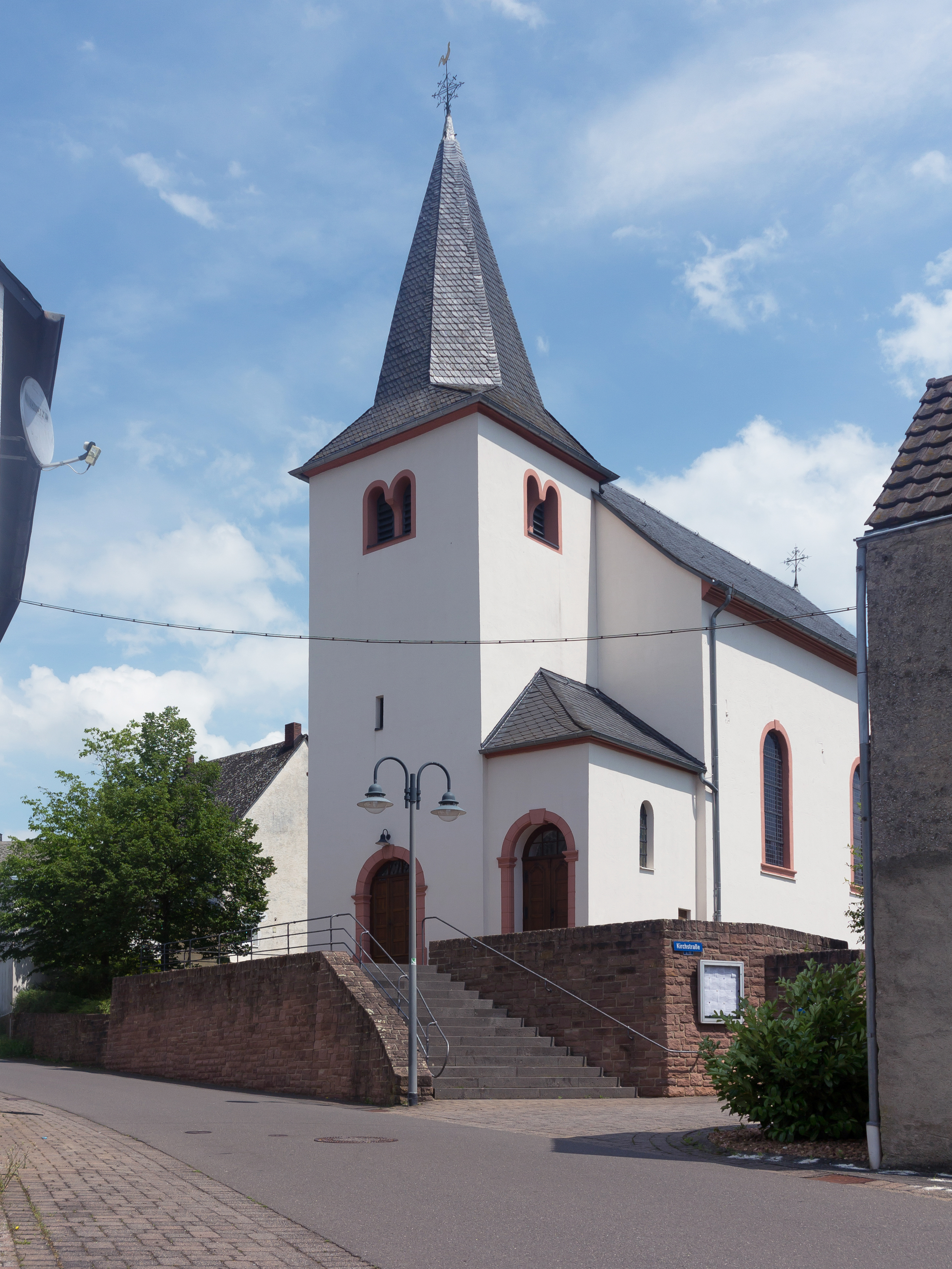
Minderlittgen, catholic church: Filialkirche Sankt Maria, Simon und Judas

Minderlittgen (in Eifel dialect: Mannerleehtchen) is an Ortsgemeinde – a municipality belonging to a Verbandsgemeinde, a kind of collective municipality – in the Bernkastel-Wittlich district in Rhineland-Palatinate, Germany.

== Geography ==
The municipality lies in the Eifel and belongs to the Verbandsgemeinde of Wittlich-Land, whose seat is in Wittlich, although that town is itself not in the Verbandsgemeinde.

== History ==
In 912, Minderlittgen had its first documentary mention as Lutiaco from King Karl III. The placename's base form is Lutiacum. Over the ages, it has had many names:

- 912 Lutiaco
- 1152 Minoris Lideche
- 1330 Minre-Lyethge
- 1503 Minnerlietge
- 1569 Minderlietigh
- 1728 Minderlötig

Until 1147, St. Maximin's Abbey was the landholder in Minderlittgen. Thereafter the village was held by the Electorate of Trier. Beginning in 1794, Minderlittgen lay under French rule. In 1814 it was assigned to the Kingdom of Prussia at the Congress of Vienna. Since 1947, it has been part of the then newly founded state of Rhineland-Palatinate.

== Politics ==
=== Municipal council ===
The council is made up of 12 council members, who were elected by proportional representation at the municipal election held on 7 June 2009, and the honorary mayor as chairman.

The municipal election held on 7 June 2009 yielded the following results:

Year	CDU	WG Bauer	WG Nober	WG Hecking	Gesamt
2009	2	5	1	4	12 seats

=== Coat of arms ===
The municipality's arms might be described thus: Per pale argent a cross gules surmounted by a fleur-de-lis of the field and argent two pallets gules and a canton azure.

== Culture and sightseeing ==
=== Clubs ===
The municipality of Minderlittgen currently has a volunteer fire brigade, a music club, a men's singing club (together with Hupperath), a sport club (Spielvereinigung Minderlittgen-Hupperath e. V.), a tennis club, a church choir, a Möhnen club (association of women who participate in the festivities on Fat Thursday, or Weiberfastnacht) and a church building club at its disposal.

=== Regular events ===
- Kappensitzung: a Carnival event staged by the music and sport clubs.
- Möhnensitzung: a Carnival event staged by the Möhnen club.
- Carnival parade on Shrove Tuesday
- Sportfest, staged by the sport club (in Hupperath)
- Kermis with music club's concert evening
