= Greimerath, Bernkastel-Wittlich =

Greimerath
- Municipality
- Coat of arms

- Location of Greimerath within Bernkastel-Wittlich district
- Interactive map of Greimerath
- Location within Germany Location within Rhineland-Palatinate
- Coordinates: 50°02′25.20″N 06°54′29.35″E
- Country: Germany
- State: Rhineland-Palatinate
- District: Bernkastel-Wittlich
- Municipal assoc.: Wittlich-Land

Government
  - Mayor (2019–24): Gerhard Bastgen

Area
  - Total: 3.76 km^{2} (1.45 sq mi)
- Elevation: 380 m (1,250 ft)

Population (2025-12-31)
  - Total: 286
  - Density: 76.1/km^{2} (197/sq mi)
- Time zone: UTC+01:00 (CET)
  - Summer (DST): UTC+02:00 (CEST)
- Postal codes: 54533
- Dialling codes: 06574
- Vehicle registration: WIL
- Website: www.greimerath.de

Greimerath (German pronunciation: [ˈɡʁaɪməʁaːt]) is an Ortsgemeinde – a municipality belonging to a Verbandsgemeinde, a kind of collective municipality – in the Bernkastel-Wittlich district in Rhineland-Palatinate, Germany.

== Geography ==
The municipality lies in the Eifel. The municipal area is 52% wooded. To the east runs the Autobahn A 1. Greimerath belongs to the Verbandsgemeinde Wittlich-Land.

== History ==
In 1144, Greimerath had its first documentary mention. Beginning in 1794, Greimerath lay under French rule. In 1814 it was assigned to the Kingdom of Prussia at the Congress of Vienna. Since 1947, it has been part of the then newly founded state of Rhineland-Palatinate.

== Politics ==
=== Municipal council ===
The council is made up of 6 council members, who were elected by majority vote at the municipal election held on 7 June 2009, and the honorary mayor as chairman.

=== Coat of arms ===
The municipality's arms might be described thus: Per fess sable a demi-dragon argent armed and langued gules, and argent two adzes in saltire azure.

== Culture and sightseeing ==
The church comes from the year 1760. Beside the Baroque church stands the rectory with its accompanying garden. In 2005, the rectory (without the garden) was sold into private ownership. The parish priest for the parishes of Greimerath, Laufeld and Niederöfflingen lives at the rectory in Laufeld.

The parish garden was converted by the specially founded Cultural Club into a meeting, recreational and cultural place. A signpost on the nearby cycle path lures many cyclists and hikers into this garden with its native herbs and plants. A fountain, an outdoor chess set and many places to sit offer all visitors a chance to recover from everyday stresses.
