= Bruch, Rhineland-Palatinate =

Bruch
- Municipality
- Coat of arms

- Location of Bruch within Bernkastel-Wittlich district
- Interactive map of Bruch
- Location within Germany Location within Rhineland-Palatinate
- Coordinates: 49°57′25″N 06°47′05″E
- Country: Germany
- State: Rhineland-Palatinate
- District: Bernkastel-Wittlich
- Municipal assoc.: Wittlich-Land

Government
  - Mayor (2019–24): Walter Schmitz

Area
  - Total: 8.64 km^{2} (3.34 sq mi)
- Elevation: 190 m (620 ft)

Population (2025-12-31)
  - Total: 498
  - Density: 57.6/km^{2} (149/sq mi)
- Time zone: UTC+01:00 (CET)
  - Summer (DST): UTC+02:00 (CEST)
- Postal codes: 54518
- Dialling codes: 06578
- Vehicle registration: WIL
- Website: www.bruch-eifel.de

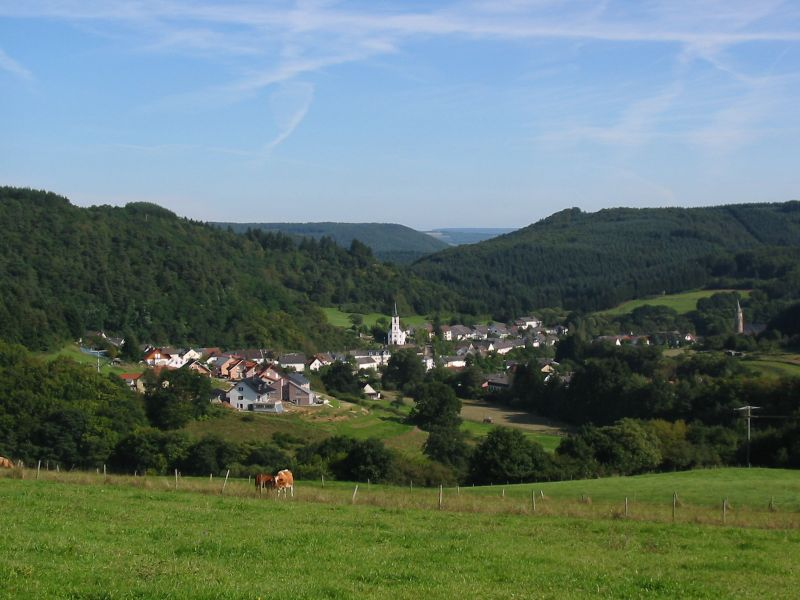
Bruch

Bruch (German pronunciation: [bʁʊx]) is an Ortsgemeinde – a municipality belonging to a Verbandsgemeinde, a kind of collective municipality – in the Bernkastel-Wittlich district in Rhineland-Palatinate, Germany.

== Geography ==
The municipality lies in the Eifel on the long-distance hiking trail, the Eifelsteig, some 10 km west of the district seat, Wittlich, at an elevation of 190 m above sea level. Bruch also lies on both sides of the river Salm. It belongs to the Verbandsgemeinde of Wittlich-Land, whose seat is in Wittlich, although that town is itself not in the Verbandsgemeinde.

== History ==
Bruch's beginnings are believed to reach all the way back to Roman times. Finds and remains such as a Roman graveyard, for instance, are clues to this.

In 1138, Bruch had its first documentary mention in the name Fridelo de Brucha, who cropped up in the Himmerod Monastery's founding document. Until this Family “von Bruch” died out about 1334, the village's history was tightly bound to this family's. After their days had ended, the lordship passed to Dietrich von Dune (Daun).

In the 16th century, Bruch was granted its own jurisdiction. The gallows that came along with this stood on the so-called Galgenberg (“Gallows Mountain”) east of the castle, on an old linking road to Bergweiler.

In the 18th century, the village's geographical situation as outlined above led to a rather odd situation: The village belonged to two separate states, as the lands west of the Salm were part of the Duchy of Luxembourg and those lying east of the river belonged to the Electorate of Trier

As of 1794, though, the whole of Bruch lay under French rule. In 1815, the village was assigned to the Kingdom of Prussia at the Congress of Vienna. Since 1946, it has been part of the then newly founded state of Rhineland-Palatinate.

== Politics ==
=== Municipal council ===
The council is made up of 8 council members, who were elected by majority vote at the municipal election held on 7 June 2009, and the honorary mayor as chairman.

=== Coat of arms ===
The German blazon reads: Schild, von oben links nach unten rechts sechsmal von Gold und Rot schräggeteilt, belegt mit einem silbernen Burgturm mit blauem Dach und zwei blauen Fenstern.

The municipality's arms might in English heraldic language be described thus: Bendy of six Or and gules, a castle argent with roofs and windows azure.

The castle is, of course, the local one, the Brucher Burg, and the diagonal-stripe pattern (“bendy”) was the arms borne by the noble Lords of Bruch, who lived at the castle, their family seat, in the first half of the 12th century.

Bruch was granted the right to bear its own arms in 1983.

== Culture and sightseeing ==
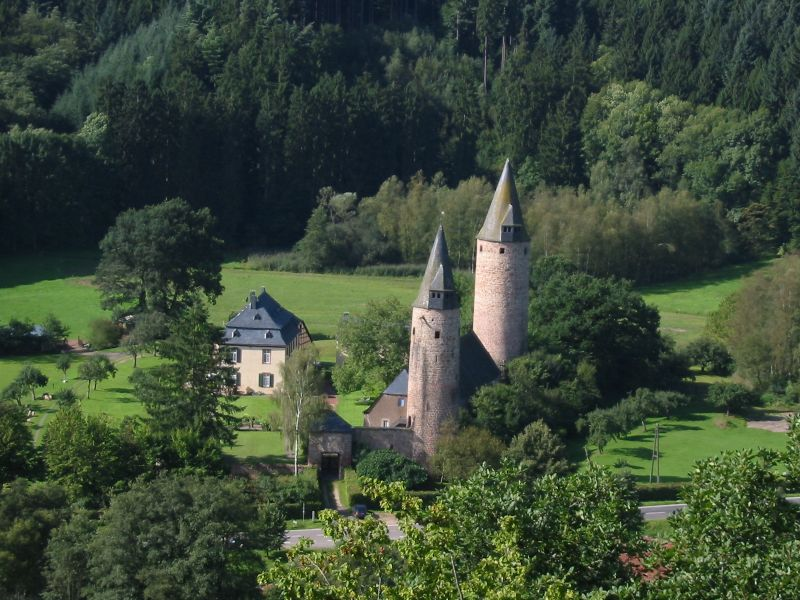
Brucher Burg

=== Moated castle ===
The moated castle in Bruch, standing in a hollow surrounded by wooded hills on the Salm, dates in its older parts from the early 14th century, and was the seat of the Lords of Bruch, who are witnessed beginning in the 12th century. Today the castle is under private ownership.

=== Further points of interest ===
- Burghaus (Hepgesburg) (1413)
- Oilmill (from the 19th century, established at one of the oldest mills on the Salm, from 1284)
- Potter's workshop with an old kiln from the 17th century
- Saint Roch’s Parish Church (Pfarrkirche St. Rochus, built in 1807)
- Disused copper mine from 1740
- Galgenberg (“Gallows Mountain”), old execution site
- Burgstraße 6, sandstone figures and reliefs
