= Dreis =

- Municipality
- Coat of arms

- Location of Dreis within Bernkastel-Wittlich district
- Interactive map of Dreis
- Location within Germany Location within Rhineland-Palatinate
- Coordinates: 49°56′27.63″N 06°49′2.20″E
- Country: Germany
- State: Rhineland-Palatinate
- District: Bernkastel-Wittlich
- Municipal assoc.: Wittlich-Land

Government
  - Mayor (2019–24): Christoph Berthold Thieltges

Area
  - Total: 11.25 km^{2} (4.34 sq mi)
- Elevation: 170 m (560 ft)

Population (2025-12-31)
  - Total: 1,385
  - Density: 123.1/km^{2} (318.9/sq mi)
- Time zone: UTC+01:00 (CET)
  - Summer (DST): UTC+02:00 (CEST)
- Postal codes: 54518
- Dialling codes: 06578
- Vehicle registration: WIL
- Website: www.gemeinde-dreis.de

Dreis (German pronunciation: [dʁaɪs]) is an Ortsgemeinde – a municipality belonging to a Verbandsgemeinde, a kind of collective municipality – in the Bernkastel-Wittlich district in Rhineland-Palatinate, Germany.

== Geography ==
Dreis lies on the river Salm at the point where it flows out of the Eifel at the foot of the Burgberg, on the edge of the Wittlich Depression. It belongs to the Verbandsgemeinde of Wittlich-Land, whose seat is in Wittlich, although that town is itself not in the Verbandsgemeinde.

== History ==
Dreis is one of the oldest places in the Wittlicher Land. The village gets its name from the sour spring that can be found in the heart of the village. Dreis, a kingly estate (fisci) was donated by Charlemagne’s brother Carloman I towards the end of the 8th century to the Abbey of Echternach on the river Sauer. In 785, Emperor Charlemagne confirmed his brother’s donation. A certificate of the original donation had not been issued. Carloman died in 771. A copy of the certificate is found in the Abbey’s “golden book” (Liber aureus), which is now kept in Gotha.

Beginning in 1794, Dreis lay under French rule. In 1815 it was assigned to the Kingdom of Prussia at the Congress of Vienna. Since 1946, it has been part of the then newly founded state of Rhineland-Palatinate.

== Politics ==
=== Municipal council ===
The council is made up of 16 council members, who were elected by proportional representation at the municipal election held on 7 June 2009, and the honorary mayor as chairman. The 16 seats are shared among three voters’ groups: Steffgen (6 seats), Lütticken (6 seats) and Berg (4 seats).

=== Coat of arms ===
The municipality’s arms might be described thus: Or an eagle bicapitated displayed sable with nimbi gules surmounted by a Latin cross argent, itself surmounted by a dexter hand palewise proper, the forefinger and middle finger extended, the others flexed.

The arms go back to a court seal from 1722 which bore the inscription SVB MANV SOLIVS DEI (“Under the only God’s hand”). The eagle is the old Imperial eagle. The cross and the hand are traditional charges locally standing for the old jurisdiction that the municipality held. The hand, with the forefinger and middle finger extended, is what in German is called a Schwurhand (“swearing hand” or “oath-taking hand”), as this is the typical gesture locally.

The approval from the state of Rhineland-Palatinate for Dreis to bear its own arms was issued on 20 March 1962.

== Culture and sightseeing ==
=== Schloss Dreis ===
Schloss Dreis is an 18th-century building constructed in 1774 as a summer residence for the abbots of Echternach. It later passed to the Counts of Walderdorff. The two-and-a-half-storey quarry-stone structure incorporates red sandstone architectural elements and decorative features.

The Waldhotel Sonnora in Dreis is, according to Gault Millau, among the nine best restaurants in Germany.
