= Bernkastel-Wittlich =

Coordinates: 49°59′13″N 6°53′23″E

- District
- Flag Coat of arms
- Country: Germany
- State: Rhineland-Palatinate
- Capital: Wittlich

Government
  - District admin.: Gregor Eibes (CDU)

Area
  - Total: 1,168 km^{2} (451 sq mi)

Population (31 December 2025)
  - Total: 112,751
  - Density: 96.53/km^{2} (250.0/sq mi)
- Time zone: UTC+01:00 (CET)
  - Summer (DST): UTC+02:00 (CEST)
- Vehicle registration: WIL, BKS
- Website: bernkastel-wittlich.de

Bernkastel-Wittlich (German: Landkreis Bernkastel-Wittlich) is a district in Rhineland-Palatinate, Germany. It is bounded by (from the north and clockwise) the districts of Vulkaneifel, Cochem-Zell, Rhein-Hunsrück, Birkenfeld, Trier-Saarburg and Bitburg-Prüm.

== History ==
The district was established in 1969 by merging the former districts of Bernkastel and Wittlich.

== Geography ==
The district is situated on both banks of the Moselle, which crosses the territory from southwest to northeast. The land rises to the Eifel in the north and the Hunsrück in the south. A great number of tributaries rise in the Eifel and flow into the Moselle. The Erbeskopf (818 m), the highest peak in the Hunsrück and Rhineland-Palatinate, lies in the very south of the district.

== Coat of arms ==
The coat of arms displays:

- The cross symbolising the bishopric of Trier
- The crayfish from the arms of Bernkastel-Kues
- The keys from the arms of Wittlich
- The red and white pattern of the County of Sponheim, which ruled this part of the Moselle valley in medieval times

== Towns and municipalities ==
Verband-free town
1. Wittlich
Verband-free municipality
1. Morbach

Verbandsgemeinden
1. Bernkastel-Kues; 1. Bernkastel-Kues^{1, 2}; 2. Brauneberg; 3. Burgen; 4. Erden; 5. Gornhausen; 6. Graach an der Mosel; 7. Hochscheid; 8. Kesten; 9. Kleinich; 10. Kommen; 11. Lieser; 12. Lösnich; 13. Longkamp; 14. Maring-Noviand; 15. Minheim; 16. Monzelfeld; 17. Mülheim; 18. Neumagen-Dhron; 19. Piesport; 20. Ürzig; 21. Veldenz; 22. Wintrich; 23. Zeltingen-Rachtig	2. Thalfang am Erbeskopf; 1. Berglicht; 2. Breit; 3. Büdlich; 4. Burtscheid; 5. Deuselbach; 6. Dhronecken; 7. Etgert; 8. Gielert; 9. Gräfendhron; 10. Heidenburg; 11. Hilscheid; 12. Horath; 13. Immert; 14. Lückenburg; 15. Malborn; 16. Merschbach; 17. Neunkirchen; 18. Rorodt; 19. Schönberg; 20. Talling; 21. Thalfang^{1}	3. Traben-Trarbach; 1. Bausendorf; 2. Bengel; 3. Burg; 4. Diefenbach; 5. Enkirch; 6. Flußbach; 7. Hontheim; 8. Irmenach; 9. Kinderbeuern; 10. Kinheim; 11. Kröv; 12. Lötzbeuren; 13. Reil; 14. Starkenburg; 15. Traben-Trarbach^{1, 2}; 16. Willwerscheid	4. Wittlich-Land [seat: Wittlich]; 1. Altrich; 2. Arenrath; 3. Bergweiler; 4. Bettenfeld; 5. Binsfeld; 6. Bruch; 7. Dierfeld; 8. Dierscheid; 9. Dodenburg; 10. Dreis; 11. Eckfeld; 12. Eisenschmitt; 13. Esch; 14. Gipperath; 15. Gladbach; 16. Greimerath; 17. Großlittgen; 18. Hasborn; 19. Heckenmünster; 20. Heidweiler; 21. Hetzerath; 22. Hupperath; 23. Karl; 24. Klausen; 25. Landscheid; 26. Laufeld; 27. Manderscheid; 28. Meerfeld; 29. Minderlittgen; 30. Musweiler; 31. Niederöfflingen; 32. Niederscheidweiler; 33. Niersbach; 34. Oberöfflingen; 35. Oberscheidweiler; 36. Osann-Monzel; 37. Pantenburg; 38. Platten; 39. Plein; 40. Rivenich; 41. Salmtal; 42. Schladt; 43. Schwarzenborn; 44. Sehlem; 45. Wallscheid
^{1}seat of the Verbandsgemeinde; ^{2}town

== Transport links ==
Transport association Verkehrsverbund Region Trier

The Moselstrecke from Koblenz Hbf to Trier Hbf, in service for passenger and freight transport, lines RE1 and RE11 and the Moselweinbahn from Bullay to Traben-Trarbach, line RB85, in service for passenger transport, are partly located in the Bernkastel-Wittlich district. Also the Wengenrohr - Bernkastel-Kues Railway, the Wengenrohr-Daun Railway and the Cross Hunsrück Railway but those are out of service.

Bernkastel-Wittlich district is located in the area of the transport association Verkehrsverbund Region Trier (VRT), the fare of the transport association Verkehrsverbund Rhein-Mosel (VRM) also applies, if the start or destination of the journey is located in the VRM area.

== Twin region ==
At one time, the Borough of Milton Keynes was the twinned region of the district of Bernkastel-Wittlich^{[ 1 ]}.
