= Karl, Germany =

Karl
- Municipality
- Coat of arms

- Location of Karl within Bernkastel-Wittlich district
- Interactive map of Karl
- Location within Germany Location within Rhineland-Palatinate
- Coordinates: 50°02′30″N 6°48′09″E
- Country: Germany
- State: Rhineland-Palatinate
- District: Bernkastel-Wittlich
- Municipal assoc.: Wittlich-Land

Government
  - Mayor (2019–24): Josef Simon

Area
  - Total: 10.46 km^{2} (4.04 sq mi)
- Elevation: 326 m (1,070 ft)

Population (2025-12-31)
  - Total: 196
  - Density: 18.7/km^{2} (48.5/sq mi)
- Time zone: UTC+01:00 (CET)
  - Summer (DST): UTC+02:00 (CEST)
- Postal codes: 54534
- Dialling codes: 06575
- Vehicle registration: WIL

Karl (German pronunciation: [kaʁl]; in Eifel dialect: Koahl) is an Ortsgemeinde – a municipality belonging to a Verbandsgemeinde, a kind of collective municipality – in the Bernkastel-Wittlich district in Rhineland-Palatinate, Germany.

== Geography ==
The municipality lies in the Eifel. The municipal area is 61.8% wooded. Lying some 9 km to the north is Manderscheid. Karl belongs to the Verbandsgemeinde Wittlich-Land.

== History ==
Beginning in 1794, Karl lay under French rule. In 1814 it was assigned to the Kingdom of Prussia at the Congress of Vienna. Since 1947, it has been part of the then newly founded state of Rhineland-Palatinate.

== Politics ==
=== Municipal council ===
The council is made up of 6 council members, who were elected by majority vote at the municipal election held on 7 June 2009, and the honorary mayor as chairman.

=== Coat of arms ===
The municipality's arms might be described thus: Tierced in mantle, dexter argent a cross gules, sinister Or a bend of the second, and in base gules a wheel spoked of six of the first.

== Culture and sightseeing ==
In the middle of the village stands a Bildstock. There is a Rococo column altar from the late 17th century in the municipality chapel.

Beyond the river Lieser, above the Karl Kaufmann Bridge and about halfway up the slope, are found a few remnants of the former Biederburg (castle).

== Economy and infrastructure ==
=== Transport ===
To the south runs the Autobahn A 60, and to the east, the A 1
