= Niederscheidweiler =

- Municipality
- Location of Niederscheidweiler within Bernkastel-Wittlich district
- Interactive map of Niederscheidweiler
- Location within Germany Location within Rhineland-Palatinate
- Coordinates: 50°03′53″N 6°56′54″E
- Country: Germany
- State: Rhineland-Palatinate
- District: Bernkastel-Wittlich
- Municipal assoc.: Wittlich-Land

Government
  - Mayor (2019–24): Stefan Koch

Area
  - Total: 7.83 km^{2} (3.02 sq mi)
- Elevation: 375 m (1,230 ft)

Population (2025-12-31)
  - Total: 278
  - Density: 35.5/km^{2} (92.0/sq mi)
- Time zone: UTC+01:00 (CET)
  - Summer (DST): UTC+02:00 (CEST)
- Postal codes: 54533
- Dialling codes: 06574
- Vehicle registration: WIL
- Website: www.niederscheidweiler.de

Niederscheidweiler is an Ortsgemeinde – a municipality belonging to a Verbandsgemeinde, a kind of collective municipality – in the Bernkastel-Wittlich district in Rhineland-Palatinate, Germany.

== Geography ==
=== Location ===
Niederscheidweiler lies at the edge of the Vulkaneifel on the wooded high ridges above the Alf and Sammetbach valleys. It belongs to the Verbandsgemeinde Wittlich-Land.

== History ==
In 893, Niederscheidweiler had its first documentary mention in the Prümer Urbar, a catalogue of Prüm Abbey’s holdings. In the Middle Ages and early modern times, the municipality belonged to the Electorate of Trier. Beginning in 1794, Niederscheidweiler lay under French rule. In 1814 it was assigned to the Kingdom of Prussia at the Congress of Vienna. Since 1947, it has been part of the then newly founded state of Rhineland-Palatinate.

== Politics ==
=== Municipal council ===
The council is made up of 6 council members, who were elected by proportional representation at the municipal election held on 7 June 2009, and the honorary mayor as chairman.

The municipal election held on 7 June 2009 yielded the following results:

Year	WG für Nsw e.V.	VBB e.V.	Total
2009	5	1	6 seats

In 2004, the election was by majority vote.

=== Coat of arms ===
The municipality's arms might be described thus: Tierced in mantle, dexter argent a cross gules, sinister Or a pastoral staff sable, and in base gules a Latin cross between two stag's attires of the first.

== Culture and sightseeing ==
The Georoute “Devon” leads through the area as a hiking trail. The tower at Saint Hubert's Church comes from the 12th or 13th century.
