= Wallscheid =

- Municipality
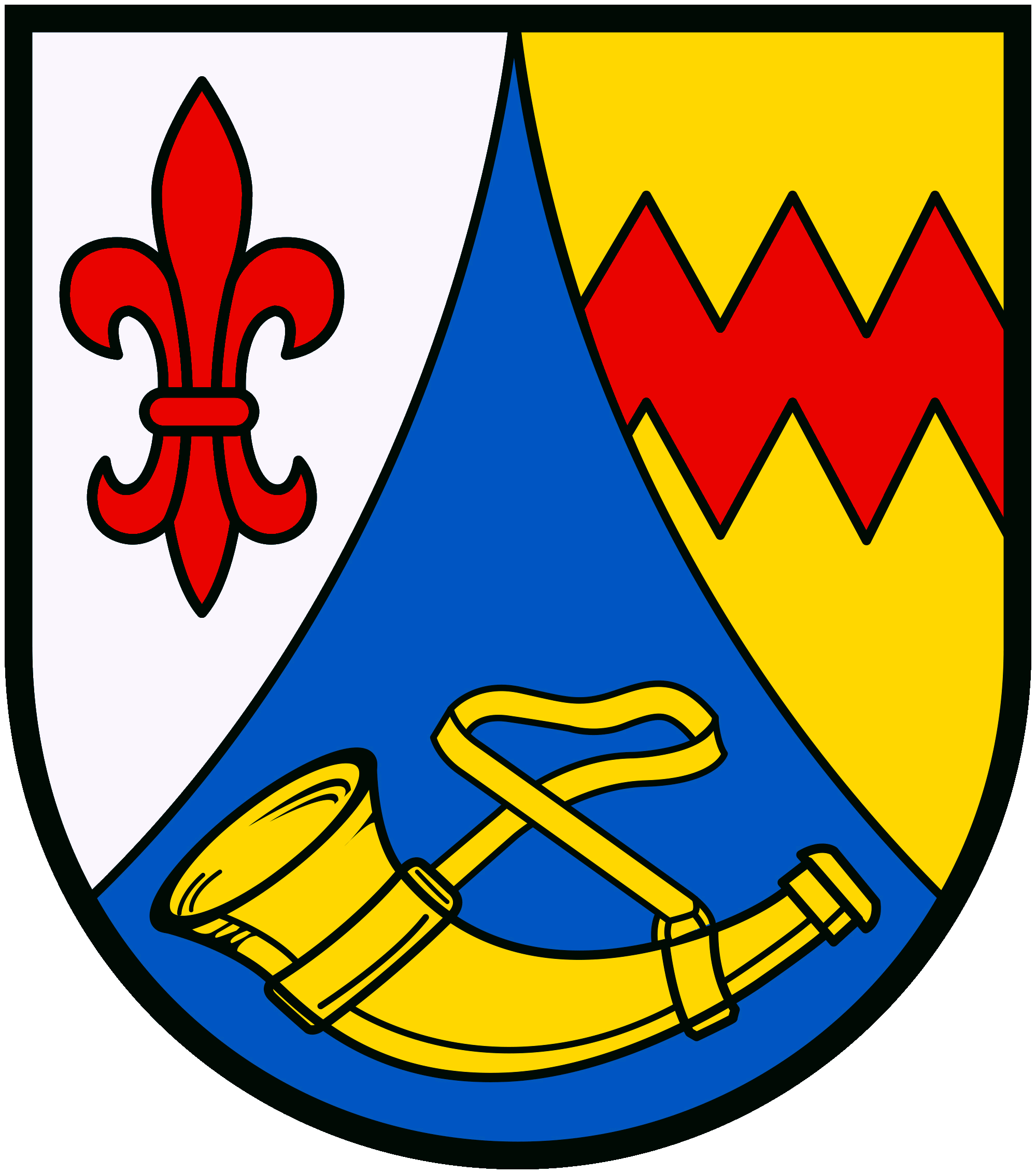
- Coat of arms

- Location of Wallscheid within Bernkastel-Wittlich district
- Interactive map of Wallscheid
- Location within Germany Location within Rhineland-Palatinate
- Coordinates: 50°05′58″N 6°53′05″E
- Country: Germany
- State: Rhineland-Palatinate
- District: Bernkastel-Wittlich
- Municipal assoc.: Wittlich-Land

Government
  - Mayor (2019–24): Uwe Kröffges

Area
  - Total: 5.95 km^{2} (2.30 sq mi)
- Elevation: 430 m (1,410 ft)

Population (2025-12-31)
  - Total: 357
  - Density: 60.0/km^{2} (155/sq mi)
- Time zone: UTC+01:00 (CET)
  - Summer (DST): UTC+02:00 (CEST)
- Postal codes: 54531
- Dialling codes: 06572
- Vehicle registration: WIL

Wallscheid is an Ortsgemeinde – a municipality belonging to a Verbandsgemeinde, a kind of collective municipality – in the Bernkastel-Wittlich district in Rhineland-Palatinate, Germany.

== Geography ==
=== Location ===
The holiday municipality lies in the Eifel; 7 km to the west lies Manderscheid. Wallsch

== History ==
Sometime before 771, Öfflingen, and thereby also today's municipality of Wallscheid, were donated to the Abbey of Echternach. The Lords of Manderscheid were installed as Vögte by the Abbey. Beginning in 1794, Wallscheid lay under French rule. In 1814 it was assigned to the Kingdom of Prussia at the Congress of Vienna. Since 1947, it has been part of the then newly founded state of Rhineland-Palatinate.

== Politics ==
=== Municipal council ===
The council is made up of 8 council members, who were elected by majority vote at the municipal election held on 7 June 2009, and the honorary mayor as chairman.

=== Coat of arms ===
The municipality's arms might be described thus: Tierced in mantle, dexter Or a fleur-de-lis gules, sinister Or a fess dancetty of the second, and in base gules a postal horn of the first.

== Culture and sightseeing ==
=== Buildings ===
Worth mentioning is the Corneliuskapelle a chapel in Wallscheid built in 1777.

== Economy and infrastructure ==
=== Transport ===
To the west runs the Autobahn A 1. In Wittlich is a railway station on the Koblenz-Trier railway line.
