= Binsfeld =

- Municipality
- Coat of arms

- Location of Binsfeld within Bernkastel-Wittlich district
- Interactive map of Binsfeld
- Location within Germany Location within Rhineland-Palatinate
- Coordinates: 49°57′56″N 6°42′29″E
- Country: Germany
- State: Rhineland-Palatinate
- District: Bernkastel-Wittlich
- Municipal assoc.: Wittlich-Land

Government
  - Mayor (2019–24): Andreas Falk

Area
  - Total: 9.95 km^{2} (3.84 sq mi)
- Elevation: 320 m (1,050 ft)

Population (2025-12-31)
  - Total: 1,257
  - Density: 126/km^{2} (327/sq mi)
- Time zone: UTC+01:00 (CET)
  - Summer (DST): UTC+02:00 (CEST)
- Postal codes: 54518
- Dialling codes: 06575
- Vehicle registration: WIL
- Website: ortsgemeinde-binsfeld.de

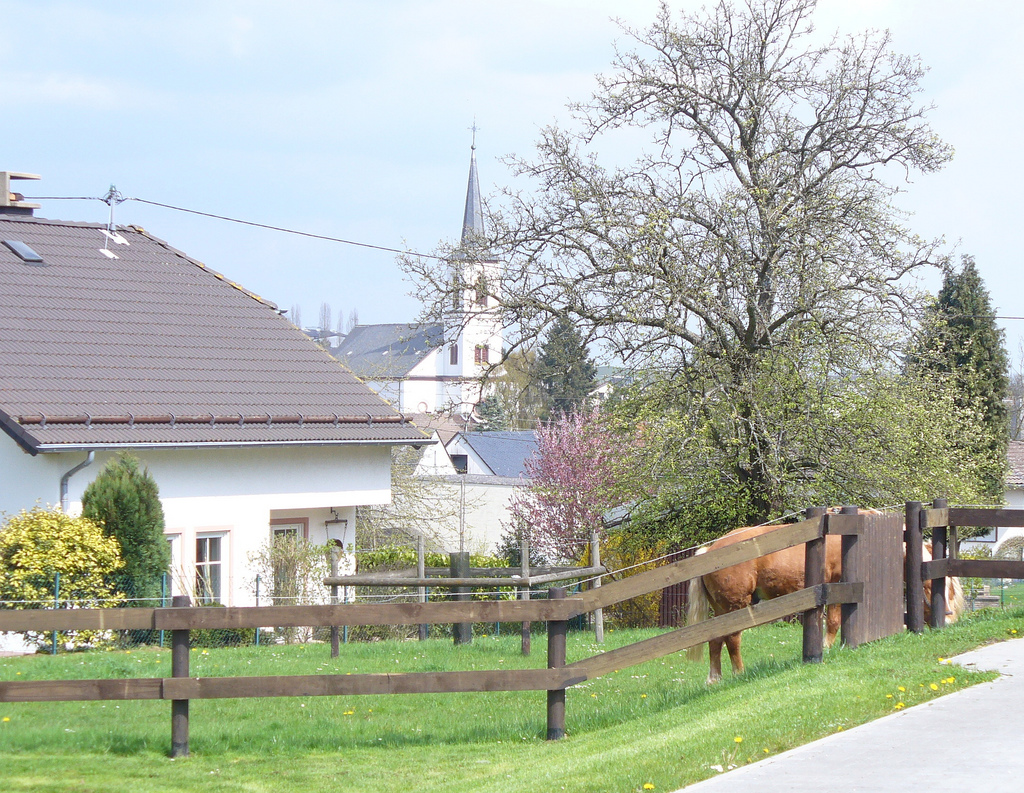
Binsfeld

Binsfeld (German pronunciation: [ˈbɪnsfɛlt]) near Wittlich in the Eifel is an Ortsgemeinde – a municipality belonging to a Verbandsgemeinde, a kind of collective municipality – in the Bernkastel-Wittlich district in Rhineland-Palatinate, Germany. Nearby is the American Spangdahlem Air Base.

== Geography ==
The municipality lies in the South Eifel. The nearest middle centres are Wittlich and Bitburg. It belongs to the Verbandsgemeinde of Wittlich-Land, whose seat is in Wittlich, although that town is itself not in the Verbandsgemeinde.

== History ==
In 844, Binsfeld had its first documentary mention. Binsfeld was in the 17th century held by the Electorate of Trier. No later than 1551 (Binsfeld postal cross), Binsfeld had a postal station on the Dutch Postal Route (Niederländischer Postkurs) from Brussels by way of Augsburg to Innsbruck, Trento and Italy. From 1794, Binsfeld lay under French rule, and in 1815 was assigned to the Kingdom of Prussia at the Congress of Vienna. Since 1946, it has been part of the then newly founded state of Rhineland-Palatinate.

From 1900 to 1965, Binsfeld was linked to the Cologne-Trier section of the Eifelbahn (railway) by the Philippsheim–Binsfeld narrow-gauge railway.

== Politics ==
=== Municipal council ===
The council is made up of 16 council members, who were elected by majority vote at the municipal election held on 7 June 2009, and the honorary mayor as chairman.

=== Coat of arms ===
The German blazon reads: In Silber und Rot geteiltem Schild oben ein rotes Balkenkreuz, unten ein sechsspeichiges goldenes Rad.

The municipality's arms might in English heraldic language be described thus: Per fess argent a cross gules, and gules a wheel spoked of six Or.

The arms were taken from those borne by the now no longer existing Verbandsgemeinde of Binsfeld. The village was formerly ruled by the Electorate of Trier, whence comes the charge above the line of partition, Electoral Trier's red cross on a silver field. The golden wheel stands for both agriculture and the huckster's trade that was formerly widespread in Binsfeld. This was once paramount to the local commercial structure, as farming still is today.

Binsfeld was granted the right to bear its own arms in 1980.

=== Town partnerships ===
Binsfeld fosters partnerships with the following places:

- (Germany) Binsfeld, a constituent community of Arnstein, Main-Spessart, Bavaria since 1987

== Culture and sightseeing ==
- Kaisermühle (mill)
- Steam locomotive memorial

== Economy and infrastructure ==
Binsfeld lies right on Bundesstraße 50 and Landesstraße (State Road) 46.

== Famous people ==
Peter Binsfeld (b. about 1545; d. 24 November 1598) was an auxiliary bishop in Trier and witch theoretician. Moreover, he excelled in designing a pastoral theology.
