= Eckfeld =

- Municipality
- Coat of arms

- Location of Eckfeld within Bernkastel-Wittlich district
- Interactive map of Eckfeld
- Location within Germany Location within Rhineland-Palatinate
- Coordinates: 50°06′35.1972″N 6°50′40.3692″E
- Country: Germany
- State: Rhineland-Palatinate
- District: Bernkastel-Wittlich
- Municipal assoc.: Wittlich-Land

Government
  - Mayor (2019–24): Leo Schmitz

Area
  - Total: 12.74 km^{2} (4.92 sq mi)
- Elevation: 450 m (1,480 ft)

Population (2025-12-31)
  - Total: 367
  - Density: 28.8/km^{2} (74.6/sq mi)
- Time zone: UTC+01:00 (CET)
  - Summer (DST): UTC+02:00 (CEST)
- Postal codes: 54531
- Dialling codes: 06572
- Vehicle registration: WIL

Eckfeld is an Ortsgemeinde – a municipality belonging to a Verbandsgemeinde, a kind of collective municipality – in the Bernkastel-Wittlich district in Rhineland-Palatinate, Germany.

== Geography ==
Eckfeld lies in the middle of the Vulkaneifel with its low-mountain landscape right near the Eifelmaare (sunken volcanoes). Nearby is the Eckfelder Trockenmaar (a dry maar) with its many palaeontological finds. Especially well known are small ancient horses and the world's oldest honeybee.

Eckfeld belongs to the Verbandsgemeinde Wittlich-Land.

== History ==
The municipality had its first documentary mention in 973 in a donation document from Emperor Otto I at the Abbey of Echternach. Beginning in 1794, Eckfeld lay under French rule. In 1814 it was assigned to the Kingdom of Prussia at the Congress of Vienna. Since 1947, it has been part of the then newly founded state of Rhineland-Palatinate.

== Politics ==
=== Municipal council ===
The council is made up of 8 council members, who were elected by majority vote at the municipal election held on 7 June 2009, and the honorary mayor as chairman.

== Culture and sightseeing ==
Fossil finds at the 44.3-million-year-old Eckfelder Maar (for example the “Eckfeld Ancient Horse” and the “World’s Oldest Honeybee”) have been made available to the Maar Museum in Manderscheid by the Rhineland-Palatinate State Assembly for Natural History (Landessammlung für Naturkunde Rheinland-Pfalz).

=== Church and monastery ===
The tower at Saint Catherine's Church (Kirche St. Katharina) in Eckfeld was built in 1450 and expanded into a defensive tower. Built onto the tower in 1882 was a new nave.

To Eckfeld belongs the former Buchholz Monastery with the Church of the Visitation of Mary (Kirche Mariä Heimsuchung). Saint Catherine's Church in Eckfeld is, like the church in Pantenburg, a branch church of the Buchholz church.
