= Schwarzenborn =

- Municipality
- Coat of arms
- Interactive map of Schwarzenborn
- Location within Germany Location within Rhineland-Palatinate
- Coordinates: 50°02′20″N 06°42′41″E
- Country: Germany
- State: Rhineland-Palatinate
- District: Bernkastel-Wittlich
- Municipal assoc.: Wittlich-Land

Government
  - Mayor (2019–24): Sven Engler

Area
  - Total: 5.13 km^{2} (1.98 sq mi)
- Elevation: 420 m (1,380 ft)

Population (2025-12-31)
  - Total: 57
  - Density: 11/km^{2} (29/sq mi)
- Time zone: UTC+01:00 (CET)
  - Summer (DST): UTC+02:00 (CEST)
- Postal codes: 54533
- Dialling codes: 06567
- Vehicle registration: WIL

Schwarzenborn (German pronunciation: [ˈʃvaʁtsn̩ˌbɔʁn]) is an Ortsgemeinde – a municipality belonging to a Verbandsgemeinde, a kind of collective municipality – in the Bernkastel-Wittlich district in Rhineland-Palatinate, Germany.

== Geography ==
=== Location ===
The municipality lies in mixed woodland in the western Vulkaneifel not far from Spangdahlem Air Base. The municipal area is 71.2% wooded. Schwarzenborn belongs to the Verbandsgemeinde Wittlich-Land.

== History ==
Schwarzenborn belonged from the Late Middle Ages to the County of Manderscheid and until the line died out in 1762, the village was ruled by the Manderscheid-Kail branch of the noble family, who owned a castle in nearby Oberkail. Thereafter, the lordship passed to the Manderscheid-Blankenheim line, which held it until the lands on the Rhine’s left bank became French. In 1814, Schwarzenborn passed to Prussia, which administered the village through the Mayoralty (Bürgermeisterei) of Oberkail. The Oberkail church also served the Schwarzenborners as their parish church, but Himmerod Abbey, too, about 3 km to the southeast, characterized the area. Since 1947, Schwarzenborn has been part of the then newly founded state of Rhineland-Palatinate.

== Politics ==
=== Municipal council ===
The council is made up of 6 council members, who were elected by majority vote at the municipal election held on 7 June 2009, and the honorary mayor as chairman.

== Culture and sightseeing ==
Schwarzenborn has at its disposal an inn and a little chapel with a slender tower.
