= Plein =

- Municipality
- Coat of arms

- Location of Plein within Bernkastel-Wittlich district
- Interactive map of Plein
- Location within Germany Location within Rhineland-Palatinate
- Coordinates: 50°01′49″N 6°52′36″E
- Country: Germany
- State: Rhineland-Palatinate
- District: Bernkastel-Wittlich
- Municipal assoc.: Wittlich-Land

Government
  - Mayor (2019–24): Bernd Michael Rehm

Area
  - Total: 7.22 km^{2} (2.79 sq mi)
- Elevation: 360 m (1,180 ft)

Population (2025-12-31)
  - Total: 625
  - Density: 86.6/km^{2} (224/sq mi)
- Time zone: UTC+01:00 (CET)
  - Summer (DST): UTC+02:00 (CEST)
- Postal codes: 54518
- Dialling codes: 06571
- Vehicle registration: WIL
- Website: www.og-plein.de

Plein (German pronunciation: [plaɪn]) is an Ortsgemeinde – a municipality belonging to a Verbandsgemeinde, a kind of collective municipality – in the Bernkastel-Wittlich district in Rhineland-Palatinate, Germany. It belongs to the Verbandsgemeinde of Wittlich-Land, whose seat is in Wittlich, although that town is itself not in the Verbandsgemeinde.

== History ==
In 1317, Plein had its first documentary mention as plin. Beginning in 1794, Plein lay under French rule. In 1814 it was assigned to the Kingdom of Prussia at the Congress of Vienna. Since 1947, it has been part of the then newly founded state of Rhineland-Palatinate.

== Politics ==
=== Municipal council ===
The council is made up of 12 council members, who were elected by majority vote at the municipal election held on 7 June 2009, and the honorary mayor as chairman.

=== Coat of arms ===
The German blazon reads: Unter silbernem Schildhaupt mit drei schwarzen Muscheln (2/1) steht in rotem Feld das silberne Pleiner Viadukt mit 4 Pfeilern über einer von links nach rechts sich windenden goldenen Schlange.

The municipality's arms might in English heraldic language be described thus: Gules an arched viaduct with four piers, the inner two longer than the outer, argent, in base a serpent Or, in a chief of the second three escallops sable, two and one.

The shells are Saint James's scallops. Pilgrims on Saint James's Way carried them as a way of recognizing each other. One of the many “ways” that made up Saint James's Way led by Plein.

== Culture and sightseeing ==
Plein lies on the Maare-Mosel-Radweg (cycling path) on the former Wittlich-Daun railway right-of-way; here it leads across two viaducts and through two tunnels. Since the TV-Wandertag there have been four marked hiking trails of the Trierischer Volksfreund (daily newspaper, abbreviated “TV”).
