= Niederöfflingen =

- Municipality
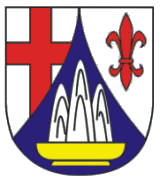
- Coat of arms

- Location of Niederöfflingen within Bernkastel-Wittlich district
- Interactive map of Niederöfflingen
- Location within Germany Location within Rhineland-Palatinate
- Coordinates: 50°03′35″N 6°53′23″E
- Country: Germany
- State: Rhineland-Palatinate
- District: Bernkastel-Wittlich
- Municipal assoc.: Wittlich-Land

Government
  - Mayor (2019–24): Hermann Josef Clemens

Area
  - Total: 8.17 km^{2} (3.15 sq mi)
- Elevation: 379 m (1,243 ft)

Population (2025-12-31)
  - Total: 436
  - Density: 53.4/km^{2} (138/sq mi)
- Time zone: UTC+01:00 (CET)
  - Summer (DST): UTC+02:00 (CEST)
- Postal codes: 54533
- Dialling codes: 06574
- Vehicle registration: WIL
- Website: www.niederoefflingen.de

Niederöfflingen is an Ortsgemeinde – a municipality belonging to a Verbandsgemeinde, a kind of collective municipality – in the Bernkastel-Wittlich district in Rhineland-Palatinate, Germany.

== Geography ==
=== Location ===
The municipality lies in the Vulkaneifel at an elevation of 375 m above sea level. The nearest middle centre is the district seat, Wittlich. Niederöfflingen belongs to the Verbandsgemeinde Wittlich-Land.

=== Climate ===
Niederöfflingen lies in a transitional zone between temperate oceanic climate and continental climate with its attendant mild winters and warm summers.

== History ==
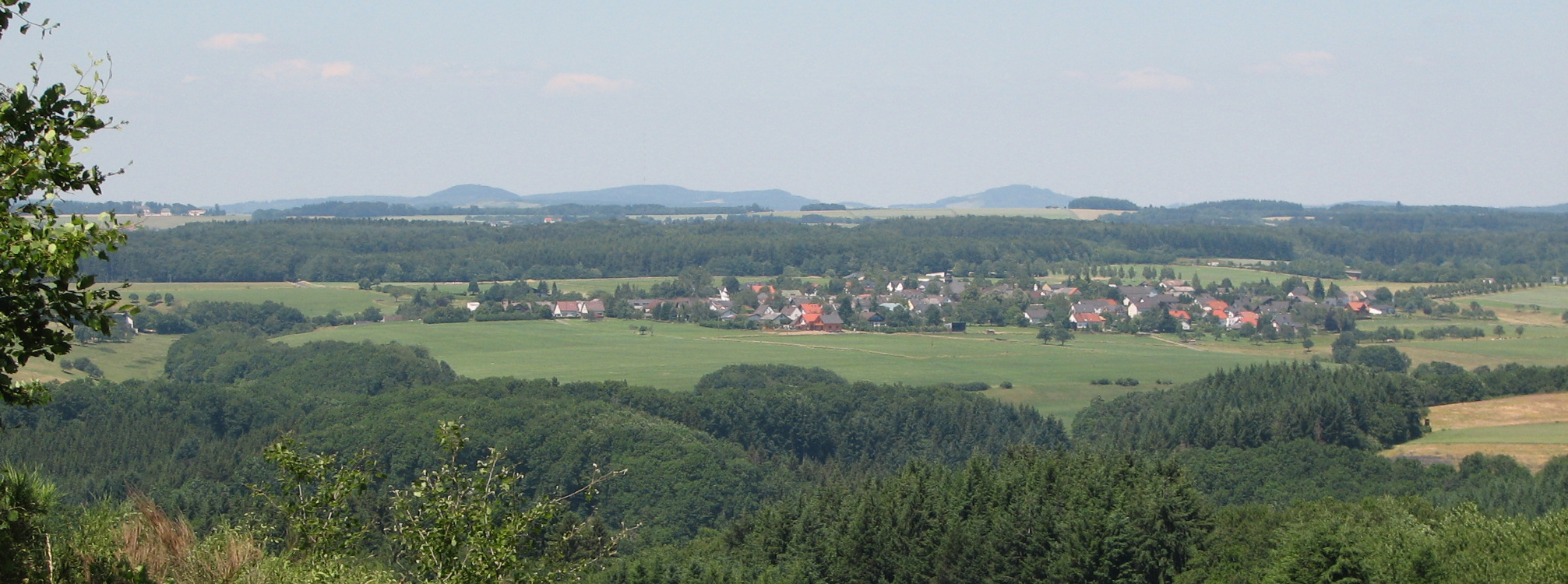
View from the Greimerath Heights over Niederöfflingen

Niederöfflingen's history reaches all the way back to 785 when Charlemagne donated the villa … Officinus (Niederöfflingen) to the Abbey of Echternach. As early as 1179, the Abbey of Echternach forsook its holding of Niederöfflingen in Archbishop of Trier Arnold's favour, thus making it an Electoral-Trier holding. Niederöfflingen was assigned to the Amt of Manderscheid and was part of the high court of Obermanderscheid.

In the Nine Years' War (1688-1697; known in Germany as the Pfälzischer Erbfolgekrieg, or War of the Palatine Succession), the Sun King's soldiers laid great swathes of the Eifel country in rubble and ashes. Under the Treaty of Ryswick, the Eifel country was for almost a hundred years freed of French hegemony.

According to the 1702 taxation rolls, 20 families were living in 18 houses in the early 18th century. This was six fewer houses than there had been in 1563, now that the wars in the 17th century had wrought their havoc.

In the French Revolutionary Wars (1792-1794), the French conquered the Eifel. Established as administrative units on the French model were departments, which in turn were subdivided into arrondissements and cantons. On 30 July 1802, the Mayoralty (Bürgermeisterei in German; Mairie in French) of Niederöfflingen came into being, encompassing the centres of Niederöfflingen, Gipperath, Greimerath, Hasborn, Oberscheidweiler and Niederscheidweiler.

In 1814, French times came to an end in the Eifel, which as a result of the Congress of Vienna was assigned to Prussia.

The municipal structure introduced by the French, however, still lasted 30 years beyond this time, before it was swept away in 1845 by the Prussian structure. Even the civil registry (baptisms, marriages and deaths) introduced by Napoleon was carried on by the new administration.

The Mayoralty – later Amt – of Niederöfflingen existed until 1934. In this year, the Ämter of Laufeld and Niederöfflingen were abolished and united with the Amt of Manderscheid.

American troops arrived in March 1945, whereupon the time of the Third Reich in Niederöfflingen came to an end.

The last great administrative reform, which was introduced in 1968, led to the municipality being grouped into the Verbandsgemeinde of Manderscheid, since 2014 the Verbandsgemeinde Wittlich-Land.

Since the 1970s, a modern multipurpose community hall has been built as a wing on the old school, three new development areas have been laid out, a village square with a fountain has been built and Donatusstraße has been remodelled and expanded as a village thoroughfare.

== Politics ==
=== Municipal council ===
The council is made up of 8 council members, who were elected by proportional representation at the municipal election held on 7 June 2009, and the honorary mayor as chairman.

The municipal election held on 7 June 2009 yielded the following results:

Year	WG Braschel	WG Theisen	Total
2009	2	6	8 seats

In 2004, the election was by majority vote.

=== Coat of arms ===
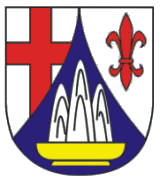

The municipality's arms might be described thus: Tierced in mantle, dexter argent a cross gules, sinister argent a fleur-de-lis of the second, and in base azure a fountain with basin Or and water jets of the first.

The charge in base is the Edeltrudis Fountain on the village's eastern outskirts. The cross on the dexter (armsbearer's right, viewer's left) side refers to Niederöfflingen's centuries-long allegiance to the Electorate of Trier. The lily on the sinister (armsbearer's left, viewer's right) side stands for Niederöfflingen's history as an Abbey of Echternach holding.

== Culture and sightseeing ==
=== Village culture ===
At the district-level judging in the contest Unser Dorf soll schöner werden - unser Dorf hat Zukunft ("Our Village Should Be Lovelier – Our Village Has A Future"), Niederöfflingen scored first place in the main class in 1997.

=== Buildings ===
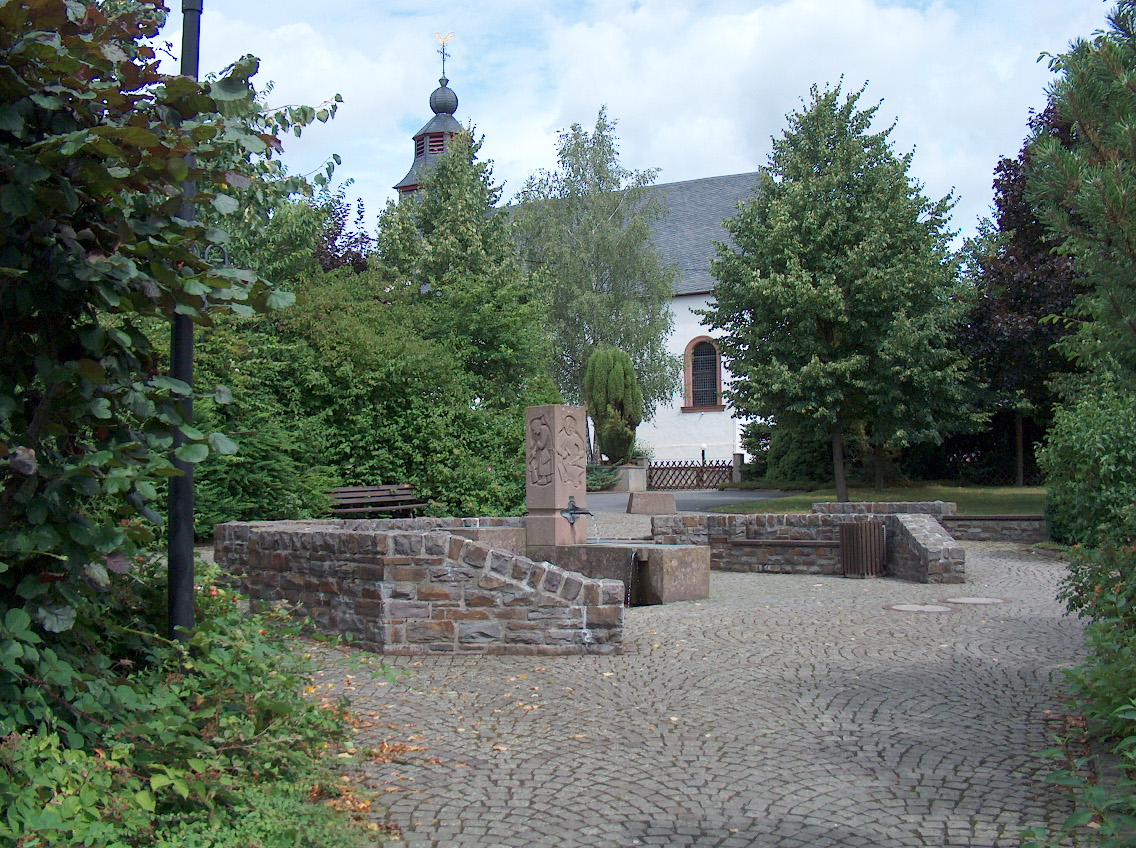
Niederöfflingen village square

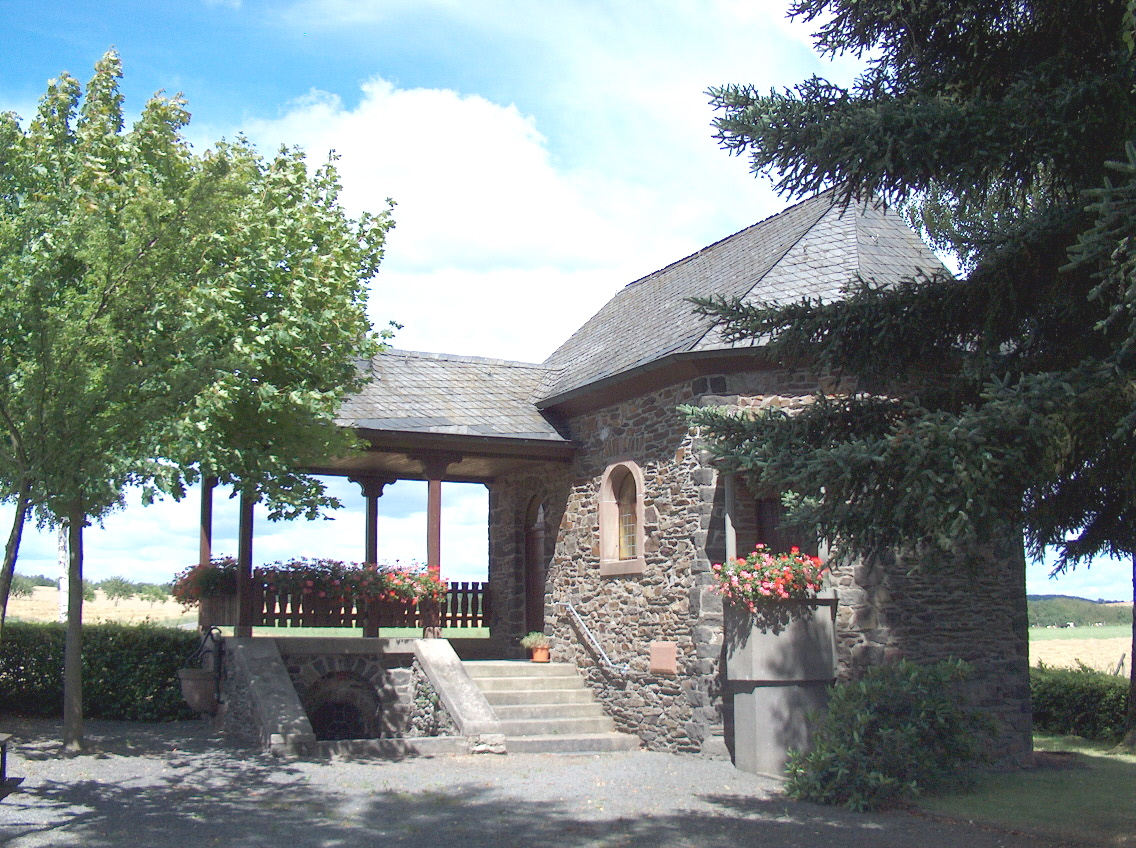
Edeltrudiskapelle

A church consecrated to "St. Adrud" had its first documentary mention in 1197. A new building of Saint Edeltrudis's Church was built in 1822, for which stonecarving from the destroyed Himmerod Abbey was used for doors and windows, and also a portal. When building work finished on the new church, the parish obtained a new high altar in 1826.

In 1956, the Baroque altar was restored and "it was given as a new adornment a figure of Saint Edeltrudis, a carved work from the year 1500, that has stood in the Edeltrudis Chapel ever since …". In the autumn of 1970, extensive renovations were begun: a new heating system was built in and a new floor laid.

On Niederöfflingen's eastern outskirts stands the Edeltrudiskapelle ("Saint Edeltrudis’s Chapel"). A stone figure of Saint Willibrord is reckoned to be from Romanesque (950-1250) times. Besides a few Gothic figures, there is a walled cross bearing the year 1608. The aforementioned wooden figure of Saint Edeltrudis stems from the end of the 15th century. The chapel was built about 1850 next to a spring. The springwater, which is said to have healing powers, can be taken through a hand-driven pump beside the sandstone basin.

On 4 February 1945, the chapel, in which the Wehrmacht stored their munitions, was utterly destroyed in an explosion. Today's Edeltrudiskapelle, newly built on the same spot, was consecrated on 25 July 1950.

=== Religion ===
As an autonomous parish, Niederöfflingen was listed as early as 1330 in the ecclesiastical taxation rolls. Then, it had to pay 24 solidi. On the occasion of the visitation on 22 February 1657 undertaken under Carl Casper von Leyen, the ravages of the Thirty Years' War were shown.

== Economy and infrastructure ==
=== Transport ===
Through the northeastern part of the municipal area runs the Autobahn A 1, and right through the village itself runs Landesstraße (State Road) 64. Likewise in the northeast runs the Maare-Mosel-Radweg (cycle path) between Daun and Bernkastel-Kues.

=== Infrastructure ===
A new commercial area called Auf dem Soll is in planning, as are a new residential area and a solar park in the area known as Auf Heckert. Niederöfflingen has its own community hall, the Wilhelm-Hees-Halle. Along with eight other municipalities, it forms the "Öfflingen" Forest District (Forstrevier), founding its own forest administration to furnish jobs for forestry workers, to create synergical effects in cultivating the woodlands and employing the forestry workers and to have a highly mechanized wood harvest with optimal added value.

Since February 1999, a forest kindergarten has been part of the local kindergarten, which is also attended by children from neighbouring places. The forest kindergarten's quality feature, besides forest paedagogy, is the naturalistic, as well as holistic and nature-oriented, work with the children.

== Tourism ==
Through the municipal area run the mountainbike trails "Alfbach" (Tour 8988) and "Wittlich Landesblick" (Tour 6696), as well as VulkanBike Trailpark's Tour 3 Manderscheid (Burgen-Schluchten-Maare – "Castles-Gorges-Maars"). Along the river Lambach, one can reach on foot the river Lieser, which one can then follow along the Lieserpfad, a hiking trail, maintained by the Eifel Club, to Daun or Wittlich. The Eifel Club's main hiking trail 16 (east-west trails), the Mosel-Our-Weg between Alf and Ourstausee/Bivelser Steg, leads through the middle of the village. On the Devon-Route, one of three GEO routes in the Manderscheid region, the links among natural, cultural and earth history reveal themselves.

== Famous people ==
=== Honorary citizens ===
Jakob Konrad SVD (b. 3 August 1914; d. 4 December 2006), priest with the Divine Word Missionaries, Honorary Citizen of Niederöfflingen since 1994, and of Lourdes since 1994
