= Hasborn =

- Municipality
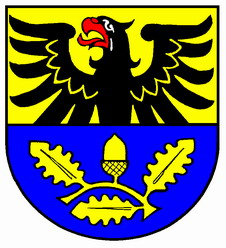
- Coat of arms

- Location of Hasborn within Bernkastel-Wittlich district
- Interactive map of Hasborn
- Location within Germany Location within Rhineland-Palatinate
- Coordinates: 50°03′09″N 6°54′36″E
- Country: Germany
- State: Rhineland-Palatinate
- District: Bernkastel-Wittlich
- Municipal assoc.: Wittlich-Land

Government
  - Mayor (2019–24): Hermann Josef Leister

Area
  - Total: 6.18 km^{2} (2.39 sq mi)
- Elevation: 375 m (1,230 ft)

Population (2025-12-31)
  - Total: 616
  - Density: 99.7/km^{2} (258/sq mi)
- Time zone: UTC+01:00 (CET)
  - Summer (DST): UTC+02:00 (CEST)
- Postal codes: 54533
- Dialling codes: 06574
- Vehicle registration: WIL

Hasborn is an Ortsgemeinde – a municipality belonging to a Verbandsgemeinde, a kind of collective municipality – in the Bernkastel-Wittlich district in Rhineland-Palatinate, Germany.

== Geography ==
The municipality lies in the Eifel – indeed in the heights of the Vulkaneifel – and belongs to the Verbandsgemeinde Wittlich-Land.

== History ==
In 1341, Hasborn had its first documentary mention in a document from Prince-Archbishop-Elector Balduin. The name is interpreted thus: Born means “spring” (cognate with the English “bourne”), while the first syllable is from a Frankish name, Hasso, all of which means that the municipality's name means “Hasso’s Spring”. The village grew out of a farm that that Frank set up near where the former smithy, which was originally (until 1775) a church, later was. Running by this spring was once an old Roman road whose remnants can still be seen in a deep holloway known as der Holg (the standard German word for holloway is Hohlweg). Given this, Hasso's farm might also have been an inn at which travellers rested or changed horses. Indeed, in later times, at what is today the Hotel Thomas, postal coach horses on the Koblenz-Trier stretch of the road were changed.

Another origin of Hasborn is believed to have lain in the now long vanished village of Ritzeroth, which supposedly lay in a side valley of the Sammetbach along what is now the road to Oberscheidweiler. The village's existence has only been handed down orally. It might have died out in the Plague during the Middle Ages. Today only the cadastral name “Reizat” recalls this vanished village.

Beginning in 1794, Hasborn lay under French rule. In 1814 it was assigned to the Kingdom of Prussia at the Congress of Vienna. Since 1947, it has been part of the then newly founded state of Rhineland-Palatinate.

== Politics ==
=== Municipal council ===
The council is made up of 12 council members, who were elected by majority vote at the municipal election held on 7 June 2009, and the honorary mayor as chairman.

=== Coat of arms ===
The municipality's arms might be described thus: Per fess, Or a demi-eagle displayed sable armed and langued gules, and azure an oak sprig embowed couped in sinister, fructed of one and leafed of three, all of the first.

== Culture and sightseeing ==
=== Natural monuments ===
==== Hasborn Sour Spring ====
In the Sammetbach valley between Hasborn and Oberscheidweiler, right on the bank of the Sammetbach, lies the Hasborner Sauerbrunnen (“Hasborn Sour Spring”), a spring emerging from, and also encased in, Devonian stone. The springwater is brown in colour and tastes sourish. Responsible for the colour is dissolved iron, and for the taste, carbon dioxide (CO_{2}) of volcanic origin.

==== Oak grove ====
The oak grove is a stand of oaktrees in the middle of Hasborn almost 400 years old that is unique in Germany. The local lore has it that it came to be during the Thirty Years' War when marauding bands made it impossible for the farmers to drive their swine to pasture in the surrounding oak forests. Instead, the villagers gathered acorns together in the woods and then cast them at the edge of the village to the animals as fodder. Some acorns were worked into the ground by the creatures, leading to growth.

==== Schanzley ====
The Schanzley is a steep crag high over the Sammetbach valley lying deep in the forest and therefore hard to find.

==== Neuglück coppermine ====
At the municipal limit with Willwerscheid is found an old, disused coppermine called Neuglück. The entrance is barred by a gate in the mountain, but one can see into the gallery.

=== Buildings ===
==== Alte Kapelle Sankt Rochus ====
Saint Roch's Old Chapel (Alte Kapelle Sankt Rochus) has a high altar from about 1700 (Dehio). It is a former parish church from 1775 with Stations of the Cross. In 1967 it was deconsecrated and in 1997 and 1998 it underwent renovation both inside and outside by the Deutsche Stiftung Denkmalschutz (“German Monument Protection Foundation”). Today it is a cultural centre used for events such as exhibitions, concerts, readings and theatre.

==== Neue Kirche Sankt Rochus ====
Saint Roch's New Church (Neue Kirche Sankt Rochus) is a new, modern church with a tent roof in the old oak grove. It was consecrated in 1968. The architect was Böhr from Trier. It has a great organ built by Alfred Führer that was once found in Bergkamen.

==== Hasborn Mill ====
The Hasborn Mill (Hasborner Mühle), standing on the Sammetbach and used until 1957 as a flour mill, has stood empty for the last few years.

=== Woodyard ===
In Hasborn is found the Rhineland-Palatinate State Forests’ high-grade woodyard. In a broad area, all high-grade wood from far around is kept for inspection and auction. The way to the yard branches off the road to Niederöfflingen or the Maare-Moselle Cycle Path (Maare-Mosel-Radweg) and is signposted.

=== Photovoltaic complex ===
In Hasborn is found one of Rhineland-Palatinate's biggest photovoltaic complexes. In 2008, in an area of 23 ha, state-of-the-art elements were installed, right next to the high-grade woodyard.

=== Sport ===
At the DJK Hasborn e.V., a sport club with more than 500 members, football, tennis, gymnastics and volleyball are practised. In Hasborn are found a grass football pitch, a training square, a big, multipurpose sport hall and a nine-pin bowling alley at the Hotel Thomas. Moreover, the Maare-Moselle Cycle Path (Maare-Mosel-Radweg) runs along the old disused Eifelbahn (railway) alignment through the municipality.

== Economy and infrastructure ==
=== Transport ===
By way of the Hasborn interchange, there is a direct link to the Autobahn A 1. Through Hasborn runs Landesstraße (State Road) 52, the old linking road between Trier and Koblenz. Buses run to Wittlich and Daun.

=== Education ===
- Kindergarten Hasborn-Greimerath
- six-class primary school attended by children from all surrounding villages.

== Notable people ==
Sons and daughters of the town:

- Hermann Simon (1947– ), entrepreneur, management thinker, professor of economics
- Rebecca Stephany (1980), artist and professor for communication design
