= Salm (Moselle) =

River in Germany

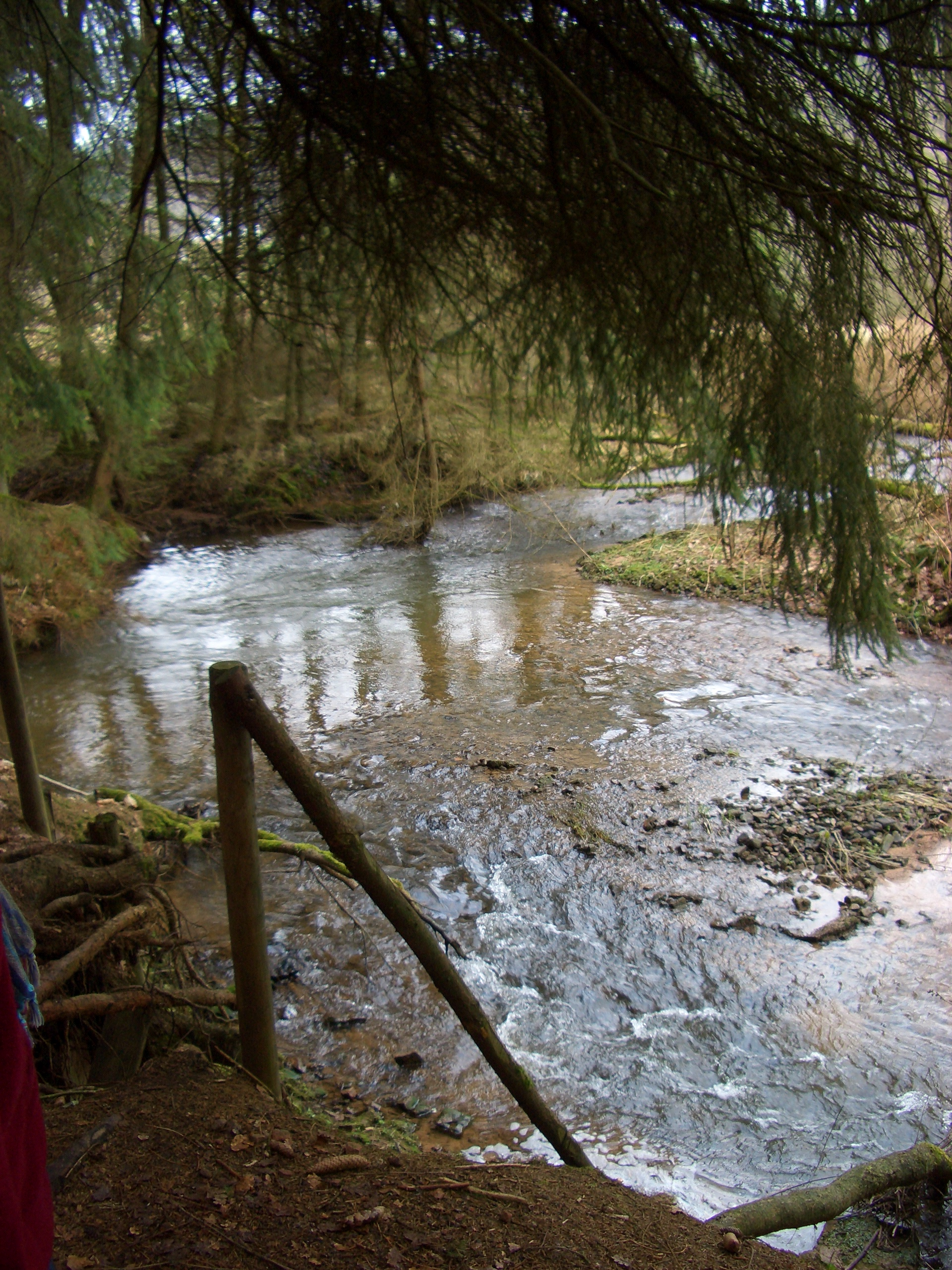
- The Salm between Eichelhütte and Himmerod in the Eifel

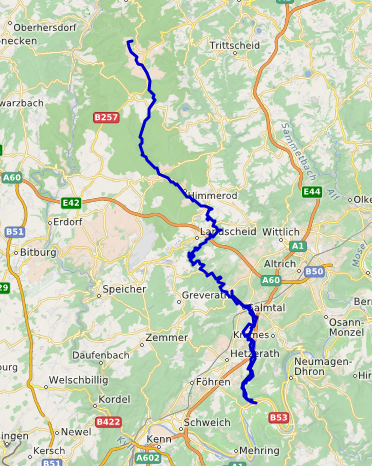

Location
- Country: Germany

Physical characteristics
- Source
  - location: Eifel
- Mouth
  - location: Moselle
  - coordinates: 49°50′25″N 6°51′8″E
- Length: 63 km (39 mi)

Basin features
- Progression: Moselle→ Rhine→ North Sea

The Salm (German pronunciation: [zalm]) is a 63-kilometre-long (39 mi) river in western Germany (Rhineland-Palatinate), a left-bank tributary to the river Moselle. It rises in the Eifel, near the village of Salm, south of Gerolstein. The Salm flows generally south, through Großlittgen, Dreis, and Salmtal. It passes west of Wittlich. It empties into the Moselle in Klüsserath.

== See also ==
- List of rivers of Rhineland-Palatinate
