= Laufeld =

- Municipality
- Coat of arms

- Location of Laufeld within Bernkastel-Wittlich district
- Interactive map of Laufeld
- Location within Germany Location within Rhineland-Palatinate
- Coordinates: 50°04′43″N 6°51′50″E
- Country: Germany
- State: Rhineland-Palatinate
- District: Bernkastel-Wittlich
- Municipal assoc.: Wittlich-Land

Government
  - Mayor (2019–24): Karl-Josef Junk

Area
  - Total: 6.11 km^{2} (2.36 sq mi)
- Elevation: 400 m (1,300 ft)

Population (2025-12-31)
  - Total: 521
  - Density: 85.3/km^{2} (221/sq mi)
- Time zone: UTC+01:00 (CET)
  - Summer (DST): UTC+02:00 (CEST)
- Postal codes: 54533
- Dialling codes: 06572
- Vehicle registration: WIL
- Website: www.laufeld.de

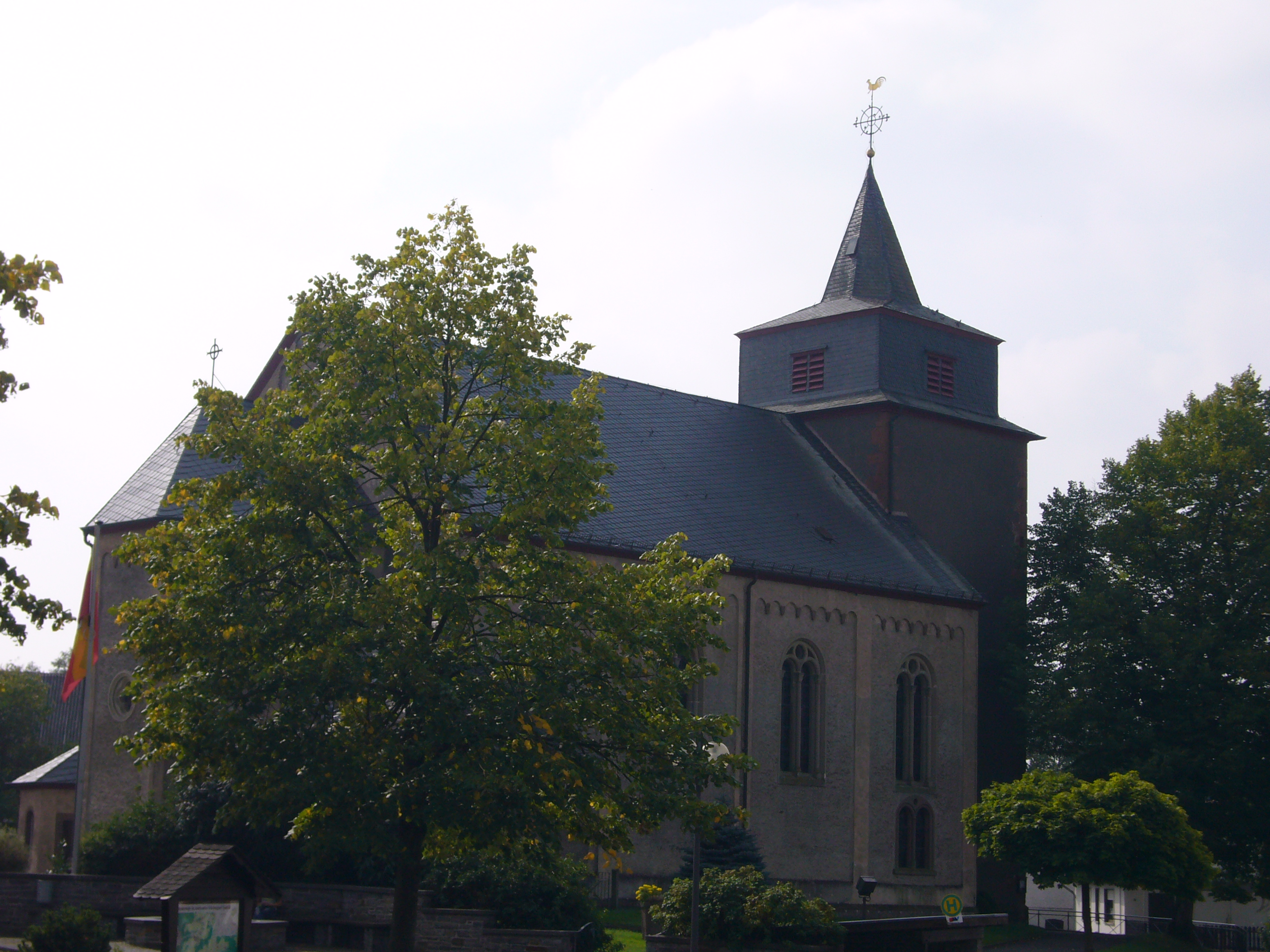
Saint Willibrord’s Church in Laufeld

Laufeld (German pronunciation: [ˈlaʊfɛlt]) is an Ortsgemeinde – a municipality belonging to a Verbandsgemeinde, a kind of collective municipality – in the Bernkastel-Wittlich district in Rhineland-Palatinate, Germany.

== Geography ==
The municipality lies in the Eifel and belongs to the Verbandsgemeinde Wittlich-Land.

== History ==
The “Laufeld Culture” (Hallstatt times, about 700 BC) took its name from a great burying ground that had been found near Laufeld.

In 1344, King John of Luxembourg acquired from the Abbey of Echternach the Hof Laufeld (“Laufeld Estate”). Shortly thereafter, this ended up in the ownership of the Counts of Manderscheid. Beginning in 1794, Laufeld lay under French rule. In 1814 it was assigned to the Kingdom of Prussia at the Congress of Vienna. Since 1947, it has been part of the then newly founded state of Rhineland-Palatinate.

== Politics ==
=== Municipal council ===
The council is made up of 12 council members, who were elected by majority vote at the municipal election held on 7 June 2009, and the honorary mayor as chairman.

=== Coat of arms ===
The German blazon reads: Über goldenem Schildfuß mit rotem Sparrenbalken gespalten, vorn in Blau ein silberner Kirchturm mit schwarzem Dach, hinten in Silber ein rotes Lilienkreuz.

The municipality's arms might in English heraldic language be described thus: Per pale azure a churchtower argent with conical roof, door and two windows in pale sable and argent a cross flory gules, in a base Or a fess dancetty of the fourth.

The three charges all come from Laufeld's history. The churchtower on the dexter (armsbearer's right, viewer's left) side was part of the only parish church in the County of Manderscheid, and was important as a defensive structure as well. Given its importance, it has found its way into the municipality's arms. The cross with lilylike ends to its arms (“cross flory”) on the sinister (armsbearer's left, viewer's right) side was an heraldic charge borne by the Abbey of Echternach, once the village's landlord in the Middle Ages. The zigzag stripe (“fess dancetty”) in the escutcheon’s base was the heraldic device borne by the Counts of Manderscheid, who held sway here from the 14th century until the French Revolution.

With approval from the Regierungsbezirk government in Trier on 2 May 1983, Laufeld was granted the right to bear its own arms.

== Culture and sightseeing ==
Worth seeing in Laufeld is the Doll and Toy Museum (Puppen- und Spielzeugmuseum). On display are dolls and playthings from the last 100 years as well as everyday objects from the 1950s.

The Laufeld educational nature path teaches about the forest ecosystem.

== Economy and infrastructure ==
Laufeld is a state-recognized recreational municipality (Erholungsort).

There are two commercial areas with 20 firms and more than 500 jobs.

To the east runs the Autobahn A 1.

=== Education ===
In Laufeld there is one primary school.
