= Großlittgen =

- Municipality
- Coat of arms

- Location of Großlittgen within Bernkastel-Wittlich district
- Interactive map of Großlittgen
- Location within Germany Location within Rhineland-Palatinate
- Coordinates: 50°01′34.73″N 06°47′56.28″E
- Country: Germany
- State: Rhineland-Palatinate
- District: Bernkastel-Wittlich
- Municipal assoc.: Wittlich-Land

Government
  - Mayor (2020–24): Anton Klas

Area
  - Total: 13.20 km^{2} (5.10 sq mi)
- Elevation: 310 m (1,020 ft)

Population (2025-12-31)
  - Total: 1,072
  - Density: 81.21/km^{2} (210.3/sq mi)
- Time zone: UTC+01:00 (CET)
  - Summer (DST): UTC+02:00 (CEST)
- Postal codes: 54534
- Dialling codes: 06575
- Vehicle registration: WIL
- Website: www.grosslittgen.de

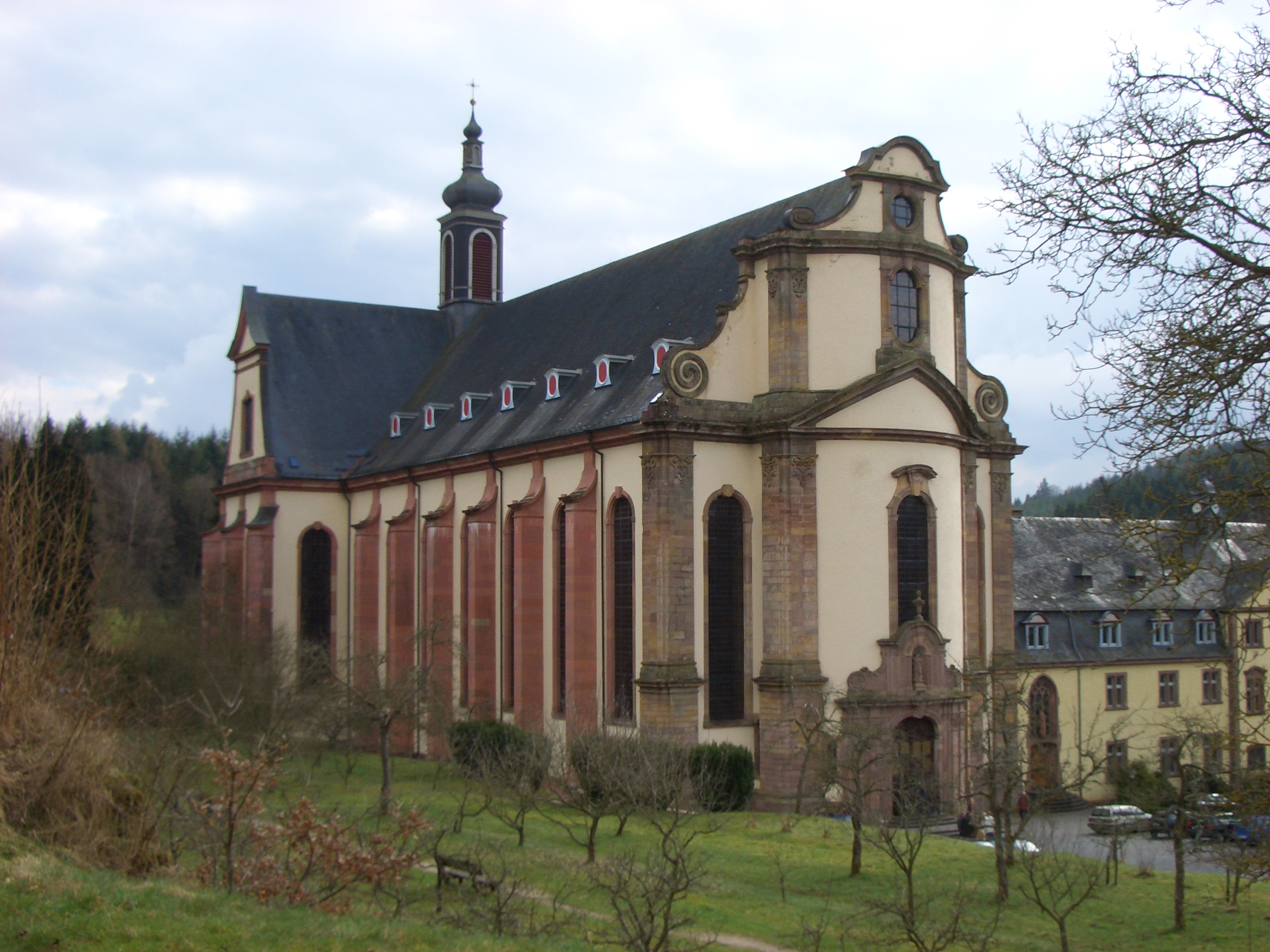
Himmerod Abbey Church

Großlittgen (in Eifel dialect: Gruhssleehtchen) is an Ortsgemeinde – a municipality belonging to a Verbandsgemeinde, a kind of collective municipality – in the Bernkastel-Wittlich district in Rhineland-Palatinate, Germany.

== Geography ==
The municipality lies in the Eifel and belongs to the Verbandsgemeinde Wittlich-Land.

== History ==
In 912, Großlittgen had its first documentary mention as Lutiaco. In 1134 or 1135, Bernhard von Clairvaux founded the Cistercian Himmerod Abbey near the village. During the French Revolutionary Wars, Großlittgen ended up under French rule beginning in 1794. In 1802, Himmerod Abbey was dissolved. In 1814 it was assigned to the Kingdom of Prussia at the Congress of Vienna. In 1922, the Abbey was founded anew by German Cistercian brothers from Marienstatt Abbey in the Westerwald. Since 1947, it has been part of the then newly founded state of Rhineland-Palatinate.

== Politics ==
=== Municipal council ===
The council is made up of 16 council members, who were elected by proportional representation at the municipal election held on 7 June 2009, and the honorary mayor as chairman.

The municipal election held on 7 June 2009 yielded the following results:

Year	WG Hubo	WG Antony	WG Schmitz	Total
2009	7	5	4	16 seats

=== Coat of arms ===
The German blazon reads: Unter silbernem Schildhaupt, darin ein rotes Balkenkreuz, durch eingeschweifte goldene Spitze, darin ein schwarzer Löwe, gespalten: rechts in Rot ein silbernes Schwert, links in Rot zwei ineinander geschlungene goldene Ringe.

The municipality's arms might in English heraldic language be described thus: Tierced in mantle, dexter gules a sword bendwise sinister argent, sinister gules two annulets embraced in pale Or, in base Or a lion rampant sable, in a chief of the second a cross of the first.

The cross charge in the chief is Electoral Trier's old armorial bearing. Großlittgen belonged to this state from 1341 to the late 18th century. The lion in base is the Lion of Luxembourg, recalling Großlittgen's time as a Luxembourgish fief; the family von Litiche from Luxembourg was enfeoffed with Großlittgen in the 12th century. The sword and also the division of the field, which resembles a mantle spread open at the bottom, are references to Saint Martin of Tours, long the municipality's patron saint, the former being his attribute and the latter a reference to the story of Martin cutting off a piece of his mantle for a beggar. The two linked rings are an armorial device borne by Himmerod Abbey.

The arms have been borne since 31 August 1987 when the Regierungsbezirk administration in Trier approved them.

== Culture and sightseeing ==
Worth seeing in Großlittgen is the Cistercian Himmerod Abbey.

== Economy and infrastructure ==
The state-recognized tourism municipality has one kindergarten and one primary school.

To the south runs the Autobahn A 60, and to the east, A 1.

== Notable people ==
- Carl Hau (1881-1926) murderer
- John J. Raskob (1879-1950)
