= Eifel dialects =

The Eifel dialects (German: Eifeler Mundarten) are those dialects spoken in the Eifel mountains of Germany. They divide into two language regions: the dialects spoken in the southern Eifel (Eifelisch) are part of the Moselle Franconian dialect group and closely resemble Luxembourgish. In the northern Eifel, by contrast, the dialects (Eifelplatt) belong to the Ripuarian dialect group and are more like Öcher Platt or Kölsch. In between there is a dialect continuum of typical transitions, whereby more or less every village speaks a little differently from its neighbours.

== Linguistic geography ==
The development of territorial structures in the Eifel since the Roman era is reflected in the development of the Eifel dialects. From a linguistic point of view, the Eifel can be divided into the Moselle Franconian and the Ripuarian dialect regions. The "Eifel language barrier", which separates the two dialects along a broad strip of territory, extends from the northern part of the Bitburg-Prüm, via Kronenburg, Blankenheim, Nettersheim, Altenahr and Ahrweiler along the Vinxtbach to its confluence with the Rhine at Bad Breisig. The old Roman border between Germania superior and Germania inferior ran here too. In the feudal period, the border between the Electorate of Trier and Electorate of Cologne also followed this line and, today, the border between North Rhine-Westphalia and Rhineland-Palatinate runs within this strip of land, which in linguistics is also referred to as the Vinxtbach Line or Dorp-Dorf Line. The Eifel dialect is also spoken in the neighbouring German-speaking Community of Belgium. Especially in the southern part of this region, which is also called the Belgian Eifel, the dialect has been able to preserve its importance in everyday life. Historically, these territories belonged mainly to the Duchy of Luxembourg (until 1815), while smaller elements belonged to the Electorate of Trier.

== Literature ==
- Fritz Koenn: "Von Abelong bos Zau dich Jong - Eifeler Wörter und Ausdrücke gesammelt und kurzweilig erklärt von Fritz Koenn". Helios, Aachen, 1995, ISBN 3-925087-59-1.
- Hans-Dieter Arntz: Jüdisches im Dialekt und Platt der Voreifel und Eifel – Aufarbeitung der Vergangenheit durch Erinnerung an sprachliche Relikte. In: Kreis Euskirchen (publ.): Jahrbuch des Kreises Euskirchen 2010, pp. 8–17.
