= Calmont (hill) =

Hill in Rhineland-Palatinate, Germany

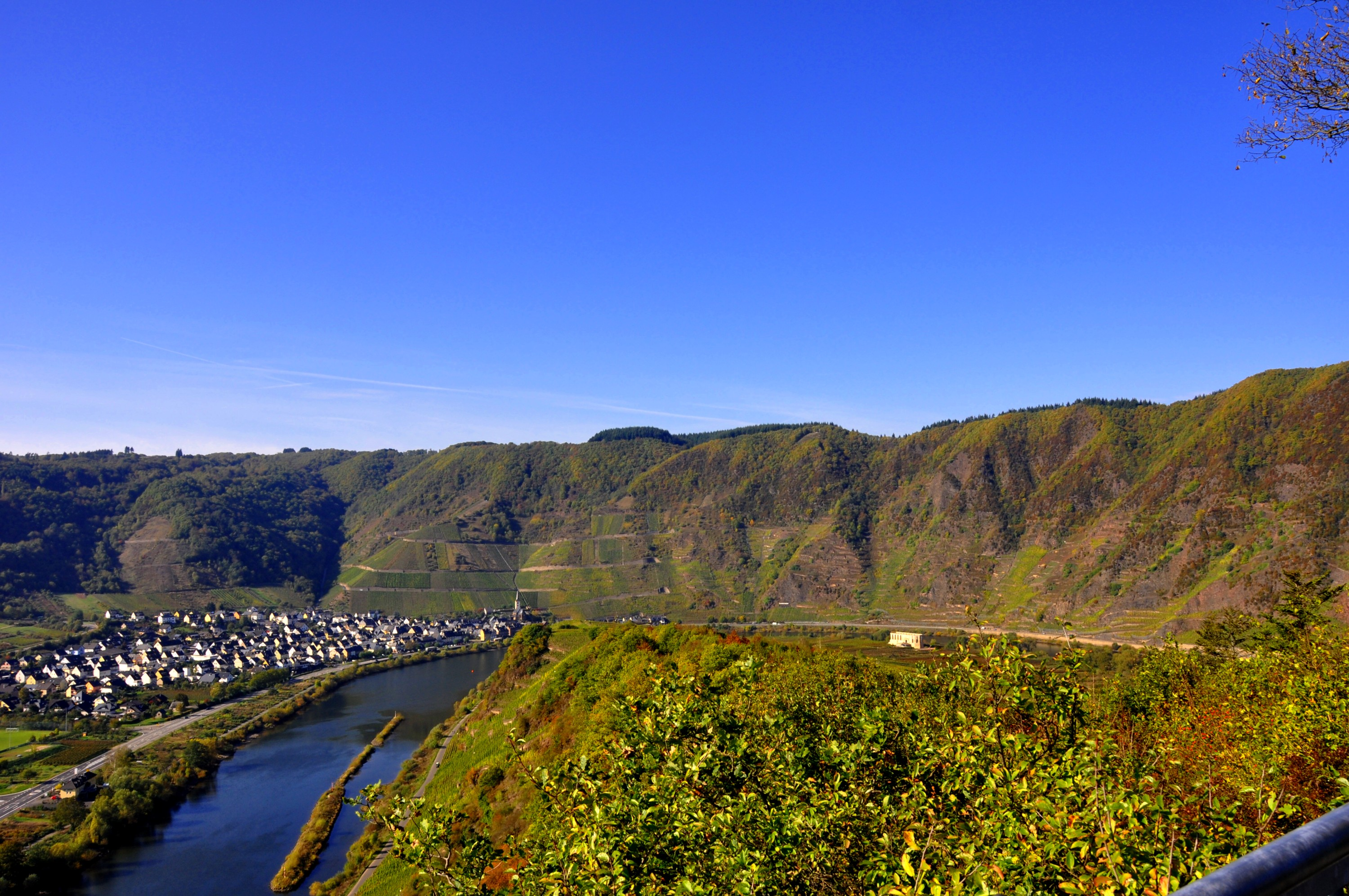
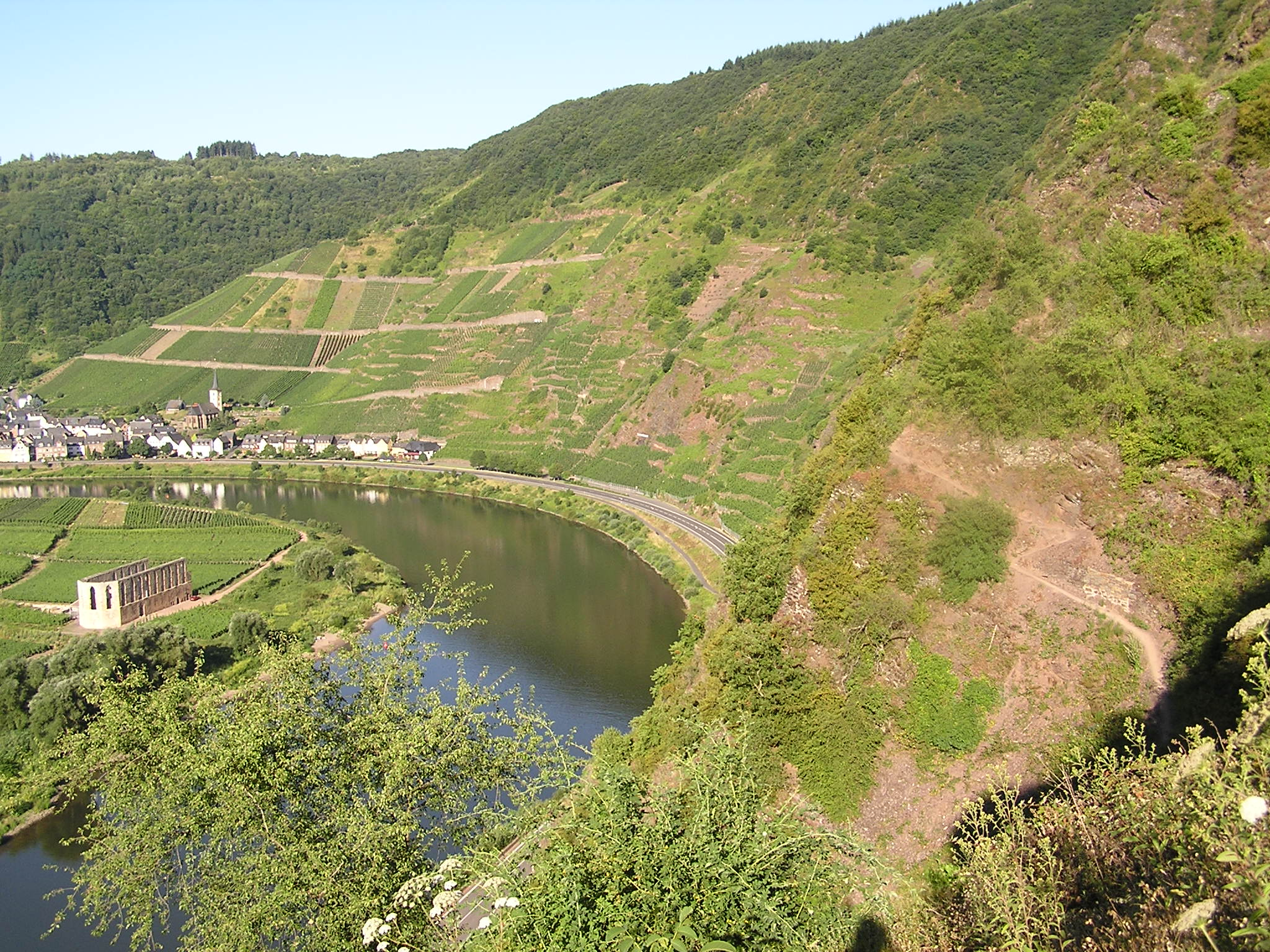
- Bremm, Moselle, Calmont Ruins of Stuben Abbey, Moselle and Calmont

Highest point
- Elevation: 380.6 m above sea level (NHN) (1,249 ft)
- Coordinates: 50°06′33″N 7°07′25″E

Geography
- Location within Rhineland-Palatinate
- Location: Bremm; Landkreis Cochem-Zell, Rheinland-Pfalz (Deutschland)
- Features: Gallo-Roman procession temple on the Calmont,, Vineyards: Bremmer Calmont and Ellerer Calmont,, Viewing plateau at the Monument to the Wartime Generation,, Calmont Trail, and Paragliding launch pad

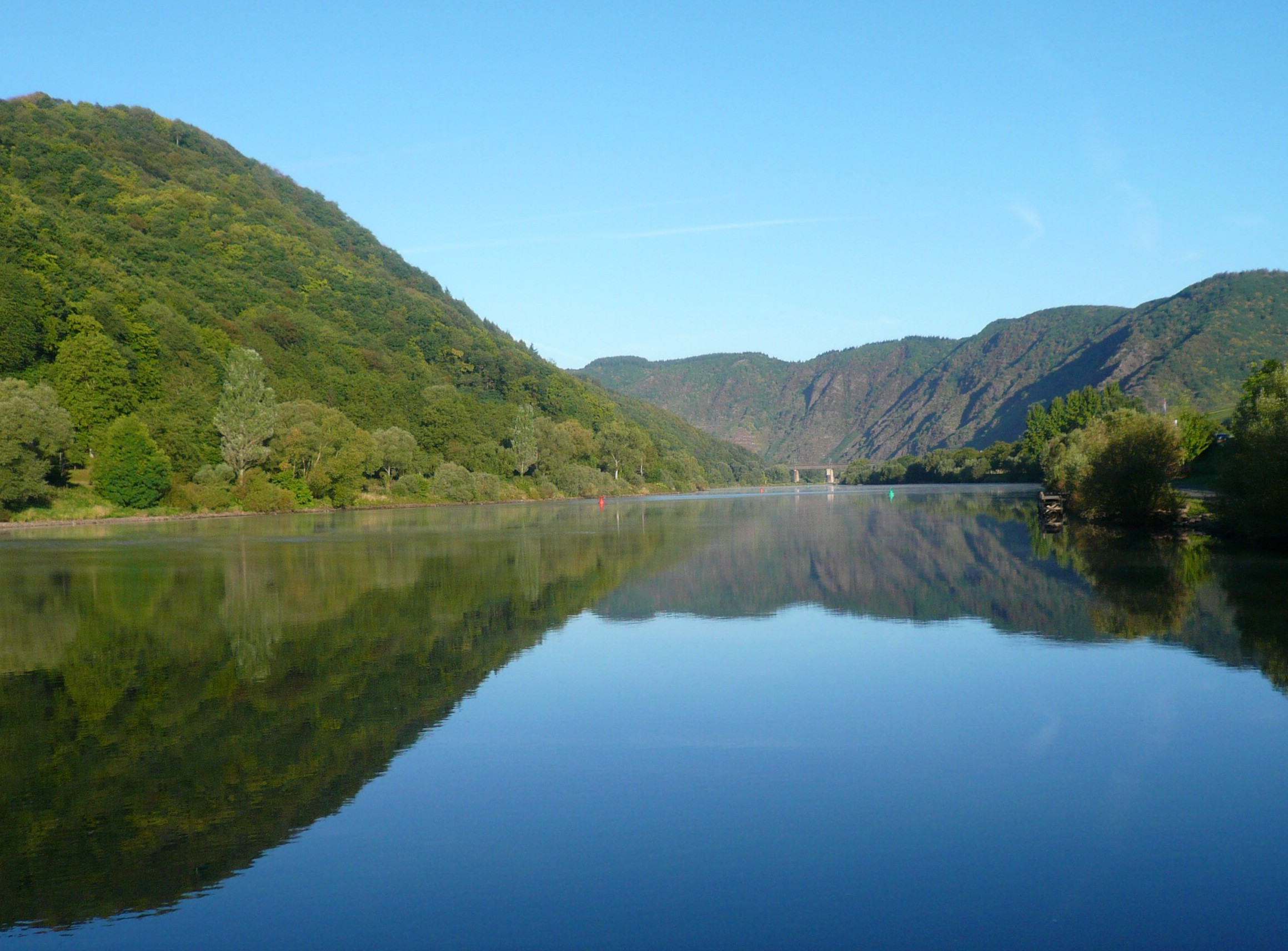
View up the Moselle to the Calmont and Moselle railway bridge

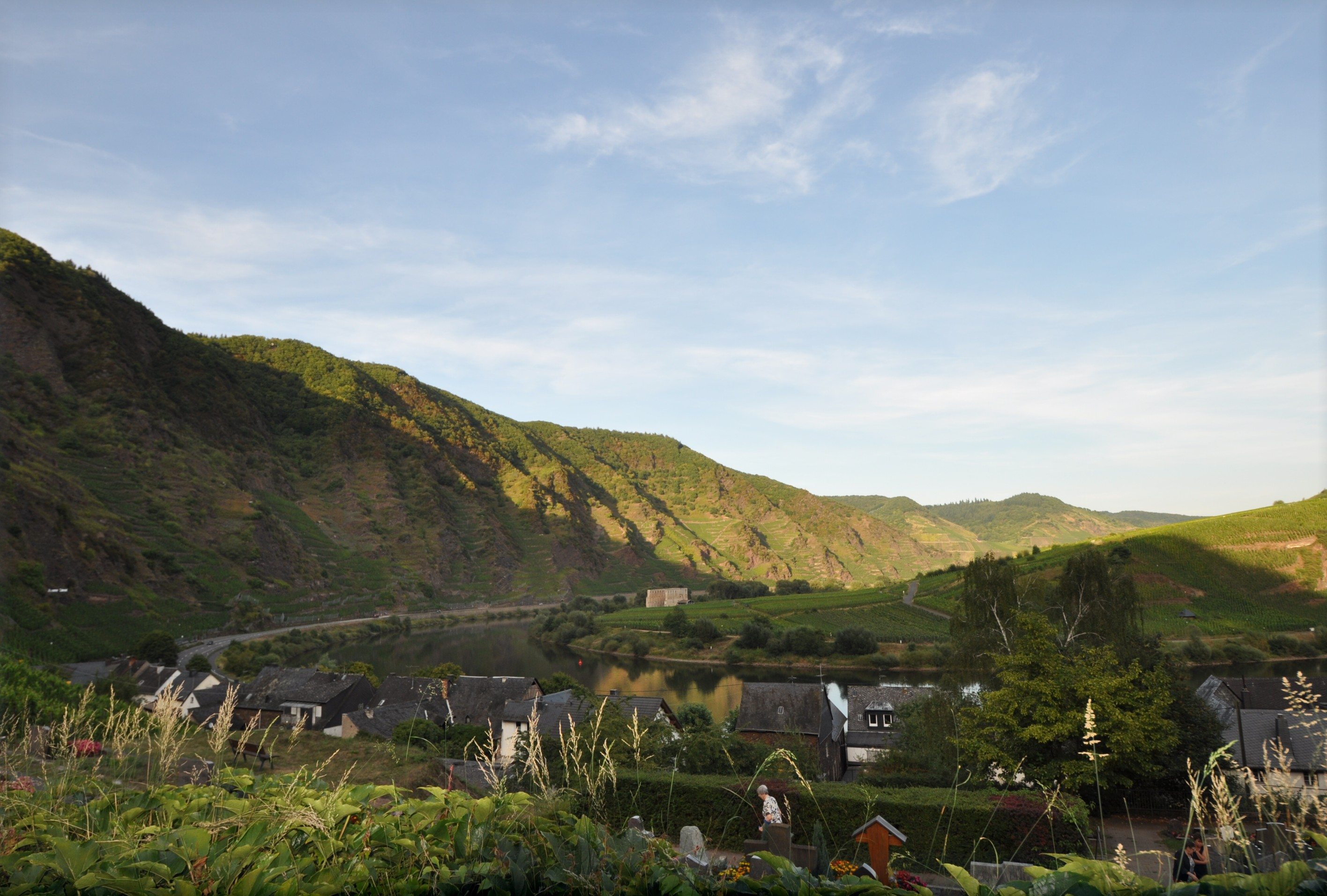
View downriver: Bremm, Calmont

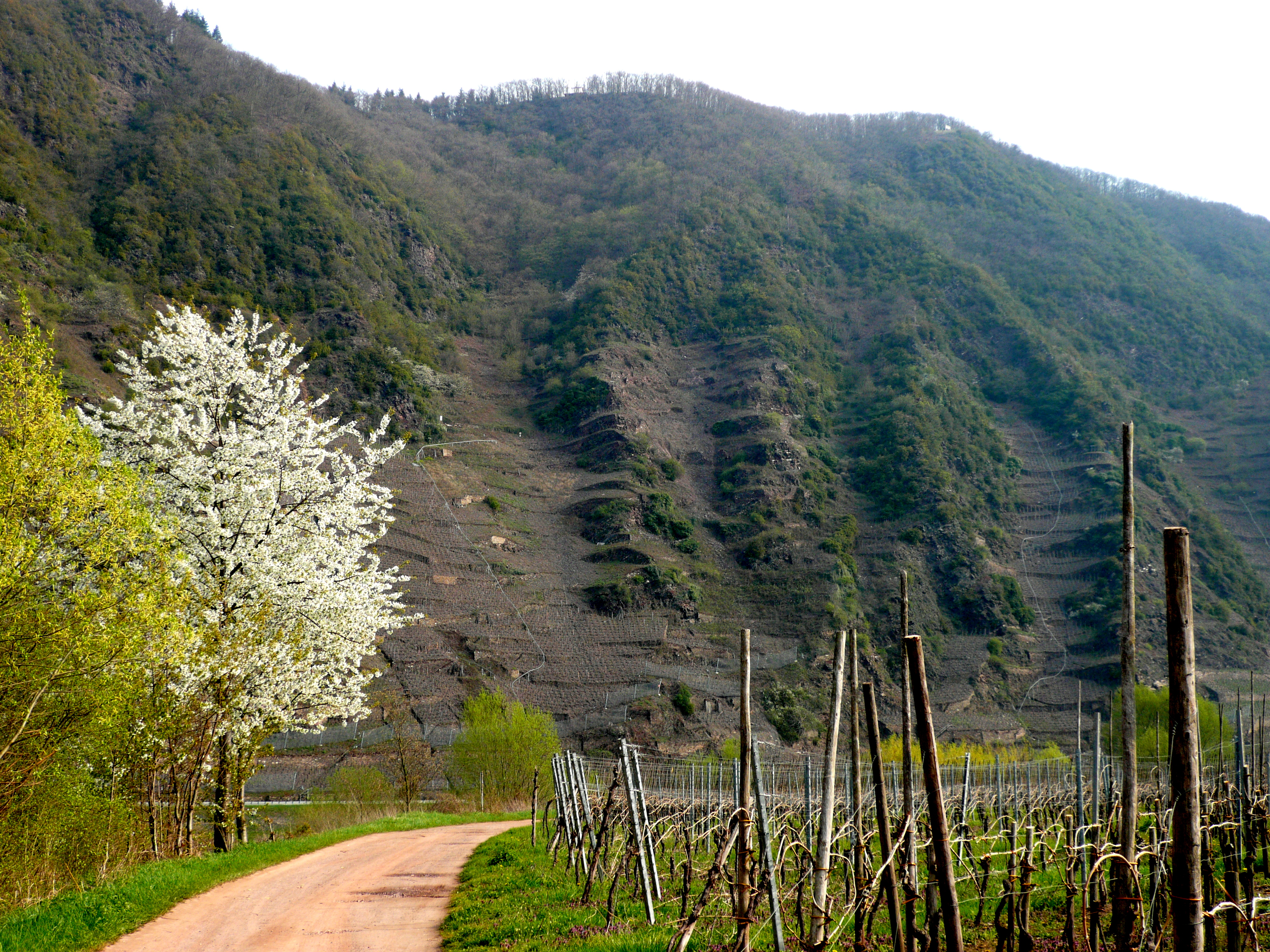
Calmont hillside

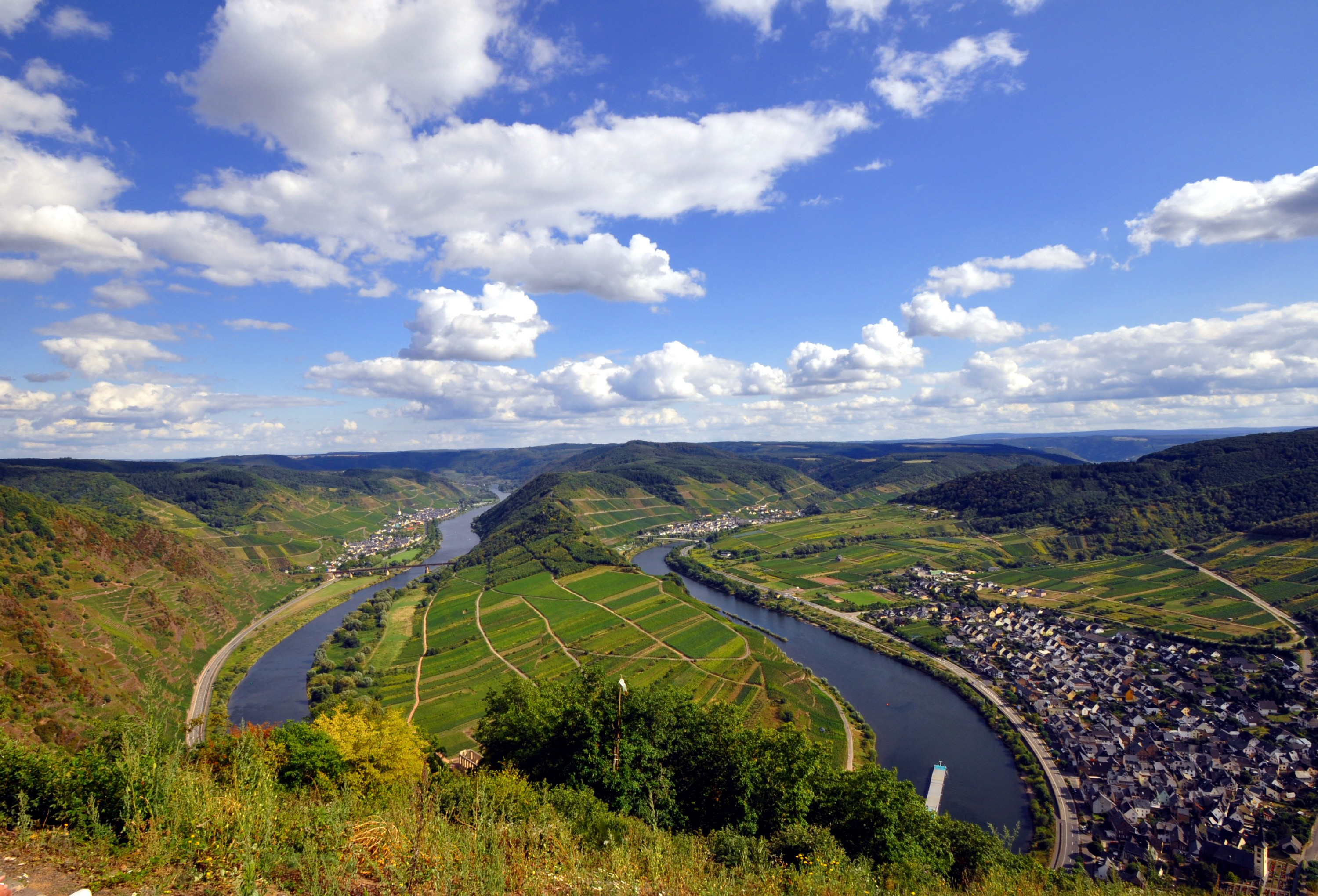
View from the viewing plateau at the Monument of the Wartime Generation of the loop in the Moselle near the ruined abbey of Stuben (below) with Ediger-Eller (l), Neef (centre) and Bremm (r)

The Calmont, also called the Calmond, between Bremm and Ediger-Eller in the county of Cochem-Zell in the German state of Rhineland-Palatinate, is a steep hill on the heights above the Moselle river to a height of 380.6 m above sea level (NHN). It lies within the Moselle wine region and is home to the vineyards of Bremmer Calmont and Ellerer Calmont which, with gradients of up to over 65º, are among the steepest vineyards in the world.

== Name ==
The name Calmont may be derived either:

- from the Latin calidus = "warm" and mons = "hill", i.e. "warm hill",
- from the Celtic kal = "hard", i.e. "rock hill"

== Geography ==
=== Location ===
The Calmont rises between Bremm to the south-southwest and Ediger-Eller further downstream to the southeast, both of which lie on the left bank of the river. Its summit is on the municipal boundary; its southern hillside belongs to Bremm, its northern and eastern slopes to Ediger-Eller. The Ellerbach stream flows to the north and east around the ridge and empties into the Moselle southeast of the hill. To the southwest the countryside climbs up to the Schafstall (423.0 m).

=== Natural region allocation ===
The Calmont belongs within the natural region major unit group of Moselle Valley (Moseltal, no. 25), in the major unit of the Central Moselle Valley (Mittleres Moseltal, 250), in the sub-unit of Middle Moselle (Mittelmosel, 250.3) and the natural region of Cochemer Krampen (250.33). The terrain drops northward into the Ellerbach valley and toward the northwest and west, while rising west-southwest to the Schafstall, entering the natural region of Gevenicher Hochfläche (270.02), part of the East Eifel major unit group (27), the Moselle Eifel major unit (270), and the Eastern Moselle Eifel sub-unit (Östliche Moseleifel, 270.0).

=== Height ===
The 380.6 m-high Calmont summit lies 293.1 metres above the Moselle, on which the lowest contour line on topographic maps is 87.5 m. It is also an average of about 270 metres above Bremm. Around 215 metres east-northeast of the summit is a spot height of 378.4 m.

== Conservation ==
The Calmont lies within the protected area of Moselle Region from Schweich to Koblenz (Moselgebiet von Schweich bis Koblenz, CDDA No. 323051; established in 1979; 1187.48 km^{2}), in the Special Area of Conservation of Hillsides and Side Valleys of the Lower Moselle (Moselhänge und Nebentäler der unteren Mosel, FFH No. 5809-301; 162.73 km^{2}) and in the bird reserve of Woods between Wittlich and Cochem (Wälder zwischen Wittlich und Cochem, VSG No. 5908-401; 235.52 km^{2}). Neither the SAC nor the bird reserve quite reach the banks of the Moselle river.

== Gallo-Roman Ambulatory Temple ==
On the summit of the Calmont there was a Roman hill shrine from the 2nd to around the 4th century AD. In 2005 the first archaeological excavations took place; they continued in 2008. In connexion with the excavations this Gallo-Roman ambulatory temple was reconstructed and opened on 16 May 2009

== Viniculture ==
In the late 20th century only part of the original vineyards were still being cultivated. The largest contiguous area is the Bremmer Calmont with 33 ha. On its steep slate hillsides grows a particularly good Riesling, however the vintners still have to use manual labour and muscle power (→ steep vineyards). After winegrowing had declined for decades on the Calmont massif for economic reasons, since 2005 several vintners have been ready to restock their vineyards. They hope that the greater profile of the location will enable them to market their products better. A wine estate has meanwhile offered to rent vine stocks.

== Monument and viewing plateau ==
665 metres (as the crown flies) west-southwest of the summit of the Calmont, near a spot height 372.5 m, is the Monument to the Wartime Generation (Mahnmal der Kriegsgeneration), a 12-metre-high summit cross that was erected around 1970 and is visible from a long way off. Beside the hut, open from Easter to October as a Straußwirtschaft, an observation plateau provides good views, particularly of the Moselle loop 285 m below, the nearby ruins of Stuben Abbey, and downstream the villages of Neef, Bremm and Ediger-Eller.

== Transport and Hiking ==
Along the southern foot of the Calmont, running from west to east between the Moselle villages of Bremm and Ediger-Eller is the B 49 federal highway. East to southeast of the ridge is the 4,205-metre-long Kaiser Wilhelm Tunnel which runs from north-northeast to south-southwest and carries the Moselle railway from Cochem to the station of Ediger-Eller and then over a 281-metre-long bridge over the Moselle.

On the Calmont runs the Calmont Klettersteig, which was laid out by the German Alpine Club and opened on 4 May 2002 and on which can discover more about the hills and their flora and fauna.

== Paragliding ==
Near the Monument to the Wartime Generation is a launch area for paragliders who can fly over the Moselle valley in suitable wind conditions. The Calmont massif is like a huge concave mirror in the Moselle valley and, with its southerly orientation and slate bedrock, offers ideal conditions for the creation of thermal upcurrents.
