= Moselle Eifel =

Mountain range

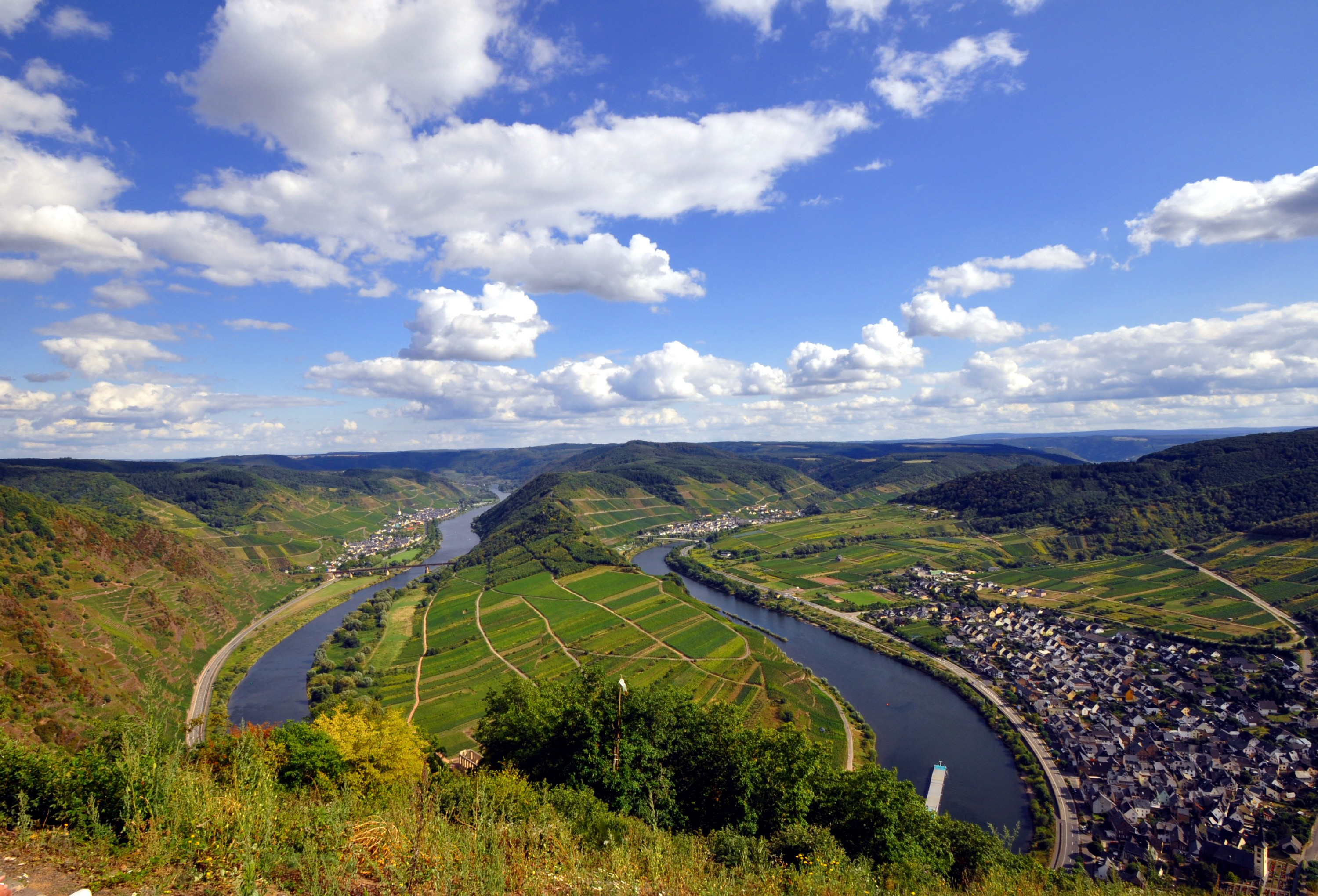
View from the plateau at the Monument of the Wartime Generation of the loop in the Moselle near Stuben Abbey (below) with Ediger-Eller (l), Neef (centre) and Bremm (r)

The Moselle Eifel (German: Moseleifel) forms the southeastern strip of the East Eifel to the left of the Moselle from the city of Trier downstream as far as Moselkern; in the southeast it does not reach as far as the Moselle Valley. It lies exclusively within the German state of Rhineland-Palatinate and is a truncated highland, roughly half of which is forested.

== Geography ==
=== Location ===
The Moselle Eifel runs in a southwest to northeast direction, northwest along the Moselle river, sometimes away from the river, between Trier-Ehrang, at the confluence of the Kyll and the Moselle, and Moselkern at the confluence of the Elzbach with the same Rhine tributary. The hills of the Moselle Eifel are lower than those of the adjacent and very ancient Volcanic Eifel to the north and only exceed 400 m above sea level (NHN) in a few places, reaching a maximum of 423 m above NHN at Schafstall near Bremm. On the far, southeastern side of the Moselle Valley with its many meanders and well known castles rises the somewhat higher hill range of the Hunsrück.

=== Natural region grouping ===
The Moselle Eifel forms a major natural region unit (270) within the major unit group of the East Eifel (no. 27) die Haupteinheit Moseleifel (270) and has the BfN no. 27001. It is divided as follows:

270 Moselle Eifel (Moseleifel, 790.0552 km²)

- 270.0 Eastern Moselle Eifel (Östliche Moseleifel, 269.3467 km²)
  - 270.00 Elz Valley (Elztal, 26.7871 km²)
  - 270.01 Kaiseresch Eifel Perimeter (Kaisersescher Eifelrand, 104.1525 km²)
  - 270.02 Gevenich Upland (Gevenicher Hochfläche, 138,4071 km²)
- 270.1 Lower Ueßbach Valley (Unteres Ueßbachtal, 20.6023 km²)
- 270.2 Kondelwald (24.8771 km²)
- 270.3 Öffling Upland (Öfflinger Hochfläche, 136.6507 km²)
- 270.4 Middle Lieser Valley (Mittleres Liesertal, 25.7156 km²)
- 270.5 Southern Volcanic Eifel (Südliche Vulkaneifel, 164.1671 km²)
  - 270.50 Daun-Manderscheid Volcanoes (Daun-Manderscheider Vulkanberge, 83.5247 km²)
  - 270.51 Daun Maar Region (Dauner Maargebiet, 80.6424 km²)
- 270.6 Wittlich Hedge Land (Wittlicher Heckenland, 105.9256 km²)
  - 270.60 Naurath Horst (Naurather Horst, 19.8545 km²)
  - 270.61 Arenrath Upland (Arenrather Hochfläche, 15.2233 km²)
  - 270.62 Littgen Upland (Littgener Hochfläche, 70.8478 km²)
- 270.7 Meulenwald (42.7701 km²)

The Moselle Eifel lies between these major natural regional units looking downstream along the Moselle:

in the direction of the Eifel:

- 260 Mosel-Saar-Gau and East Luxembourg Gutland (Ostluxemburger Gutland) – the southwestern part of the Moselle Eifel, from Trier-Ehrang to Binsfeld
- 277 Kyllburg Forest Eifel (Kyllburger Waldeifel) – middle section of the Moselle Eifel, from Niederkail to Waldkönigen
- 276 Limestone Eifel (Kalkeifel) – middle section of the Moselle Eifel, near Waldkönigen
- 271 Eastern High Eifel (Östliche Hocheifel) – northern part of the Moselle Eifel, from Waldkönigen to Reudelsterz
- 291 Middle Rhine Basin (Mittelrheinisches Becken) – northern part of the Moselle Eifel, from Reudelsterz to Moselkern

the direction of and along the Moselle:

- 250 Middle Moselle Valley (Mittleres Moseltal) – southwest to northwest part of the Moselle Eifel, from Trier-Ehrang to Moselkern

=== Hills and viewing points ===
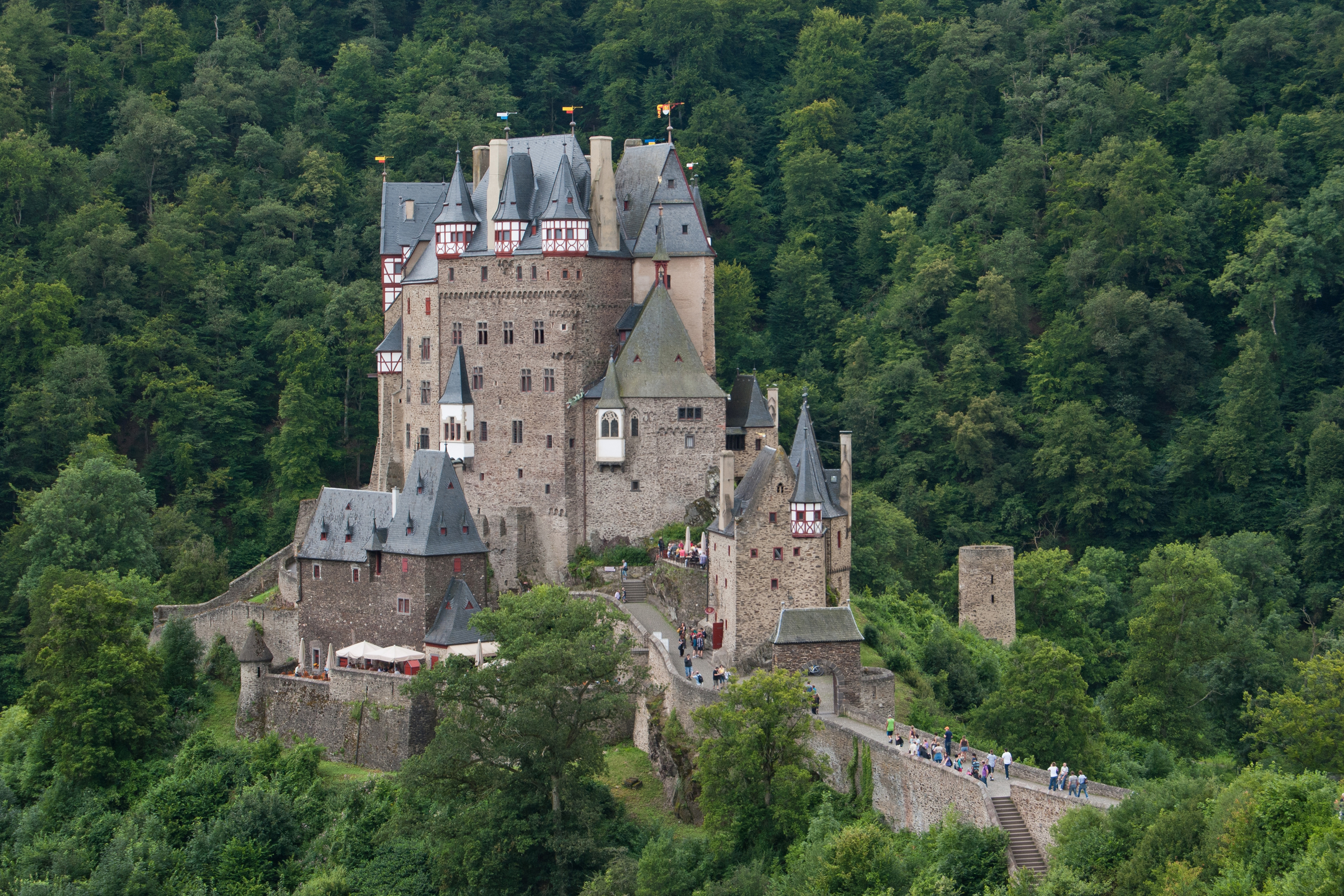
Eltz Castle

The hills and viewing points left of the Moselle Valley include the following (in downstream order) – with heights in metres (m) above sea level (NHN) (unless otherwise stated:)

- Rothenberg (365.3 m), near Ürzig
- Fieberberg (ca. 400 m), near the river bend at Traben-Trarbach
- Hill on which Arras Castle stands (250.6 m) and the Barl (282.5 m), near the river bend at Kaimt/Barl
- Calmont (hill) (380.6 m) und Schafstall (423.0 m), near the river bend at Bremm
- Klottenberg and Ellerberg (352 and 385 m)
- Eltz Castle (143.9 m), near Wierschem

Further inland towards the Volcanic Eifel are the:

- Eickelslay (390 m), with a panoramic view
- Falkenley (413.7 m), near Bad Bertrich, north of the Kondelwald
- Asberg (354.8 m), near Salmrohr

== Description ==
The region is a popular holiday area and part of the Middle Moselle wine growing region. This is characterised by a large number of small, prestigious vineyards that are family-owned. As a result of the relatively steep Moselle Valley the Moselle Wine Road, while the railway only travels along the valley as far as the first river bend at Zell and then ascends the hill upland.

== Literature and external links ==
- General map of Germany 1:200,000, Sheet 12
- Moseleifel Touristik, at moseleifel-touristik.de
