= Wittlich =

- Town
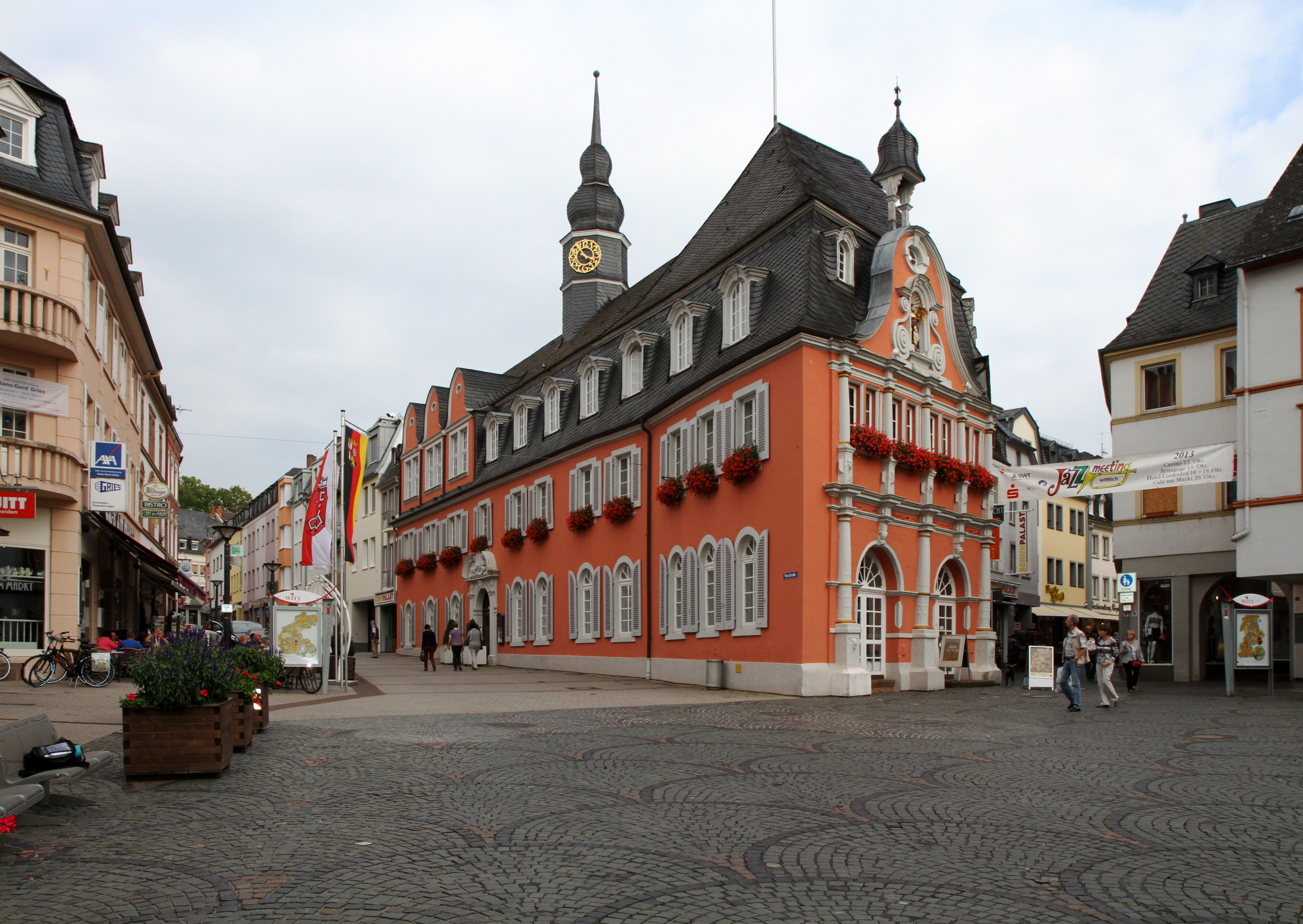
- Old Town Hall

- Coat of arms

- Location of Wittlich within Bernkastel-Wittlich district
- Interactive map of Wittlich
- Location within Germany Location within Rhineland-Palatinate
- Coordinates: 49°59′13″N 06°53′23″E
- Country: Germany
- State: Rhineland-Palatinate
- District: Bernkastel-Wittlich
- Subdivisions: 6

Government
  - Mayor (2017–25): Joachim Rodenkirch (CDU)

Area
  - Total: 49.63 km^{2} (19.16 sq mi)
- Elevation: 160 m (520 ft)

Population (2025-12-31)
  - Total: 19,186
  - Density: 386.6/km^{2} (1,001/sq mi)
- Time zone: UTC+01:00 (CET)
  - Summer (DST): UTC+02:00 (CEST)
- Postal codes: 54516
- Dialling codes: 06571
- Vehicle registration: WIL
- Website: www.wittlich.de

Wittlich (German pronunciation: [ˈvɪtlɪç]; Moselle Franconian: Wittlech) is a town in Rhineland-Palatinate, in western Germany, the seat of the Bernkastel-Wittlich district. Its historic town centre and the beauty of the surrounding countryside make the town a centre for tourism in southwest Germany.

Wittlich is the middle centre for a feeder area of 56 municipalities in the Eifel and Moselle area with a population of roughly 64,000. With some 18,000 inhabitants, Wittlich is the biggest town between Trier and Koblenz and the fourth biggest between Mainz and the Belgian border.

== Geography ==
=== Location ===
The town lies in the South Eifel on the River Lieser in a side valley of the Moselle on the northern edge of the Wittlich Depression. This stretch of country is bounded in the west by the low mountains of the Moselle Eifel and in the east by the Moselle valley.

=== Constituent communities ===
Wittlich's Stadtteile or Ortsbezirke (districts or suburbs), besides the main centre, also called Wittlich, are Bombogen, Dorf, Lüxem, Neuerburg, and Wengerohr, each of which was a self-administering municipality. until 7 June 1969.

== History ==
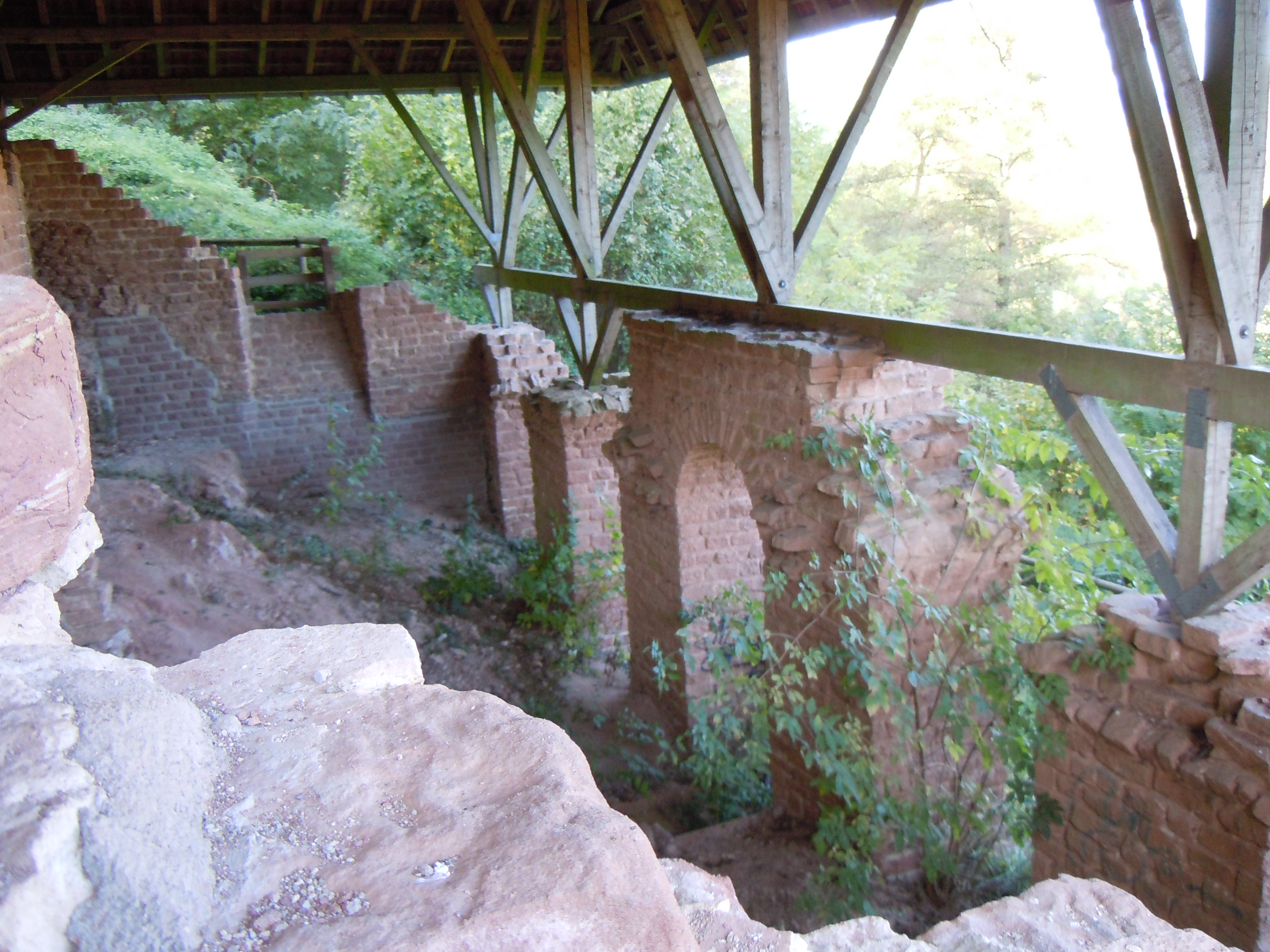
Ruins of ancient Roman villa in Wittlich

The oldest known remnants of human settlement activity come from the third millennium BC.

In Roman times there stood right on the River Lieser, where the autobahn bridge is now, a stately villa rustica or countryside villa.

In 1065, Wittlich had its first documentary mention. In 1300, Archbishop-Elector Diether von Nassau of Trier granted Wittlich town rights. It had long been assumed, however, that Wittlich had already been granted town rights in 1291, leading to the 700th-anniversary celebrations in 1991.

In the middle ages, the prince-electors of Trier constructed a castle in Wittlich, Burg Ottenstein. This castle was replaced in the 18th century by a hunting lodge, Schloss Philippsfreude, which was destroyed during the times of the French Revolution.

In 1912, Germany's first youth prison was built in Wittlich, which also still borders on the Justizvollzugsanstalt Wittlich (“Wittlich Correctional Facility”).

During World War II, in 1940, a forced labour camp for French prisoners of war and a subcamp of the Hinzert concentration camp were established in the town. The latter held mostly Polish, Italian and Luxembourgish prisoners, and John Mersch, the pre-war United States vice-consul in Luxembourg.

== Building projects in town ==
In 2009, the town of Wittlich was included in the programme Aktive Stadtzentren (“Active Town Centres”) of the state of Rhineland-Palatinate. Since then, some investors have been interested in the town of Wittlich.

- On 12 November of the same year, the Schlossgalerie was opened, in which C&A, Müller, Ernsting's Family and Depot all have locations. There is still somewhere between 600 and 1 500 m^{2} of available free floor area.
- In mid March, work began on the project Altstadt, die neue (roughly “New Old Town”). It comprises three new houses in which later, on the ground floors, there will be 220 m^{2} of storage room and a passage, while upstairs there will be room for medical practices and flats. Furthermore, there will be an underground garage with 20 parking places. Work is set to finish on this project in mid-2011.
- Planned for Schlossstraße in Wittlich is a new theatre-cinema with four big and modern cinema halls and one big theatre hall for 600 theatregoers. There is to be a further 500 m^{2} for dining, 850 m^{2} of commercial space and 1 500 m^{2} for flats. A new four-floor building is foreseen for this project. Its name will be Schlosstheater.

== Politics ==
=== Town council ===
The council is made up of 32 honorary council members, and a full-time mayor as chairman.

Recent municipal elections have yielded the following results:

	SPD	CDU	FDP	GRÜNE	Linke	FWG	Total
2014	8	14	2	4	1	3	32 seats
2009	8	13	3	4	1	3	32 seats
2004	9	14	3	3	–	3	32 seats
1999	10	16	2	2	–	2	32 seats

=== Coat of arms ===
The German blazon reads: In rotem Feld parallel nebeneinander zwei aufrecht, mit dem Schlüsselbart nach oben voneinander abgekehrte silberne Schlüssel mit übereinandergelegten Griffen, wobei der linke über dem rechten angeordnet ist. Die Mauerkrone ist Zierelement des Wappens: ein Zinnenturm mit offenem Tor in der Mitte zwischen Mauern und Zinnen.

The town's arms might in English heraldic language be described thus: Gules two keys palewise addorsed, the wards to chief and the bow of the dexter surmounting that of the sinister, argent, ensigning the shield a tower with an open gateway and flanking walls, the whole embattled, of the second.

The German blazon identifies the “left” key as the one that surmounts the other, although the example shown at the town's own website clearly shows the dexter key surmounting the sinister. This may arise from a common misunderstanding about heraldry, in which left and right – or sinister and dexter – are told from the armsbearer's point of view, not the viewer's.

The example of the arms shown at the town's own website shows the crenellated (“embattled”) tower on top of the escutcheon; however, the example at Heraldry of the World shows the arms without this. This same webpage also shows a coat of arms for Wittlich which apparently appeared in the old Coffee Hag albums. It might be described as “Argent two keys per saltire, the wards to chief, the one in bend sinister surmounting the other, azure.” In other words, the field tincture was silver (“argent”) instead of red (“gules”), and the keys were not only blue instead of silver, but also crossed to form an X (“per saltire”).

Whichever way the keys are arranged, they symbolize Saint Peter, who was the patron saint of the Electorate of Trier, to which Wittlich belonged until 1794. The current tinctures were the ones borne by Trier, whereas the ones in the Coffee Hag image were those borne by the House of Wittelsbach.

The town's first great seal, from the time just after Wittlich had been raised to town, showed a crenellated tower over an open gate between two turrets, each with a roundle high on its wall. The court seal from the early 14th century, on the other hand, showed a two-key charge quite similar to the one in today's arms, thus providing the model for the coat of arms now borne by the town.

The crenellated tower on top of the escutcheon was only “rediscovered” much later.

=== Town partnerships ===
Wittlich fosters partnerships with the following places:

- Boxtel, North Brabant, Netherlands
- Brunoy, Essonne, France, since 1979
- Wellingborough, Northamptonshire, England, United Kingdom since 1993
- (Germany) Zossen, Teltow-Fläming, Brandenburg (“friendly relations”) since German reunification
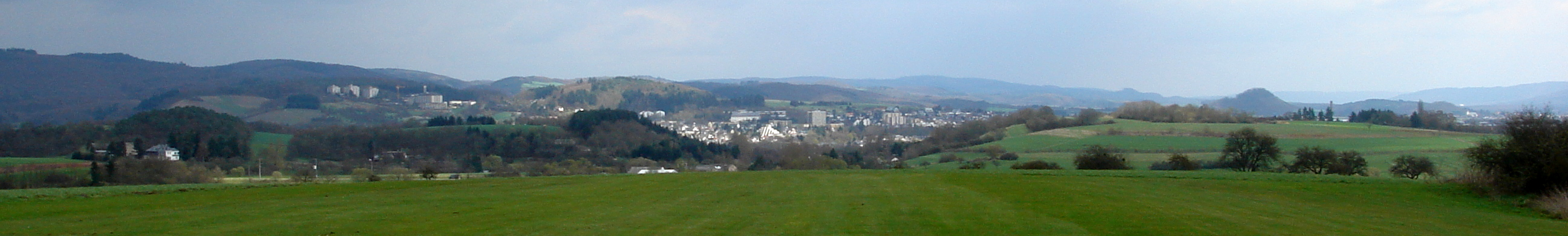
View from the Fintenhügel (hill) over the town of Wittlich

== Culture and sightseeing ==
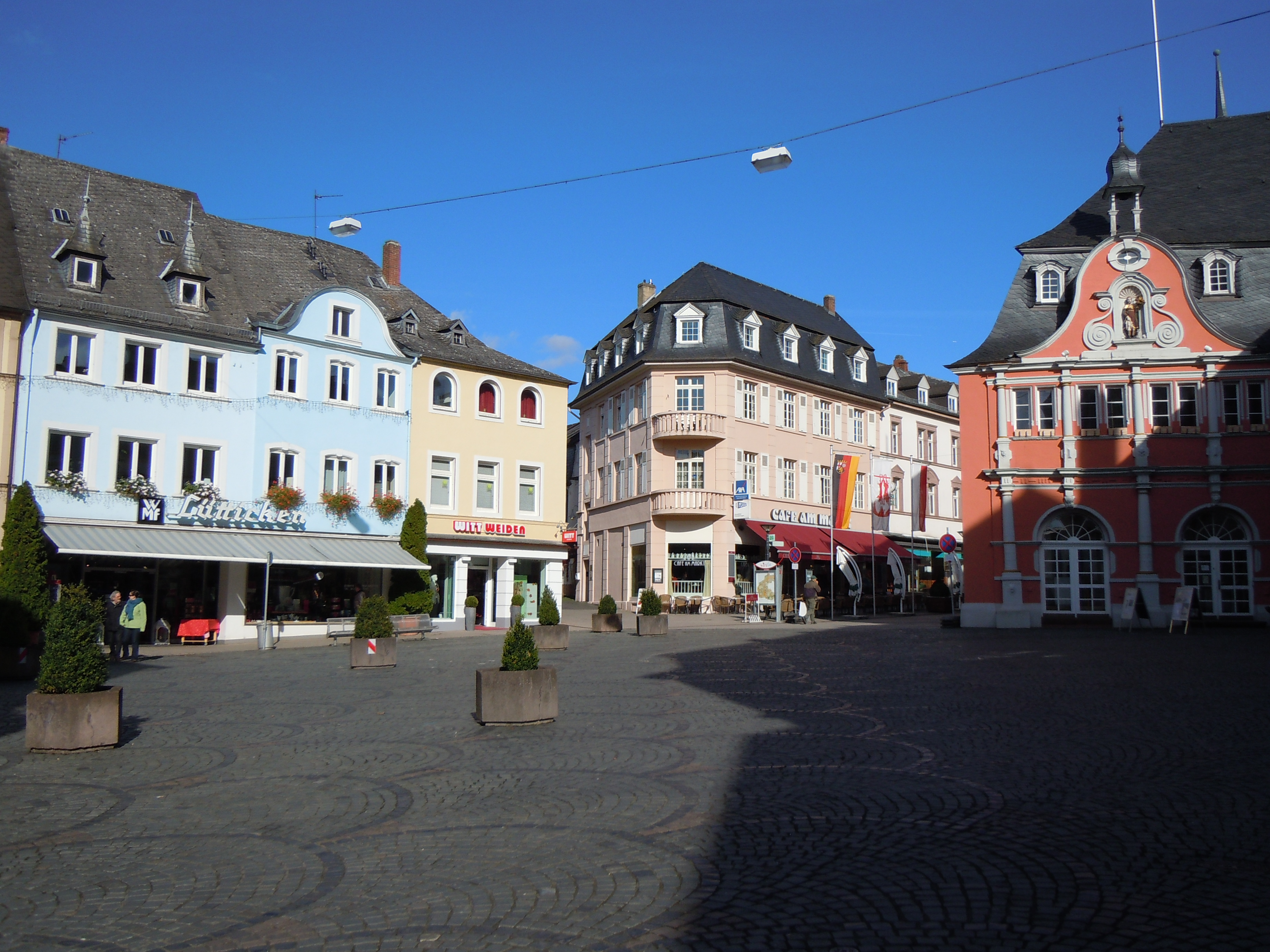
Market place in Wittlich

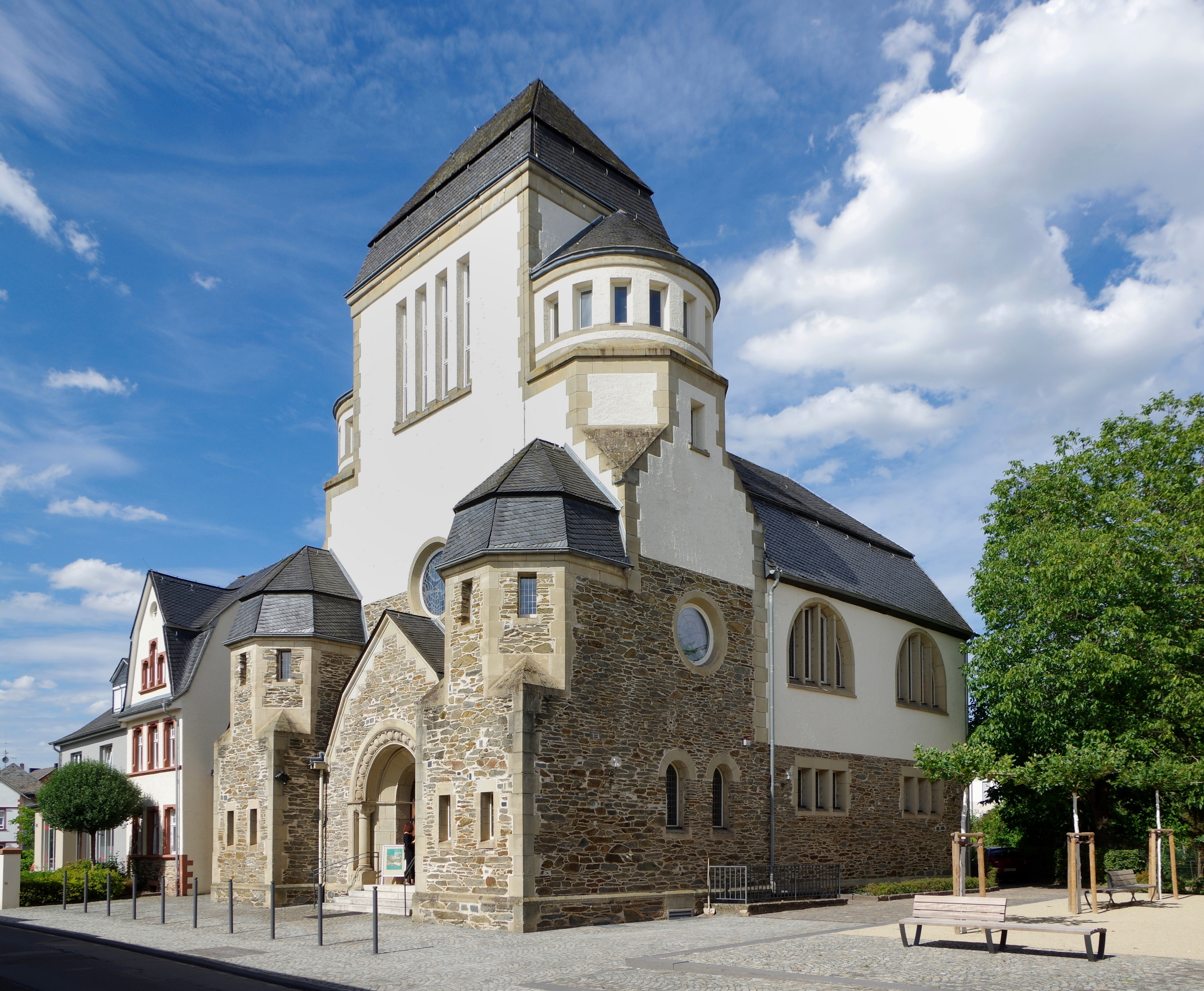
Former synagogue on Himmeroder Straße

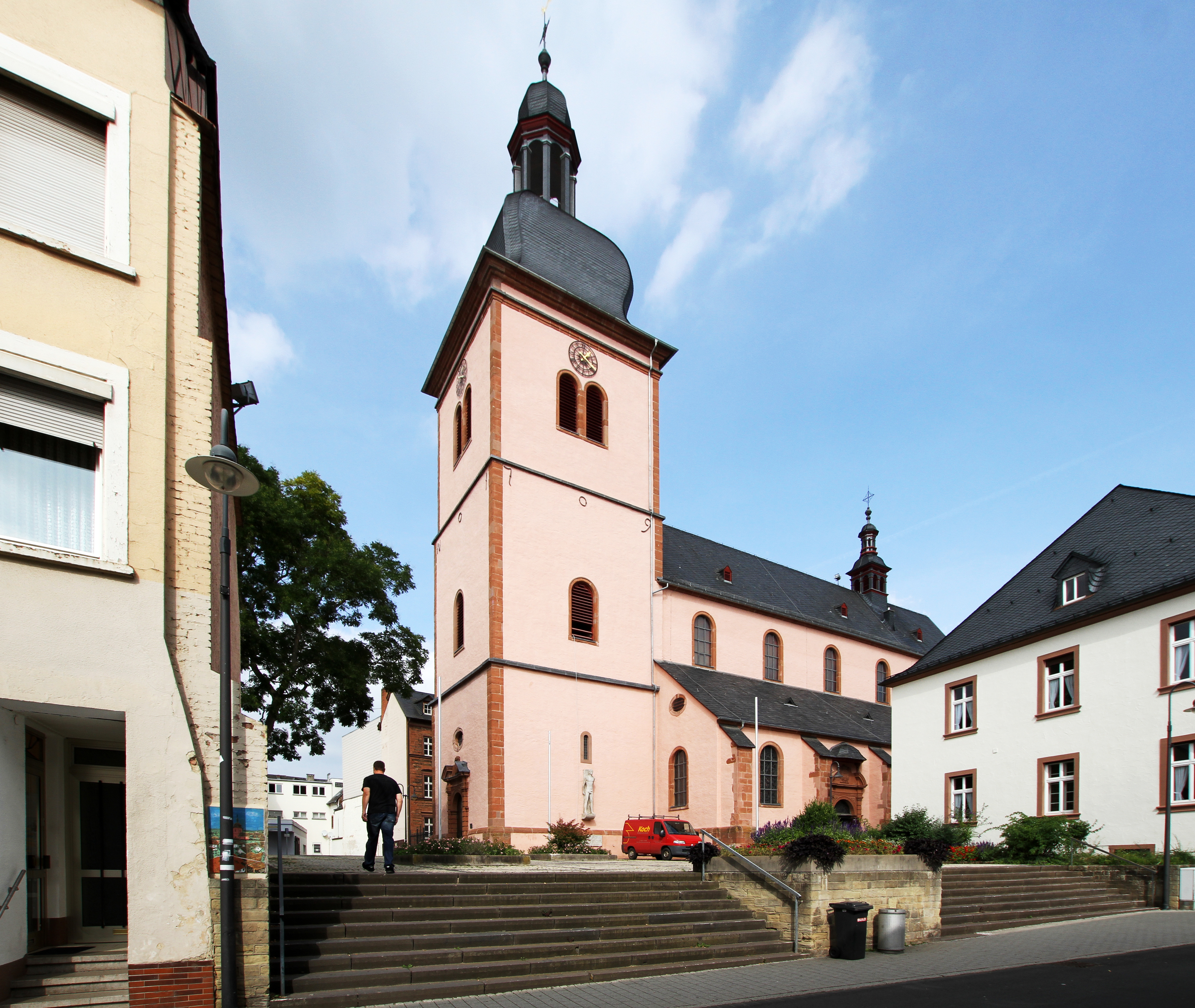
Baroque church saint Marc in Wittlich

=== Sightseeing ===
- Old Town Hall on the marketplace with the Alten Rathaus museum for modern art. It was previously the Georg-Meistermann-Museum until the city held an exhibition there by Nazi artist Hans Schell. The Meistermann family withdrew his name in protest but many of his great works are still there - including the Four Horsemen of The Apocalypse.
- Former synagogue, today a cultural and conference centre with a permanent exhibit on “Jewish Life in Wittlich”
- Türmchen (“Little Tower”), part of an old town gate
- Baroque Saint Mark's Parish Church (Pfarrkirche St. Markus)
- Remnants of a Roman villa between Wittlich and Altrich, beside the A 1
- Saint Paul's Mission House (Missionshaus St. Paul) of the Divine Word Missionaries (closed in autumn 2005)
- Haus Daus at Karrstraße 19-21, among Wittlich's oldest townsmen's houses

=== Regular events ===
Wittlich's Shrovetide festivities – Fastnacht – are outfitted each year by the two Carnival clubs, Schääl Saidt e.V. and Narrenzunft Rot-Weiß e.V. (“Fools’ Guild”). On the third weekend in August, the Säubrennerkirmes (“Sow Burner Fair”) is held; it is one of Rhineland-Palatinate's biggest folk festivals and was begun in 1951, based on the mediaeval Säubrennersage (a legend that tells of a sow that inadvertently allowed a siege force to enter Wittlich, sack it and burn it down after she ate the carrot that the gatekeeper had used instead of the bolt, which he could not find; all swine in the town were accordingly punished with burning – meaning, in effect, a huge pork barbecue). In October, Wittlich also holds Rhineland-Palatinate's biggest Oktoberfest.

=== Offener Kanal Wittlich ===
Wittlich also has a public access channel, the Offener Kanal Wittlich, which several times weekly reports on local news, events and suchlike.

== Economy and infrastructure ==
=== Economy ===
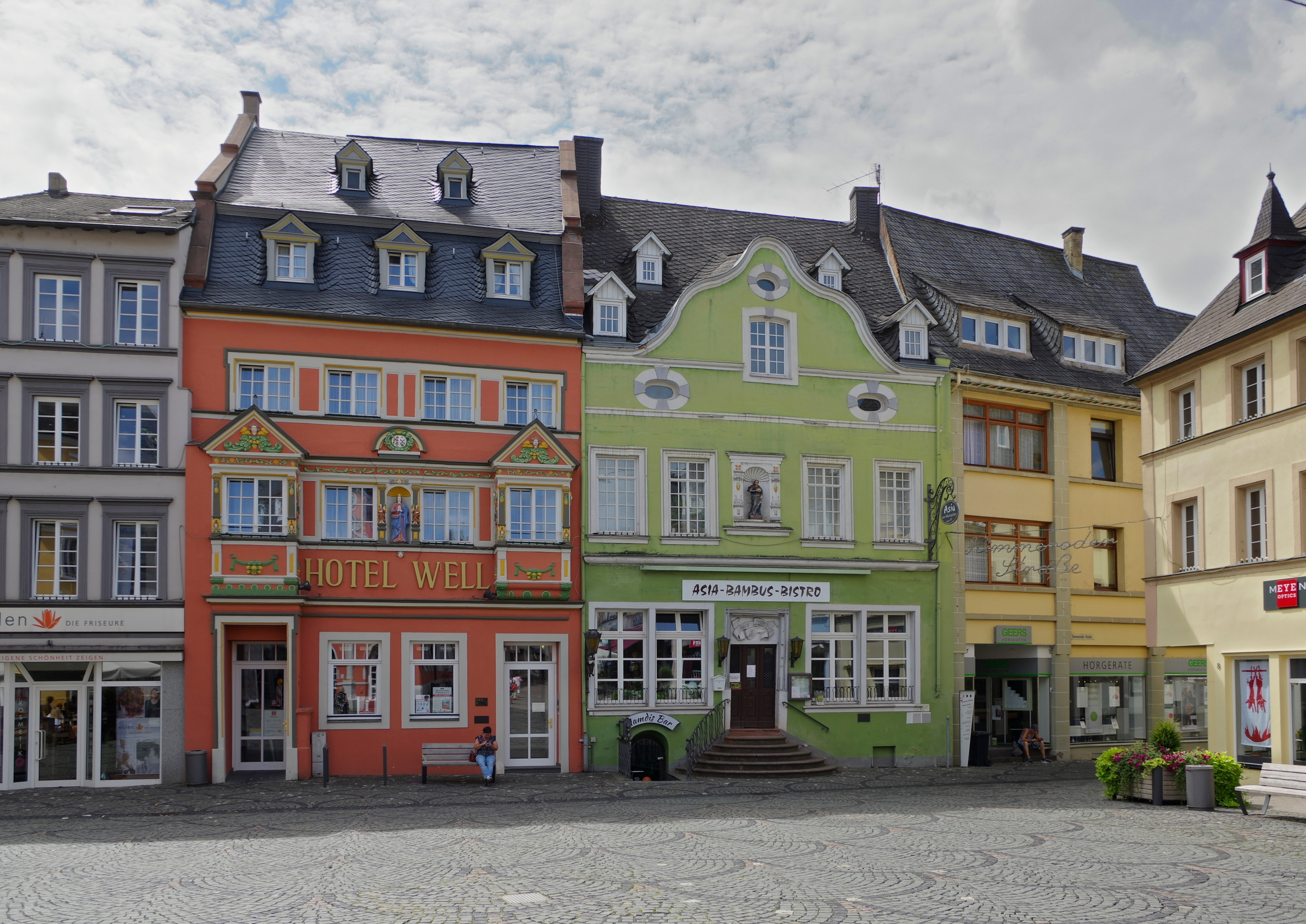
Set of houses on the marketplace

In Wittlich, counting only workers on the social welfare contribution rolls, 14,500 people have jobs. This rises to more than 16,000 if officials and the self-employed are counted, making Wittlich's job density about 852 for each thousand inhabitants, and putting Wittlich itself in the very highest group of towns in Rhineland-Palatinate. Wittlich's importance as an economic and tourism centre is favoured by its location on two autobahns and by its mainline railway station on the Koblenz-Trier railway line.

=== Established businesses ===
- Dr. August Oetker Nahrungsmittel KG runs one of its biggest food freezing works in the outlying centre of Wengerohr.
- Goodyear Dunlop Tires Germany GmbH runs a plant in Wittlich which has been specialized in truck tire production.
- On 12 November 2009, the Schlossgalerie opened in Wittlich in which C&A, Müller and Ernsting's Family, among others, have locations.
- The Chinese firm Heng Feng, which makes furniture and fishing tackle, has its only European location in Wittlich through its daughter company Westfield Outdoors.
- The Bungert department store is Rhineland-Palatinate's biggest family business.

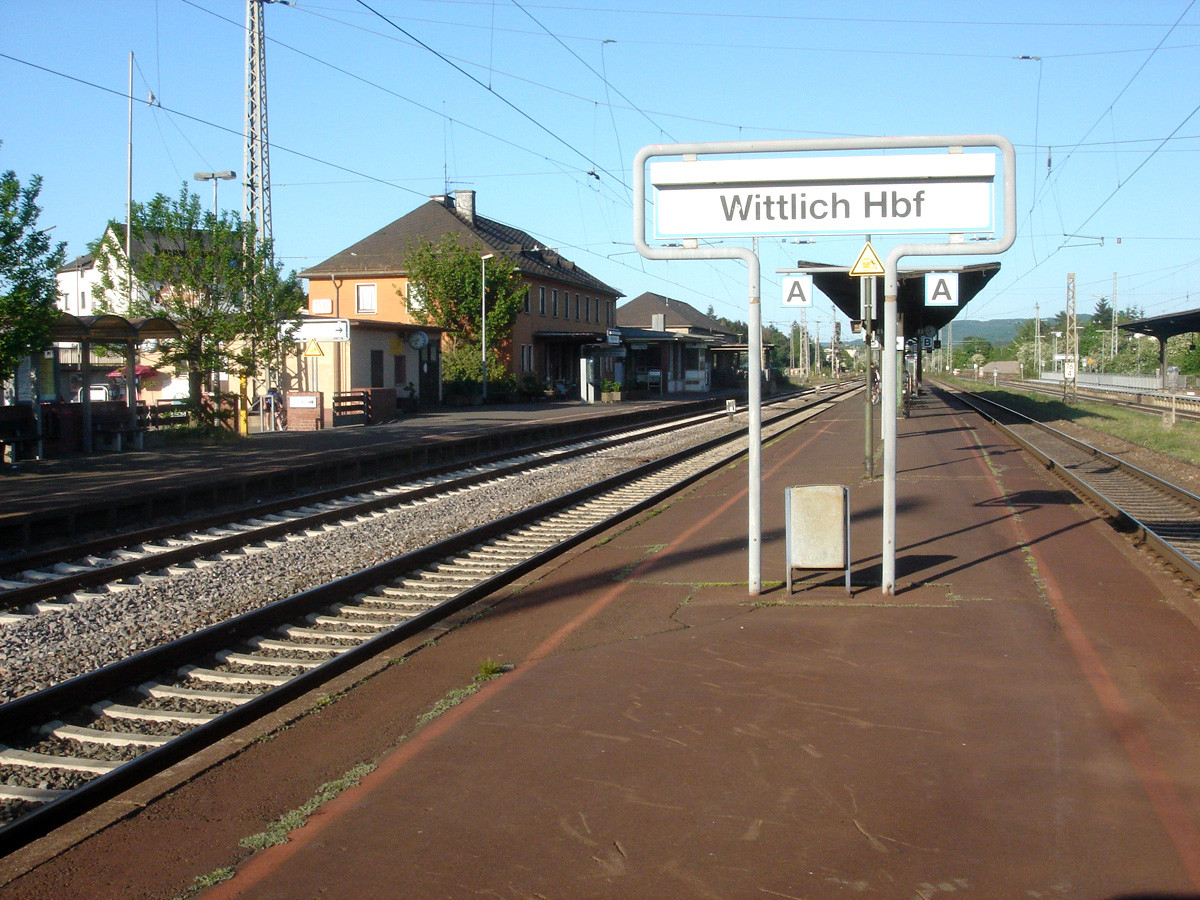
Main railway station

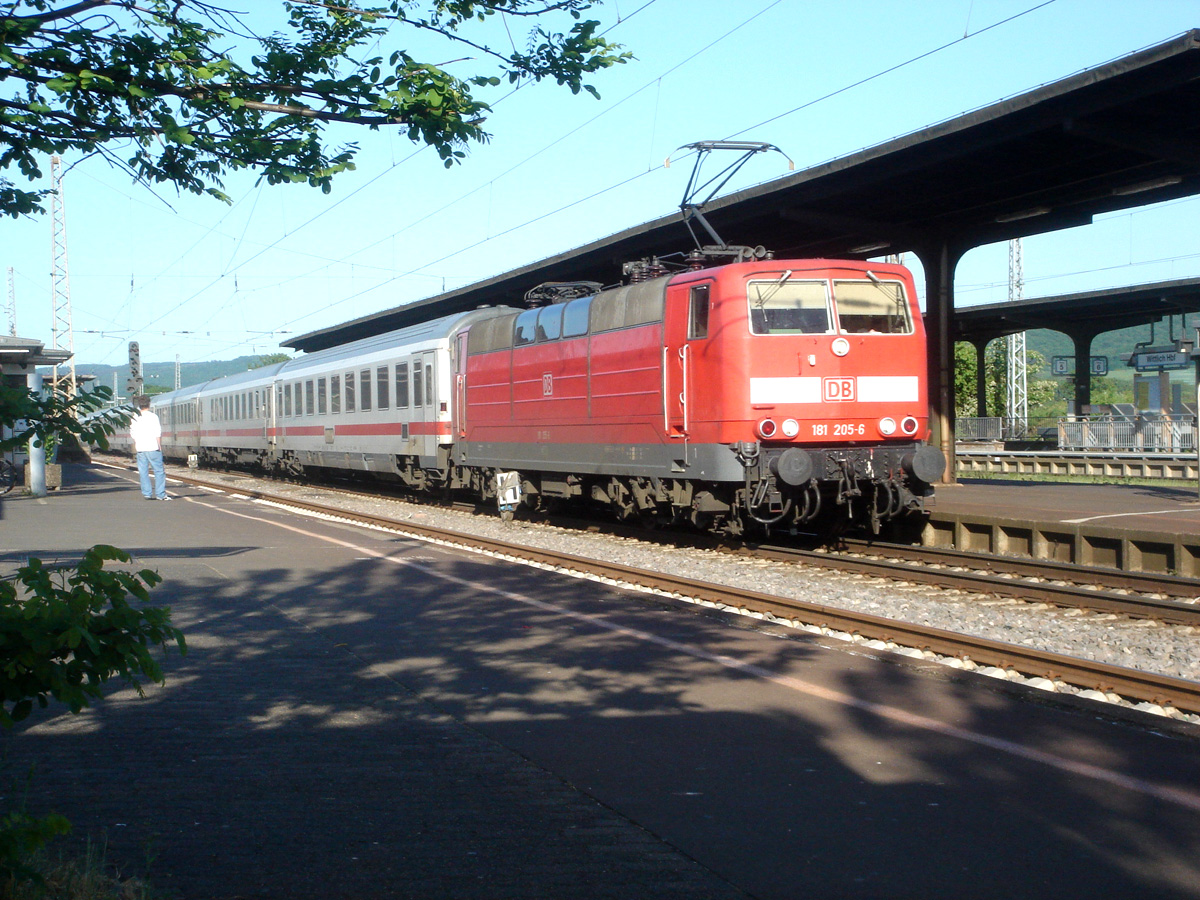
DB-InterCity at the station

Franklin Fueling Systems GmbH manages a major distribution warehouse supplying fueling and service station equipment to all of Europe, Middle East and Africa.

=== Transport ===
- Through the municipal area runs the Autobahn A 1 between Cologne and Saarbrücken.
- The Autobahn A 60, coming from Liège, thus far ends at the Wittlich Cross at the A 1.
- A new four-lane highway, the so-called B 50 neu, is currently being built. It will run from the Wittlich Autobahn Cross, where currently the A 60 ends, towards the Frankfurt Rhine Main Region and the Autobahn A 61. The first section, between Wittlich-Wengerohr and the Wittlich Autobahn Cross, will be completed in 2013, and the whole highway with its centrepiece, a long, high bridge over the Moselle (Hochmoselbrücke) is to be finished by 2016.
- Also crossing in Wittlich are Bundesstraßen 49 and 50.
- The railway station, Wittlich Hbf (Wengerohr station) with InterCityExpress connections lies in the outlying centre of Wengerohr on the Koblenz–Trier line. Regional services include the Mosel-Saar-Express from Koblenz by way of Trier to Saarbrücken, the Moseltal-Bahn from Koblenz by way of Wittlich to Trier and the Elbling Express from Wittlich by way of Trier to Perl. Long-distance services include ICE service between Luxembourg and Berlin and Intercityverkehr between Luxembourg and Emden. These trains all stop at Wittlich Hbf. The French railway operator SNCF is planning a long-distance service between Metz and Hamburg, which may stop at Wittlich.
- Right near the station, spurs once branched off the mainline to Daun by way of Wittlich-Stadt and Bernkastel-Kues, which have now been converted into cycle paths (the Maare-Mosel-Radweg). The transport link has been replaced by a bus route.
- The Maare-Mosel-Radweg (cycle path) is a tourist attraction that leads from Daun in the Vulkaneifel to the Moselle and Bernkastel-Kues. Bicycles can be transported on the cyclists’ bus from Bernkastel to Daun by way of Wittlich.
- The nearest airports are Luxembourg – Findel Airport and Frankfurt-Hahn Airport, each of which can be reached in about 40 minutes.

== Famous people ==
=== Honorary citizens ===
- Louis Constans Berger (1829–1891), industrialist and politician, honorary citizen since 1884
- Hans-Günther Heinz (1933–2024), entrepreneur and politician, honorary citizen since 2004
- Matthias Joseph Mehs (1893–1976), politician and local author, honorary citizen since 1966
- Willi Schrot (1915–2016) master locksmith, municipal politician, 1948–1979 Member of the district council, 1967–1979 Member of the Rhineland-Palatinate Landtag, honorary citizen since 2004

=== Sons and daughters of the town ===
- Max René Hesse (1877–1952), physician, writer, novelist
- Hans Friderichs (1931–2025), politician (FDP), Federal Minister for Economics (1972–1977)
- Tony Munzlinger (b. 1934), painter and cartoonist
- Hanin Elias (b. 1972), techno artist, founding member of Atari Teenage Riot
- Alfons Heck (1928–2005), internationally published author and lecturer. Winner of a Peabody Award. Appeared in several documentaries aired on HBO and the BBC. Wrote about his experiences as a German youth during World War II.
