= Church of St. Luzia =

Church in Eschfeld, Germany

Coordinates: 50°6′45.32″N 6°12′3.8″E

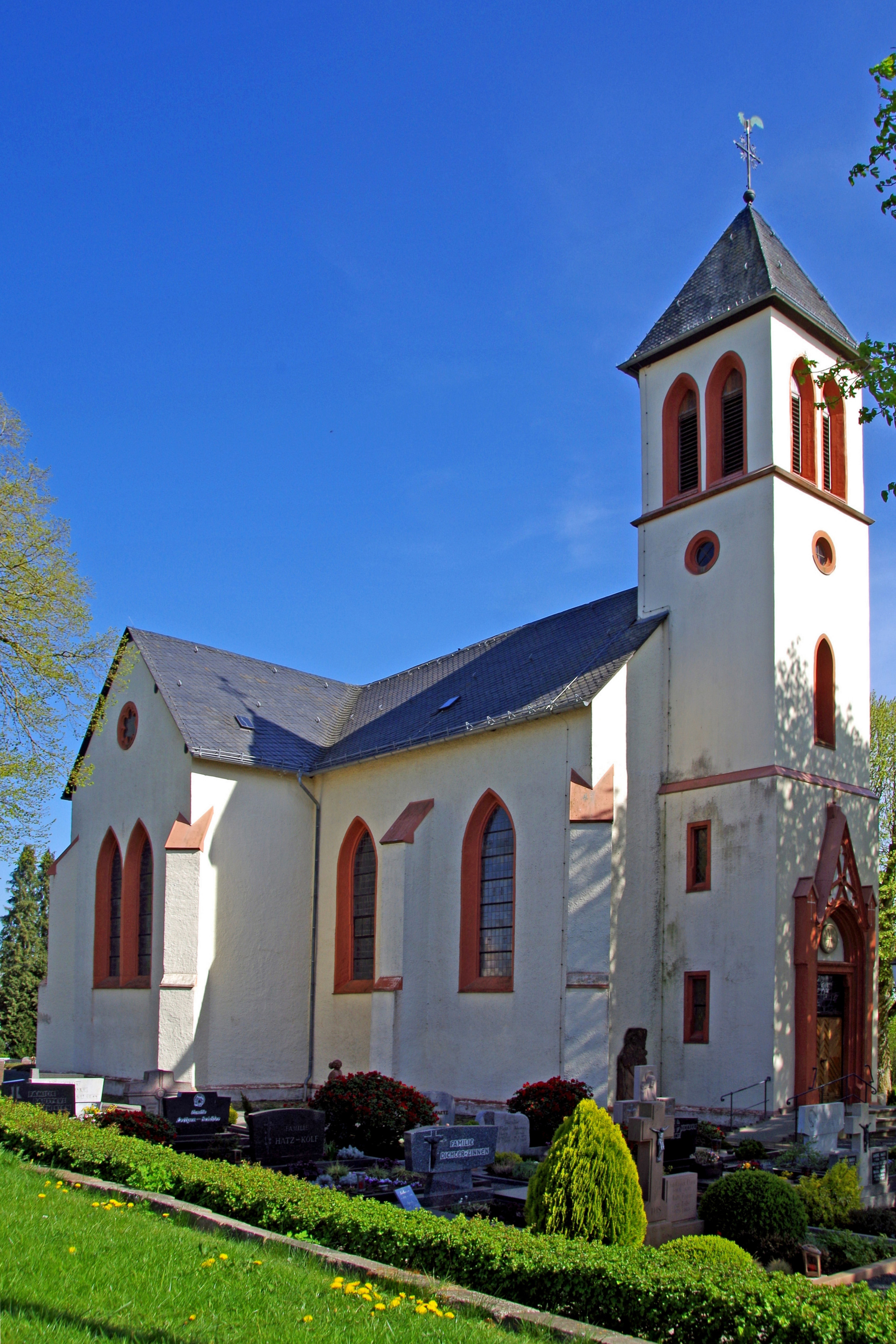
Eschfeld, St. Luzia

The Catholic parish church of St. Luzia in Eschfeld is located in the municipality of Arzfeld in the Rhineland-Palatinate Eifel district of Bitburg-Prüm in Germany.

== History ==
Eschfeld's first parish church stood in what is now the lower village, the old village centre, until 1867. The main patron saint of both the old and the new church is St Lucia. The simple neo-Gothic church in today's upper village was built in 1869/70 under Father Peter Lichter according to plans by the Trier architects Streit and Mendgen.

In 1921, Father Christoph März and his congregation celebrated the "Festival of the Last Brushstroke" to mark the completion of the church's colouring.

For the centenary celebrations in 1969/70, Father Josef Kasel had the war damage completely repaired.

== Architecture ==
The single-aisle nave leads into a transept, which is adjoined by the slightly lower choir with the three-sided apse. The resulting cruciform floor plan is spanned by ribbed vaults. The bell tower with its elaborate portal rises in front of the west façade. The corners of the church building have stepped buttresses. The façades are structured by round windows, lancet windows with pointed arches and acoustic hatches.

== Interior ==
The current high altar was acquired between 1969/1970, having previously stood in the parish church of St Laurentius in Bremm on the Moselle.

== Paintwork ==
From 1906 to 1921, Pastor Christoph März painted the church with motifs from the Old Testament and New Testament as well as from church history, consisting of over 1,000 figures and 150 animals, with his own hand. Residents modelled for some of the figures. The paintings each cover the maximum surface area of the respective components. The recurring use of intense blue and radiant gold as symbolic colours is striking. The images of all the popes and many churchmen were also immortalised on the walls. However, there is one thing the paintings do not show: a crucifixion motif. Instead, an oil painting from the Flemish Van Dyck school of painting hangs above the entrance to the sacristy. Father März bought the painting from his own funds. He obviously did not want to comment on it himself.

== Gallery ==
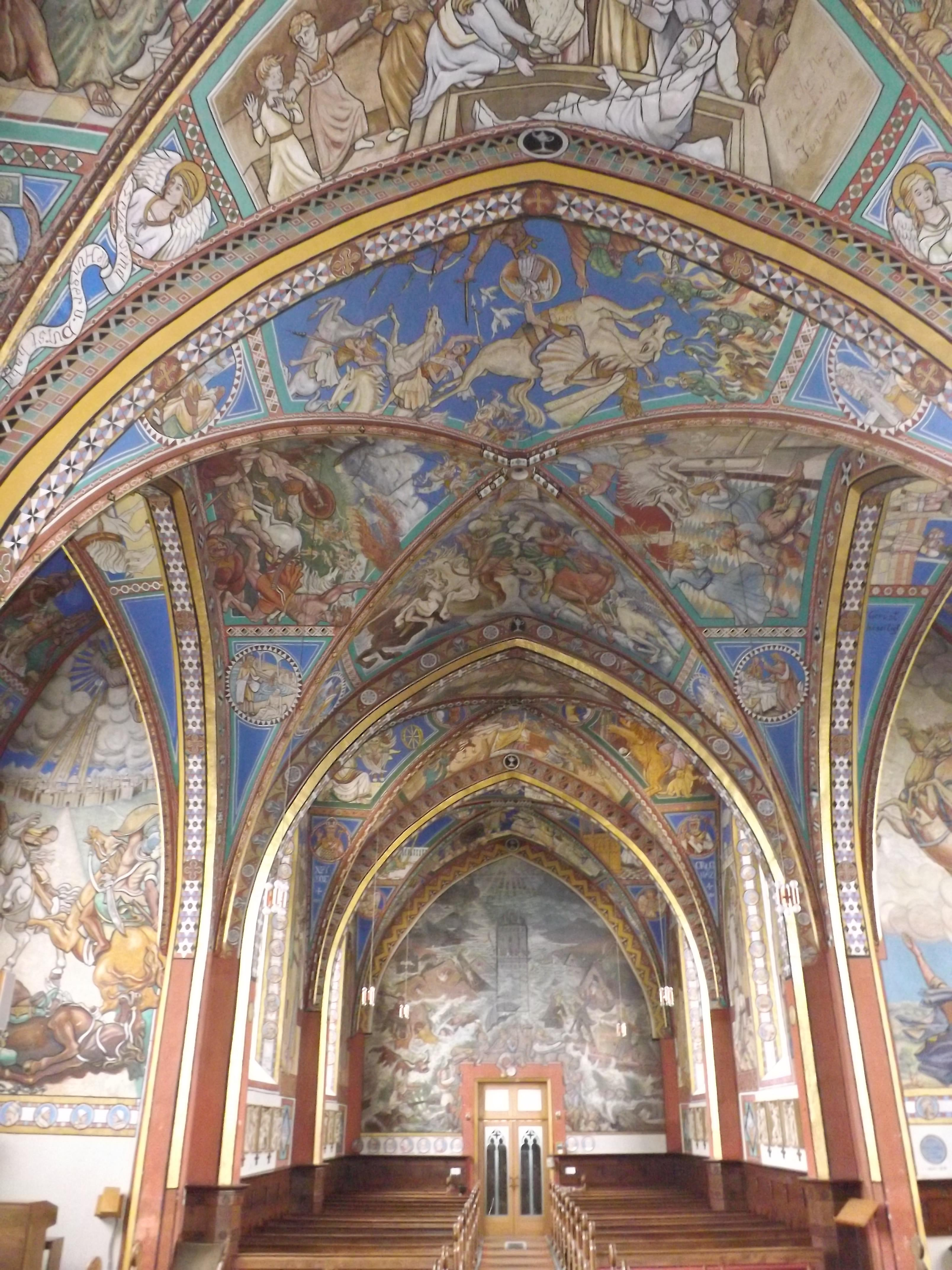
View of the church from the chancel

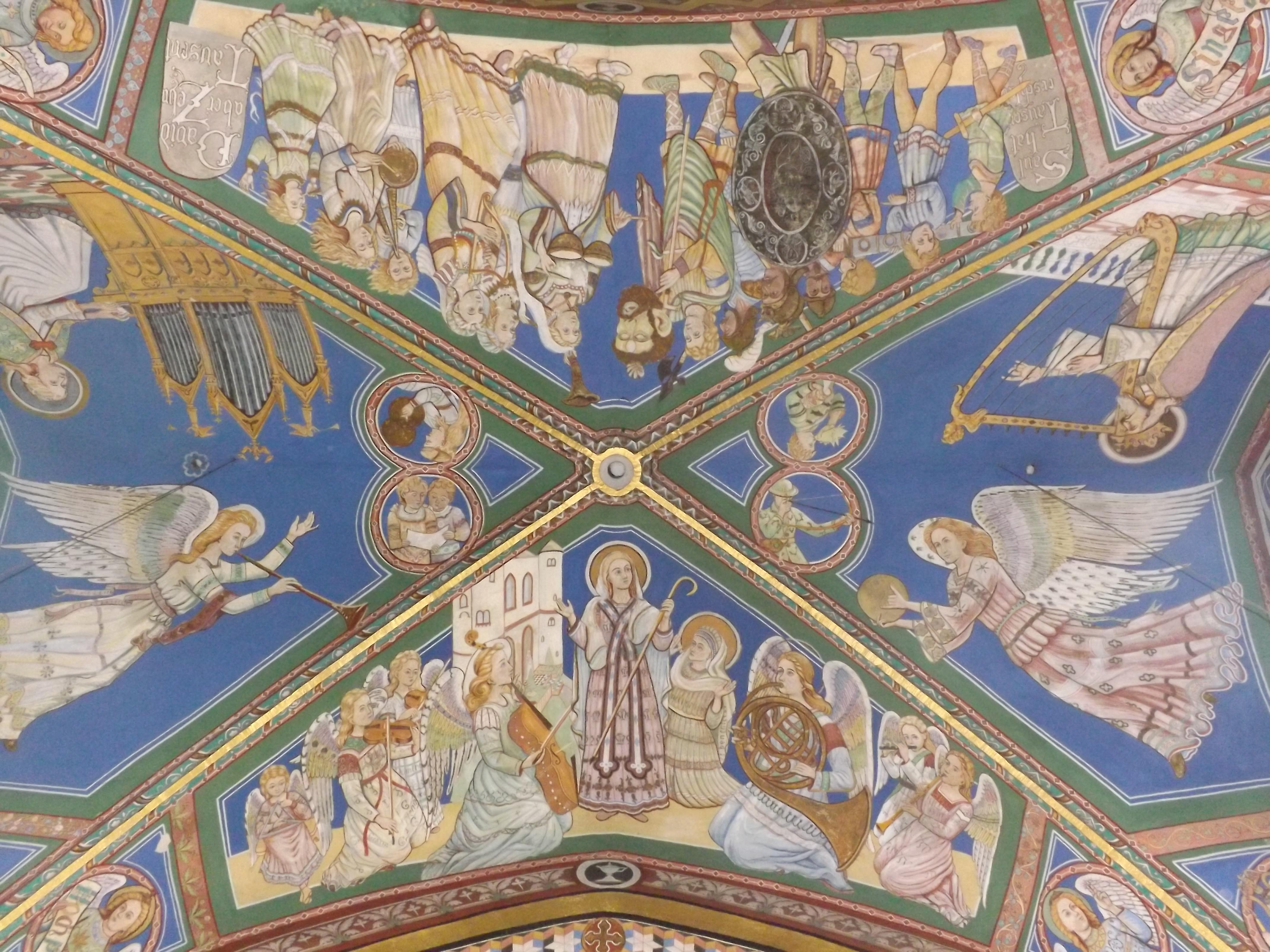
One of the ceiling paintings
