= Wittlich Synagogue =

Former synagogue in Wittlich, Germany

- German: Wittlich Synagoge
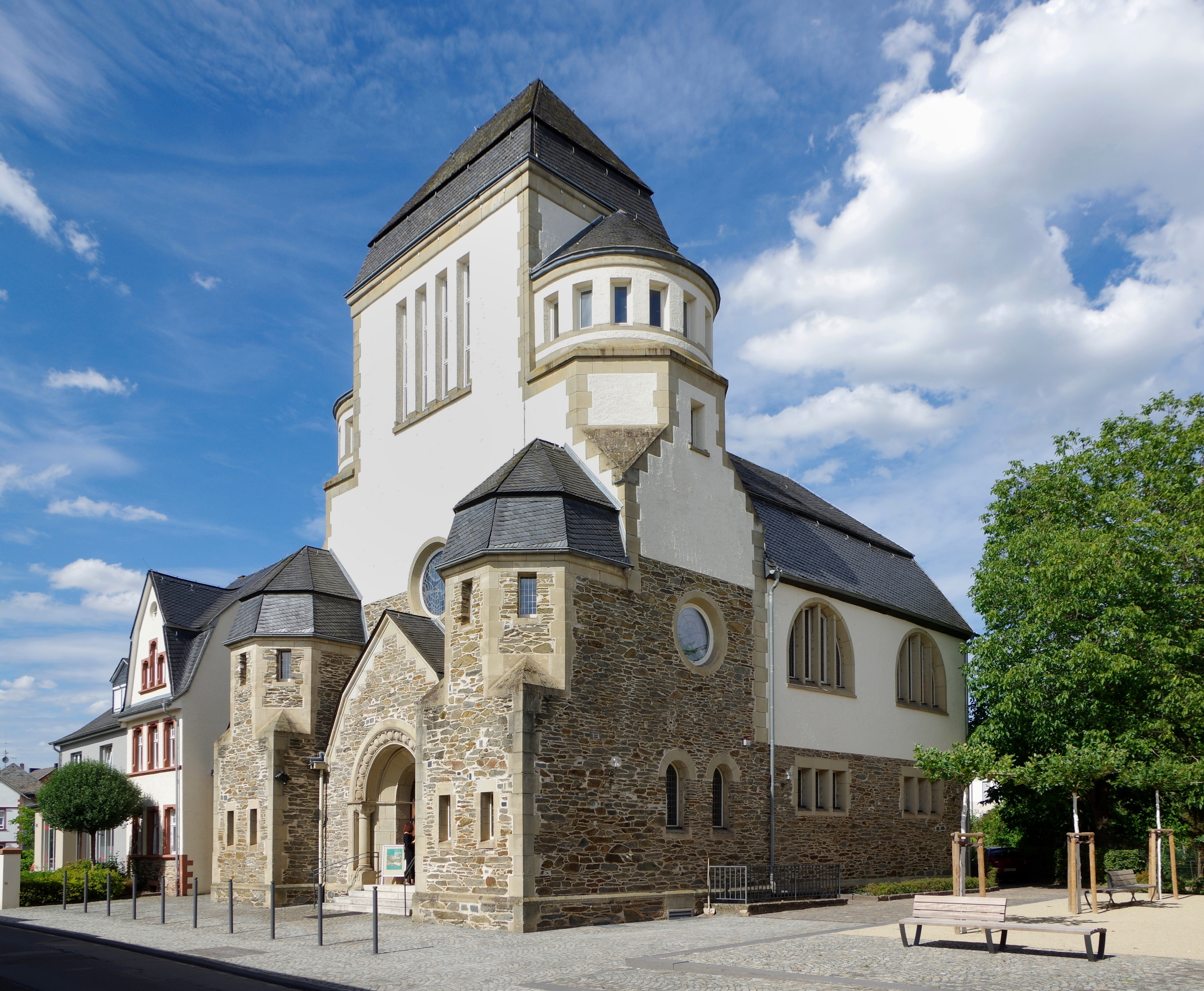
- The former synagogue, now cultural center building, in 2018

- Location of the former synagogue, now cultural center, in Rhineland-Palatinate

Religion
- Affiliation: Judaism (former)
- Rite: Nusach Ashkenaz
- Ecclesiastical or organizational status: Synagogue (1910–1938); Cultural center (since 1979)
- Status: Abandoned (as a synagogue); Repurposed

Location
- Location: 44 Himmeroder Straße, Wittlich, Rhineland-Palatinate
- Country: Germany
- Interactive map of Wittlich Synagogue
- Coordinates: 49°59′17″N 6°53′08″E

Architecture
- Architect: Johannes Vieknen
- Type: Synagogue architecture
- Style: Art Nouveau
- Groundbreaking: 1909
- Completed: 1910
- Materials: Stone

The Wittlich Synagogue (German: Wittlich Synagoge) is a former Jewish congregation and synagogue, located on Himmeroder Straße 44, in Wittlich, in the state of Rhineland-Palatinate, Germany. Designed by Johannes Vieknen in the Art Nouveau style and completed in 1910, the synagogue was the main place of worship for the city's Ashkenazi Jewish community until 1938.

The former synagogue building has been repurposed as a cultural center since 1979. The building functions as a cultural and conference center with a permanent exhibition on Jewish life in Wittlich.

== History ==
The Jewish community in Wittlich had previously used a smaller synagogue at Himmeroder Straße 8 that fell into disrepair. Subsequently, the current synagogue was erected on the same street according to the designs of architect Johannes Vieknen. The synagogue was consecrated in November 1910 by chief rabbi Jakob Baßfreund of Trier.

=== Under Nazi rule ===
During Kristallnacht in November 1938, the interior of the synagogue was destroyed by the Sturmabteilung and others. The city of Wittlich bought the building the following year and used it as a prisoner of war camp throughout World War II. Around 250 Jews were forced out of Wittlich, with the last deportation taking place in 1942. Ultimately, a third of the Jewish community of Wittlich was murdered in Nazi concentration camps. None of the survivors returned to Wittlich after the war, rendering the synagogue without a congregation.

== Architecture ==
The exterior of the synagogue remains largely unchanged from 1910. The interior comprised a prayer hall for men, a slim torah ark facing toward the east, and galleries for women on three sides. Typically for the period, the decor combined elements of German art nouveau with touches of neo-romanticism, as with the painted ornamentation surrounding the ark and the sanctuary lamp. This ornamentation was later restored from surviving drawings and the faded remains. The former torah ark was resurrected as a memorial in front of the building.

== Memorial ==
A commemorative plaque in the former torah ark contains inscriptions in Hebrew:

Remember, God, the souls of the righteous among the community of Wittlich, who sacrificed their lives for the holiness of God

and German:

The Wittlich Synagogue, erected in 1910, was the spiritual center of a thriving Jewish community. To the victims of Nazi persecution in Wittlich between 1933 and 1945, a memorial. To the living, a reminder.

== See also ==
- History of the Jews in Germany
- List of synagogues in Germany (in German)
