= Max René Hesse =

- Born: 17 July 1877; Wittlich, Rhine Province, Kingdom of Prussia, German Empire
- Died: 15 December 1952 (aged 75); Buenos Aires, Argentina
- Occupations: Physician, writer

Max René Hesse (17 July 1877 – 15 December 1952) was a German physician and writer. He was the author of more than ten novels, chiefly novels of development and social novels, characterized by a strong psychological element and an austere prose style that has often been associated with the New Objectivity. His style has sometimes been compared to that of Graham Greene.

== Biography ==
Hesse was born in Wittlich, then part of the Rhine Province and now in Rhineland-Palatinate, the son of Jakob Hesse, a Prussian inspector, and Anna Corneli (died 1907), who was of French descent on her mother's side. He studied medicine, law, and the humanities at the universities of Cologne and Berlin. He received his medical degree at Bonn in 1906 with a statistical dissertation on erysipelas.

From 1910 to 1927, Hesse practised medicine in Argentina. In 1928 he travelled through South America and Africa, where he engaged in big-game hunting. In 1929 he returned to Berlin, where he published his first novel and began working as a full-time writer. He remained in Berlin until 1933.

Between 1933 and 1942, Hesse lived variously in Vienna, the Balkans (particularly Croatia) and Italy. In 1933–1934, the Nazi regime initially attempted to appropriate his work and present him as a writer sympathetic to its ideological positions; his works were subsequently banned. There is no evidence that Hesse was ever a member of the Nazi Party (NSDAP).

In 1942 he briefly returned to Germany. In 1943 he moved to Madrid as a correspondent for the Kölnische Zeitung. Between 1943 and 1944 he stayed in Málaga, after which no further news of him was received, and in 1944 he was declared dead. In fact, he had returned to Argentina, where he spent the final years of his life in seclusion. He died in Buenos Aires on 15 December 1952.

== Partenau and its reception ==
Hesse's best-known and most discussed novel is Partenau (1929, Rütten & Loening), set among officers of the Reichswehr during the Weimar Republic. It depicts the homoerotic and comradely relationship between Oberleutnant Partenau—a military strategist, uncompromising patriot, and homosexual—and the young Oberfähnrich Kiebold. The two spend their evenings devising strategic plans to overturn the Treaty of Versailles, reconquer Poland, and expand eastwards.

The novel achieved considerable success and was translated into French as early as 1930 by Albin Michel.

Ernst Jünger reviewed the novel favourably in the July 1929 issue of Widerstand. Zeitschrift für nationalrevolutionäre Politik (vol. 4, no. 7, pp. 203–204), praising its soldierly spirit, anti-bourgeois outlook, and "masculine power".

Victor Klemperer devoted an entire chapter of his LTI – Lingua Tertii Imperii (1947) to Partenau, describing it as an anticipation of the language and mentality of the Third Reich. According to Klemperer, the novel already embodied the spirit of the disillusioned German Landsknecht, together with ambition, contempt for bourgeois morality, and the cult of the military leader.

== Other works ==
Following Partenau, Hesse published the novels Morath schlägt sich durch (1932) and Morath verwirklicht einen Traum (1933), both set in the world of business and concerned with the struggle for existence. These were followed by Der unzulängliche Idealist (1935) and the Dietrich Kattenburg trilogy—Dietrich und der Herr der Welt (1937), Jugend ohne Stern (1943), and Überreife Zeit (1950)—a Bildungsroman set in the Rhineland. His last novel published during his lifetime was Liebe und Lüge (1950). Die Erbschaft was published posthumously in 1984.

Hesse also left three unpublished novels and several plays.

== Obituary and posthumous reception ==
Following Hesse's death, Frank Thiess published an obituary entitled "Max René Hesse gestorben" in Neue Literarische Welt (vol. 3, no. 24, 1952, p. 4). Thiess emphasized Hesse's literary and personal qualities, while noting that the writer had by then been largely forgotten.

== Selected works ==
- 1929 – Partenau, Rütten & Loening, Frankfurt am Main (French translation, 1930)
- 1932 – Morath schlägt sich durch, Cassirer, Berlin (French translation, 1934)
- 1933 – Morath verwirklicht einen Traum, Cassirer, Berlin (French translation, 1935)
- 1935 – Der unzulängliche Idealist, Cassirer, Berlin
- 1937 – Dietrich und der Herr der Welt, Krüger, Berlin
- 1943 – Jugend ohne Stern, Krüger, Berlin
- 1950 – Überreife Zeit, Krüger, Berlin (concluding volume of the Dietrich Kattenburg trilogy)
- 1950 – Liebe und Lüge, Artemis, Zürich
- 1984 – Die Erbschaft. Ein Nachkriegsroman in sieben Büchern, Gantner & Cramer, Vaduz (posthumous)
