= Sankt Aldegund =

- Municipality
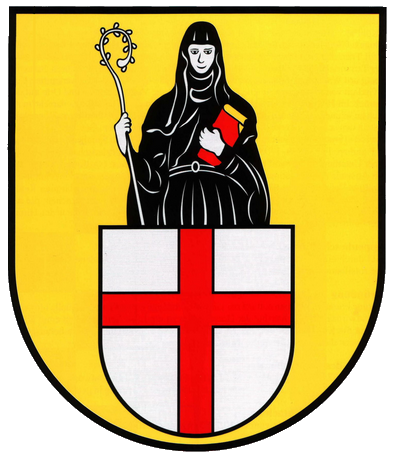
- Coat of arms

- Location of Sankt Aldegund within Cochem-Zell district
- Interactive map of Sankt Aldegund
- Location within Germany Location within Rhineland-Palatinate
- Coordinates: 50°4′55″N 7°7′45″E
- Country: Germany
- State: Rhineland-Palatinate
- District: Cochem-Zell
- Municipal assoc.: Zell (Mosel)

Government
  - Mayor (2019–24): Günter Treis

Area
  - Total: 6.16 km^{2} (2.38 sq mi)
- Elevation: 100 m (330 ft)

Population (2025-12-31)
  - Total: 494
  - Density: 80.2/km^{2} (208/sq mi)
- Time zone: UTC+01:00 (CET)
  - Summer (DST): UTC+02:00 (CEST)
- Postal codes: 56858
- Dialling codes: 06542
- Vehicle registration: COC
- Website: www.st-aldegund.de

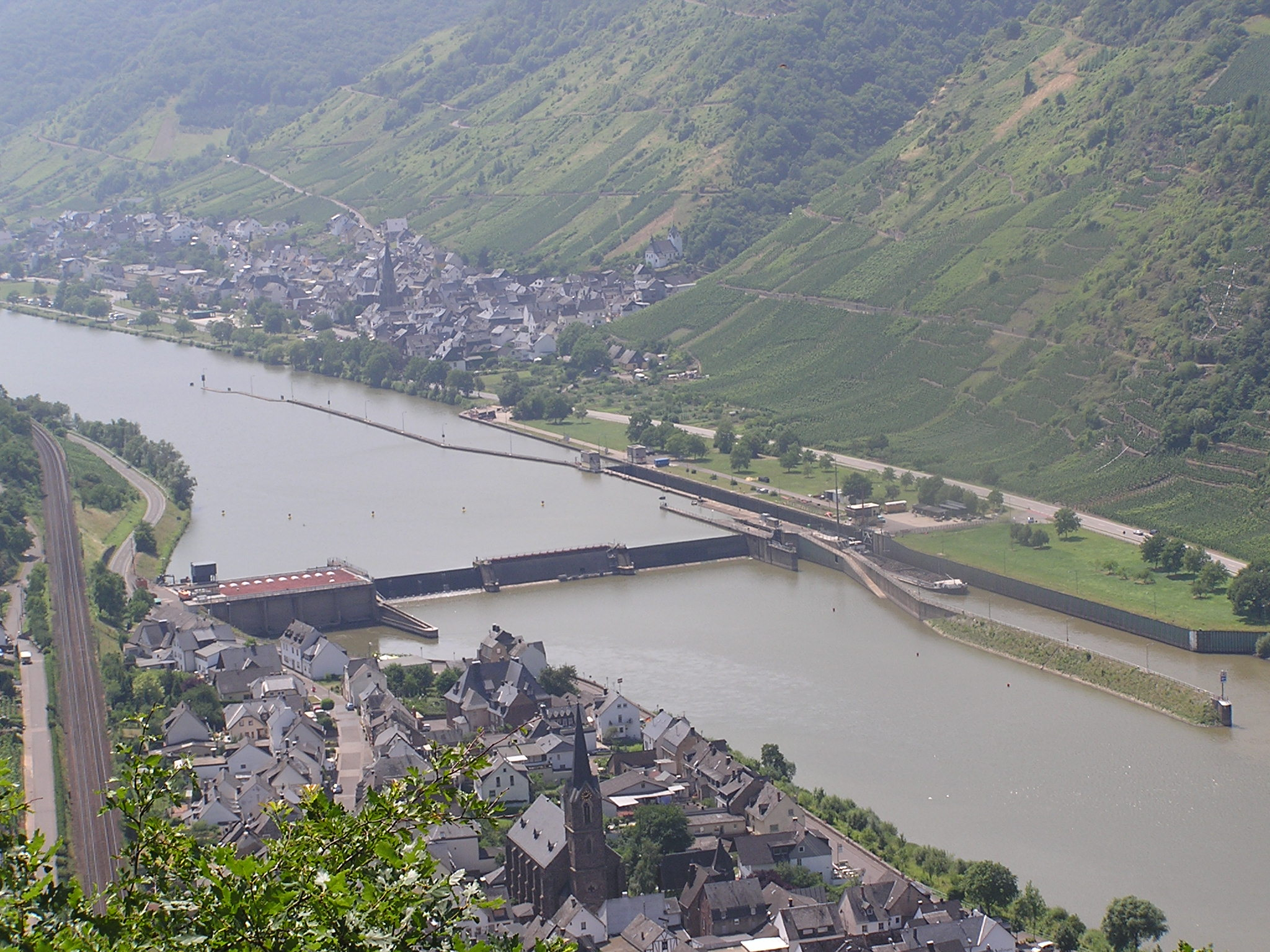
Neef and Sankt Aldegund (background) with a weir and a lock on the Moselle

Sankt Aldegund is an Ortsgemeinde – a municipality belonging to a Verbandsgemeinde, a kind of collective municipality – in the Cochem-Zell district in Rhineland-Palatinate, Germany. It belongs to the Verbandsgemeinde of Zell, whose seat is in the municipality of Zell an der Mosel. Sankt Aldegund is a winegrowing and holidaymaking centre.

== Geography ==
The municipality lies on the river Moselle roughly halfway between Trier and Koblenz.

== History ==
In 1097, Sankt Aldegund had its first documentary mention as Sanctam Aldegundam. It is known that the place was settled as far back as Roman times from the foundations of a Roman villa rustica south of the village, and also from a woman's grave from Constantine the Great’s time (Emperor from AD 306 to 337, in early Christian times) unearthed in 1953 during vineyard work. The grave also yielded up valuable grave goods made of glass and ceramic, among them a blue glass bowl shaped like a little ship, whose fine execution had never before been seen in a find north of the Alps.

The municipality’s namesake is the Merovingian prince’s daughter and abbess Aldegonde (or Aldegundis), who in the 7th century lived and worked in Maubeuge, and who was canonized shortly after dying of breast cancer.

The old village school, mentioned in 1523, was used as a one-room school until 1781.

Beginning in 1794, Sankt Aldegund lay under French rule. In 1815 it was assigned to the Kingdom of Prussia at the Congress of Vienna. Since 1946, it has been part of the then newly founded state of Rhineland-Palatinate. Under the Verwaltungsvereinfachungsgesetz (“Administration Simplification Law”) of 18 July 1970, with effect from 7 November 1970, the municipality was grouped into the Verbandsgemeinde of Zell.

== Politics ==
=== Municipal council ===
The council is made up of 12 council members, who were elected by majority vote at the municipal election held on 7 June 2009, and the honorary mayor as chairman.

=== Mayor ===
Sankt Aldegund's mayor is Günter Treis.

=== Coat of arms ===
The municipality's arms might be described thus: Or in base an inescutcheon argent charged with a cross gules, behind which standing Saint Aldegonde vested sable, in her dexter hand an abbess's staff, in her sinister hand a book of the third garnished of the first.

== Culture and sightseeing ==
=== Buildings ===
The following are listed buildings or sites in Rhineland-Palatinate’s Directory of Cultural Monuments:

- Saint Bartholomew’s Old Catholic Parish Church (Alte Pfarrkirche St. Bartholomäus), Alte Kirchgasse 6a – west tower with Late Romanesque roof with four faces each of which is diamond-shaped, tower top and dormers Late Gothic; triaxial nave, essentially Gothic, conversion in the 18th century (1762/1763?); graveyard: eight grave crosses, 1728, 1766, 1783, 1811; grave cross with relief, 18th century; underneath the church a spring; whole complex with old graveyard (see also below)
- Saint Aldegonde’s and Saint Bartholomew’s New Catholic Parish Church (Neue Pfarrkirche St. Aldegundis und Bartholomäus), Römerstraße 2 – Gothic Revival aisleless church with transept, slate quarrystone, 1864–1875; before the church a warriors’ memorial, semicircular layout with pylon
- Village centre (Alte Kirchgasse 1/corner of Auf der Teusch, Alte Kirchgasse 2, 3, 5–9, old parish church, Auf der Teusch 1, 3, 8–10, 13, Brunnenstraße 1, 2, 4, 9, 10, 12–14, 16, Christophorusstraße 1–3, 6–14, Kapellenstraße 1–4, 6, 7/Zehnthausstraße 1, Kapellenstraße 8, 9 and beside no. 9, 10, 12, Moseluferstraße, Römerstraße 7–10, Zehnthausstraße 2, 4, 6) (monumental zone) – village centre around Alte Kirchgasse (“Old Church Lane”) with timber-frame houses from the 16th to 19th century, a few brick and plastered buildings from the 18th to early 20th century including the Old Town Hall (Altes Rathaus) and the old mediaeval parish church converted in the 18th century with the old graveyard
- Alte Kirchgasse – wayside cross, marked 1656
- Alte Kirchgasse 2 – timber-frame house, partly solid, plastered, 16th century; second half of house: three-floor timber-frame house, partly solid, marked 1619
- Alte Kirchgasse 5 – former school (?); one-floor plastered building, apparently about 1500, mentioned in 1769
- Alte Kirchgasse 7 – timber-frame house, partly solid or slated, 16th century; whole complex
- Am Moselstausee 6 – timber-frame house, partly solid, balloon frame, possibly from the 16th century
- Am Moselstausee 9 – Late Historicist brick building, Renaissance Revival motifs, marked 1896
- Am Moselstausee 12 – Baroque portal, marked 1782
- Am Moselstausee 13/14 – plastered building
- Beside Am Moselstausee 14 – wine cellar; angled, quarrystone, marked 1892
- Am Moselstausee 20 – building with hipped roof, 1920s
- Am Moselstausee 30 – Art Nouveau portal
- Auf der Teusch 1 – timber-frame house, partly solid, mansard roof, 18th century
- Auf der Teusch 9 – three-floor timber-frame house, partly solid, plastered and roofed with Eternit, early 17th century
- Auf der Teusch 10 – timber-frame house, partly solid, balloon frame, marked 1590; timber-frame barn, mansard roof, 18th century; whole complex
- At Brunnenstraße 9 – one-floor plastered building
- Brunnenstraße 10 – timber-frame house on high basement, earlier half of the 16th century, timber-frame bridge
- Brunnenstraße 12 – timber-frame house, partly solid or plastered, marked 1659
- Brunnenstraße 16 – timber-frame house, partly solid, half-hipped roof, marked 1618
- Before Christophorusstraße 2 – two fountain basins, marked 1790
- Christophorusstraße 2 – former town hall; three-floor timber-frame house, partly solid, apparently from 1848, likelier from late 19th century
- Christophorusstraße 6 – building with mansard roof, 18th century
- Christophorusstraße 7 – timber-frame house, partly solid, marked 1619
- Christophorusstraße 8 – timber-frame house, partly solid, half-hipped roof, early 17th century
- Christophorusstraße 9 – timber-frame house, partly solid, half-hipped roof, marked 1619
- Christophorusstraße 10 – Christophorushaus; timber-frame house, partly solid, mansard roof, marked 1473, coat of arms marked 1765; three-floor side building with timber-frame oriel, figure of Saint Christopher, sculpted windowledge fields, marked 1710
- Christophorusstraße 11 – timber-frame house, partly solid, mansard roof, marked 1752
- Christophorusstraße 12 – timber-frame house, partly solid, plastered, essentially possibly from the mid 17th century
- Christophorusstraße 13 – timber-frame house, partly solid, marked 1606
- Christophorusstraße 14 – three-floor timber-frame house, partly solid, 18th century, timber-frame oriel possibly from the 20th century; addition, 19th century
- Kapellenstraße 3 – timber-frame house on stone pedestal, essentially possibly from the 16th century
- Kapellenstraße 6 – timber-frame house, partly solid or plastered, marked 1827 (possibly a conversion), essentially possibly from the 18th century
- Kapellenstraße 7 – tithe house of Springiersbach Monastery; Baroque building with hipped mansard roof on high basement, marked 1780; whole complex with winepress house and garden
- Kapellenstraße 10 – former threshing house; plastered building, mid 18th century
- Klosterkammer Straße – chapel; open quarrystone building, marked 1599, walls renovated in 1959; Mother of God on the cloud band, 19th century
- Klosterkammerstraße 6 – former library (?); plastered building, marked 1898
- Klosterkammerstraße/corner of Römerstraße – pietà, 18th century
- Römerstraße 8 – timber-frame house, partly solid, marked 1663
- Römerstraße 9 – quarrystone building, mansard roof, Moselle local style, 1908
- Römerstraße 10 – timber-frame house, partly solid, balloon frame, 16th century
- Zehnthausstraße 1 – (see Kapellenstraße 7)
- Zehnthausstraße 6 – timber-frame house, partly solid, mansard roof, marked 1774
- Chapel, plastered building, pyramidal roof, 18th century; Saint Sebastian, 19th or 20th century

=== Old church ===
First mentioned in 1144 was the Romanesque “Old Church”, standing over the village, for centuries a pilgrimage centre for the local farmers to the “livestock saint”, Bartholomew the Apostle, who was also the church's patron. Among the valuable appointments are a Renaissance altar from Hans Ruprecht Hoffmann's workshop, a “Christ at Rest” from 1522, a gift from Abbot Nikolaus of Sankt Aldegund, who worked at a monastery in Lorraine, a wrought-iron pulpit (about 1650) and a Late Gothic Madonna. The apse and the church's interior are decorated with Late Gothic paintings. Buried in the surrounding churchyard is the art collector Peter Ludwig, who died in 1996. The “New Parish Church” in Gothic Revival style was completed in 1872 and is decorated with interesting painted artwork from 1912, restored in 2005.

== Sundry ==
Near Sankt Aldegund stands a transmission facility of the Amt für Geoinformationswesen der Bundeswehr (“Bureau for Earth Science Information of the Bundeswehr”).
