= Bremm =

- Municipality
- Coat of arms

- Location of Bremm within Cochem-Zell district
- Interactive map of Bremm
- Location within Germany Location within Rhineland-Palatinate
- Coordinates: 50°6′5″N 7°7′4″E
- Country: Germany
- State: Rhineland-Palatinate
- District: Cochem-Zell
- Municipal assoc.: Cochem

Government
  - Mayor (2021–24): Hermann Oster

Area
  - Total: 9.14 km^{2} (3.53 sq mi)
- Elevation: 100 m (330 ft)

Population (2025-12-31)
  - Total: 687
  - Density: 75.2/km^{2} (195/sq mi)
- Time zone: UTC+01:00 (CET)
  - Summer (DST): UTC+02:00 (CEST)
- Postal codes: 56814
- Dialling codes: 02675
- Vehicle registration: COC
- Website: www.bremm-mosel.de

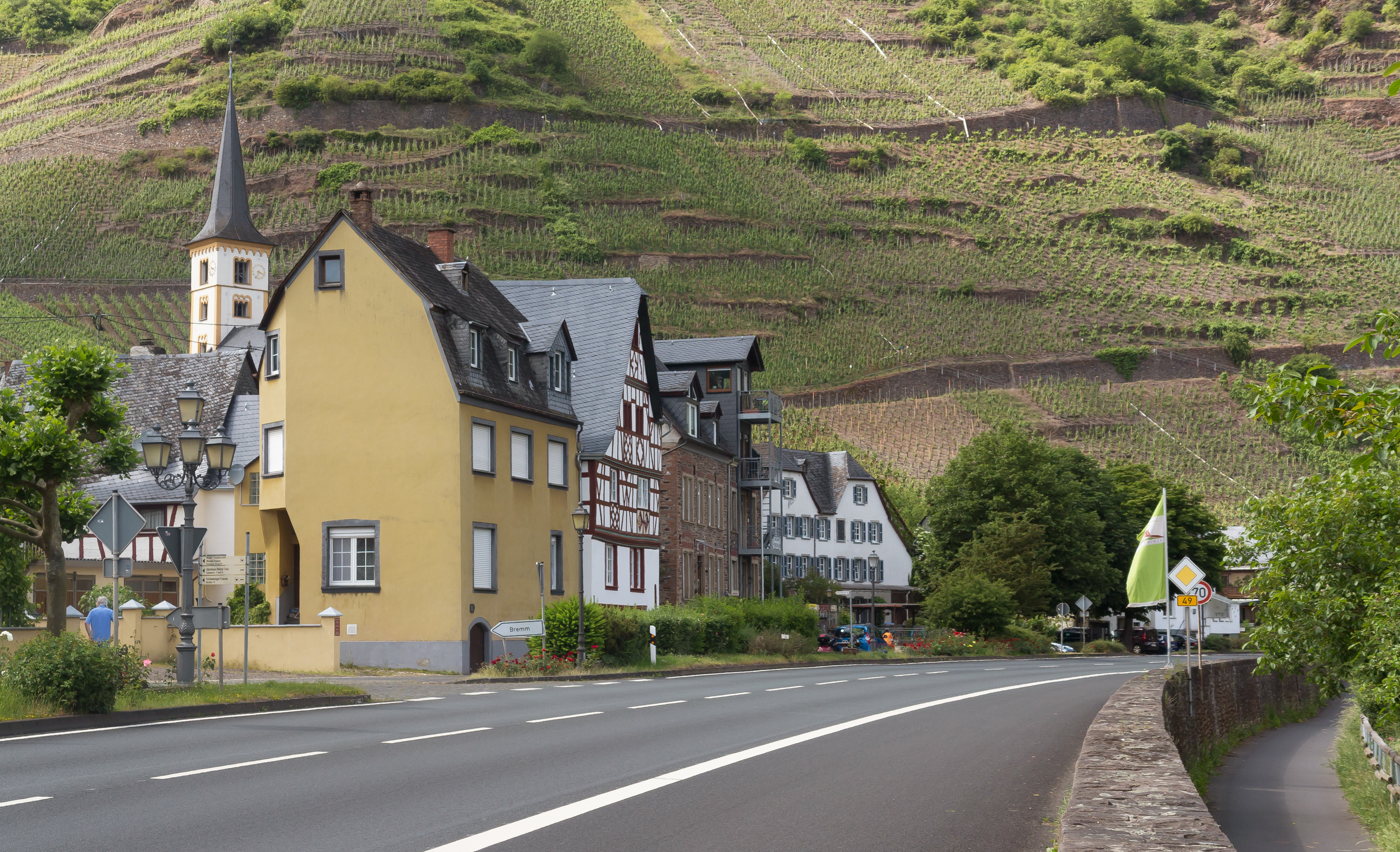
Bremm, view of the village from the main street

Bremm (German pronunciation: [bʁɛm]) is an Ortsgemeinde – a municipality belonging to a Verbandsgemeinde, a kind of collective municipality – in the Cochem-Zell district in Rhineland-Palatinate, Germany. It belongs to the Verbandsgemeinde of Cochem, whose seat is in the like-named town.

== Geography ==
The municipality lies at a bow in the river Moselle between Trier and Koblenz, among the sloped vineyards of the Calmont, which with an elevation of 380 m above sea level and a slope of roughly 65° is Europe’s steepest vineyard location. This stretches along the Moselle from Ediger-Eller to Bremm, and is part of the Mosel wine region.

== History ==
In 1051, Bremm had its first documentary mention as Brembe.

Nevertheless, Bremm would seem to be considerably older. Many finds at the south slope lying south of Bremm have led to the conclusion that the place was settled as early as Roman times. Possibly in the early centuries of the Christian era, either a small settlement or a great homestead lay there.

While cultivating the land in the 1950s, winegrowers reported problems that arose during ploughing due to foundation walls in the ground. Fragments of typically Roman building materials at this time lent further weight to the supposition of Bremm’s Roman origin.

In the Middle Ages, Bremm’s most important landholder was until 1802 the Stuben Augustinian Convent. The first church was mentioned in 1097. The one that stands now was built in the late 15th century; in 1895 it was remodelled and enlarged. Like all the municipality’s foregoing churches, it is consecrated to Saint Lawrence. The lovely Baroque altar from 1630 was sold to Schloss Gondorf at the time of the remodelling, but in 1968 it was bought back for DM 30,000.

Beginning in 1794, Bremm lay under French rule. In 1815, it was assigned to the Kingdom of Prussia at the Congress of Vienna. Since 1946, it has been part of the then newly founded state of Rhineland-Palatinate.

In 2002, Bremm was awarded the title “Loveliest Village in Rhineland-Palatinate” in the contest Unser Dorf hat Zukunft (“Our Village Has a Future”).

== Politics ==
=== Municipal council ===
The council is made up of 12 council members, who were elected by proportional representation at the municipal election held on 7 June 2009, and the honorary mayor as chairwoman. The 12 seats are shared between two voters’ groups. In the earlier election in 2004, council members were elected by majority vote.

=== Mayor ===
Bremm's mayor is Hermann Oster.

=== Coat of arms ===
The German blazon reads: Durch aufsteigende, eingebogene grüne Spitze, darin eine goldene Traube, gespalten; vorne in Schwarz drei goldene Spitzbogenfenster, darunter goldener Wellenbalken; hinten in Silber rotes griechisches Doppelkreuz.

The municipality's arms might in English heraldic language be described thus: Tierced in mantle, dexter sable three ogival windows in fess under which a fess wavy Or, sinister argent a cross patriarchal gules, in base vert a bunch of grapes slipped of the second.

The charge on the dexter (armsbearer's right, viewer's left) side refers to the picturesque ruin across the Moselle from the village, on the right bank. It is what is left of the Stuben Augustinian Convent.

The double cross (Patriarchal cross) on the sinister (armsbearer's left, viewer's right) side was the convent's hallmark and was drawn from a well known cross reliquary whose chest from Constantinople today belongs to the Limburg Cathedral Treasury. From 1208, the reliquary, whose golden setting for the cross particles are set in the shape of a Patriarchal cross, was in the convent's ownership. Boundary stones marking the convent's former vineyards, landholdings and woodlands still bear this symbol. Remnants of an old winepress and one house door in Bremm also bear the Patriarchal cross.

The bunch of grapes, of course, refers to the municipality's main economic structure, which is winegrowing.

The arms were designed by Decku in Sankt Wendel (Saarland). The arms have been borne since 11 January 1968.

== Culture and sightseeing ==
=== Buildings ===
In Saint Lawrence's Church is a Baroque altar. A ruin is all that is left of the Stuben Augustinian Convent. There are in Bremm several timber-frame houses, among them the Storchenhaus (“Stork House”) with woodcarving.

The following are listed buildings or sites in Rhineland-Palatinate’s Directory of Cultural Monuments:

- Saint Lawrence's Catholic Church (Kirche St. Laurentius), Brunnenstraße – Romanesque west tower, upper floor and cupola from 1841; two-naved hall church, late 15th century, lengthening 1895; whole complex with the walled graveyard, wherein a grave cross, 18th century, Baroque cross.
- Am Storchenhaus 1 – Storchenhaus; three-floor richly decorated timber-frame house, partly solid, jutting upper floor, bears yeardates 1695 and 1696; timber-frame wing, partly solid, from 1670.
- Am Storchenhaus 3 – timber-frame house, partly solid, from 1740 and also timber-frame house, partly solid, 18th or 19th century.
- Am Storchenhaus 10 – timber-frame house, partly solid, about 1900.
- Am Storchenhaus 11 – timber-frame house, partly solid, plastered, half-hipped roof, 17th century.
- Am Storchenhaus 13 – timber-frame house, partly solid, late 19th century, raised with a knee wall; quarrystone winepress house.
- Brunnenstraße – basalt fountain from 1813, converted 1913.
- Brunnenstraße 6 – timber-frame house, partly solid, balloon frame, half-hipped roof, from 1552; before it a quarrystone house with vaulted cellar, 1400 (?).
- Brunnenstraße 11 – timber-frame house, partly solid, mansard roof, 18th century; abutting it a timber-frame house, partly solid, 19th century; two hearth heating plates.
- Brunnenstraße 39 – timber-frame house, partly solid, from 1810.
- Calmontstraße 8/10 – building with mansard roof, partly timber-frame, from 1824.
- Gartenstraße 2 – timber-frame house, partly solid, plastered, 18th or 19th century.
- Kirchstraße 1 – timber-frame house, partly solid, balloon frame, 16th century.
- Kirchstraße 3 – timber-frame house, partly solid or plastered, mansard roof, 18th century.
- Kirchstraße 8 – three-floor timber-frame house, partly solid, plastered and slated, half-hipped roof, essentially from the 16th century, remodelled in the 17th century.
- Kirchstraße 21 – timber-frame house, partly solid, early 18th century.
- Moselstraße 26 a, b, c – three houses; no. 26a quarrystone building with Renaissance Revival gable, about 1900, ballroom; no. 26b Baroque building with mansard roof, 18th century; no. 26c three-floor plastered building, partly timber-frame, bears yeardates 1626 and 1747.
- Moselstraße 27 – residential and commercial house; quarrystone building, from 1624.
- Moselstraße 40 – quarrystone building, from 1847.
- Moselstraße 47 – wayside cross, from 1707.
- Moselstraße 48 – quarrystone house, “Moselle-style” (Moselstil), about 1900.
- Turmstraße 2 – timber-frame house, partly solid, 18th century; quarrystone barn, partly timber-frame.
- Turmstraße 5, Zehnthausstraße 8 – former tithe house; three-floor quarrystone building, essentially possibly from the 15th century.
- On Bundesstraße 49 going towards Sankt Aldegund – Michaelskapelle (chapel); open quarrystone building with Baroque grille.
- Kloster-Stuben-Straße – ruin of Stuben Convent; one-naved convent church.
- Way of the Cross with Chapel of the cross, possibly from the 19th century; Way of the Cross, quarrystone, Bildstock type, 20th century.
- northeast of Bremm – vineyard terraces.

=== Winegrowing ===
As early as 2,000 years ago, the Romans, having recognized the advantages of the slaty soil on the steep slopes facing the sun, planted here in the Bremmer Calmont the first grapevines. They called the hill calidus mons – the hot hill – for it is a south-facing slope with extremely favourable climatic conditions. The Romans’ name also yields the modern name, “Calmont”. The slopes, set at between 50 and 55°, are Europe's steepest vineyard terraces. Grown here are most outstanding Riesling wines, which at both state and federal levels achieve high awards.

The greatest part of the vineyards and lands formerly belonged to the Stuben Augustinian Convent. Winegrowing has been throughout time an important economic activity and still is among the now 970 inhabitants. A considerable rôle is played by the marketing of bottled Qualitätswein and Prädikatswein. The roughly 100 ha of vineyards within Bremm's municipal area is shared among five individual vineyard operators – Einzellagen – since the reapportionment: Calmont, Abtei Kloster Stuben, Frauenberg, Schlemmertröpfchen and Laurentiusberg.

=== Outdoor activities ===
For a few years now, the via ferrata through the Bremmer Calmont each year draws many visitors to the municipality.

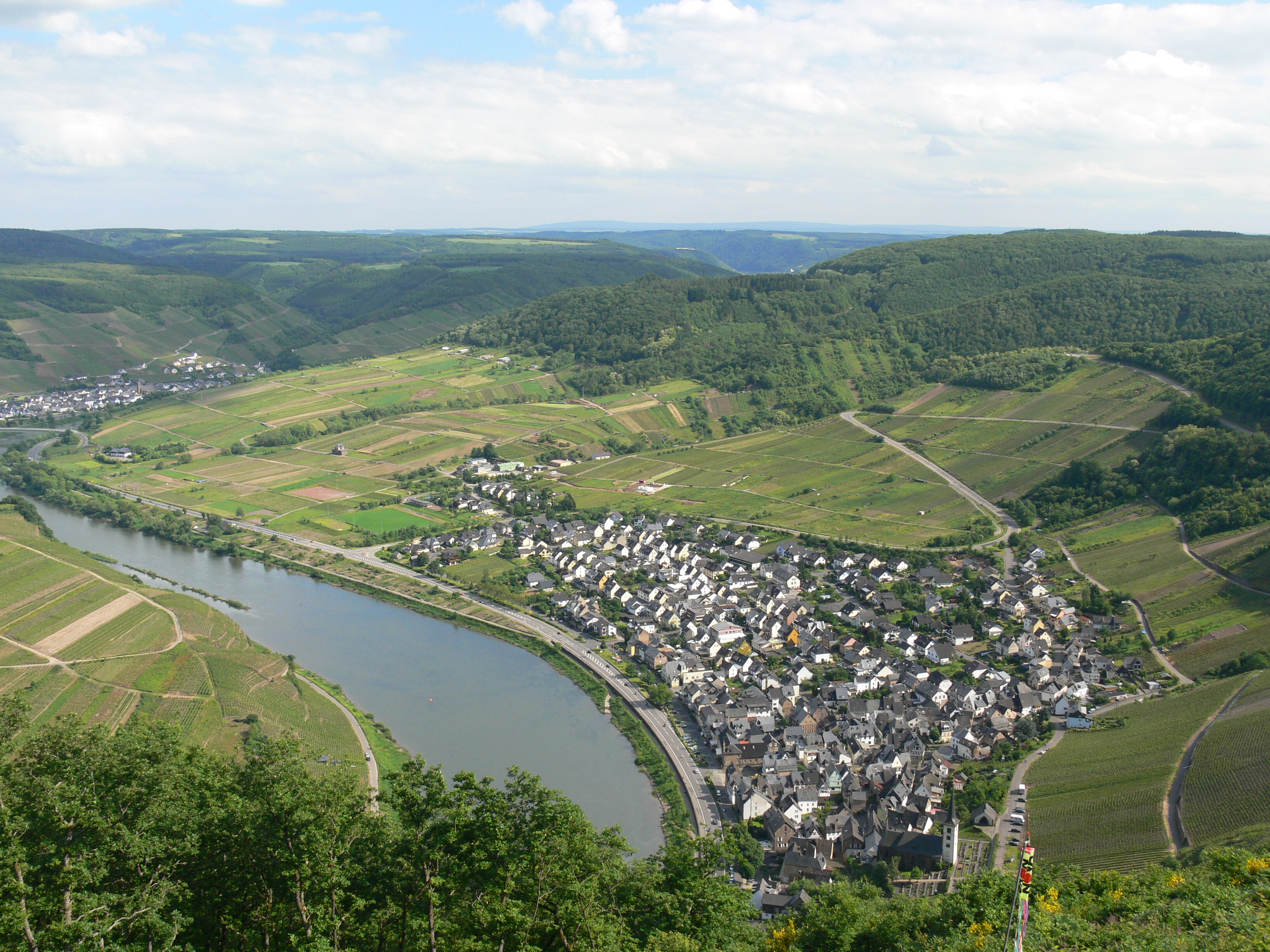
View of Bremm

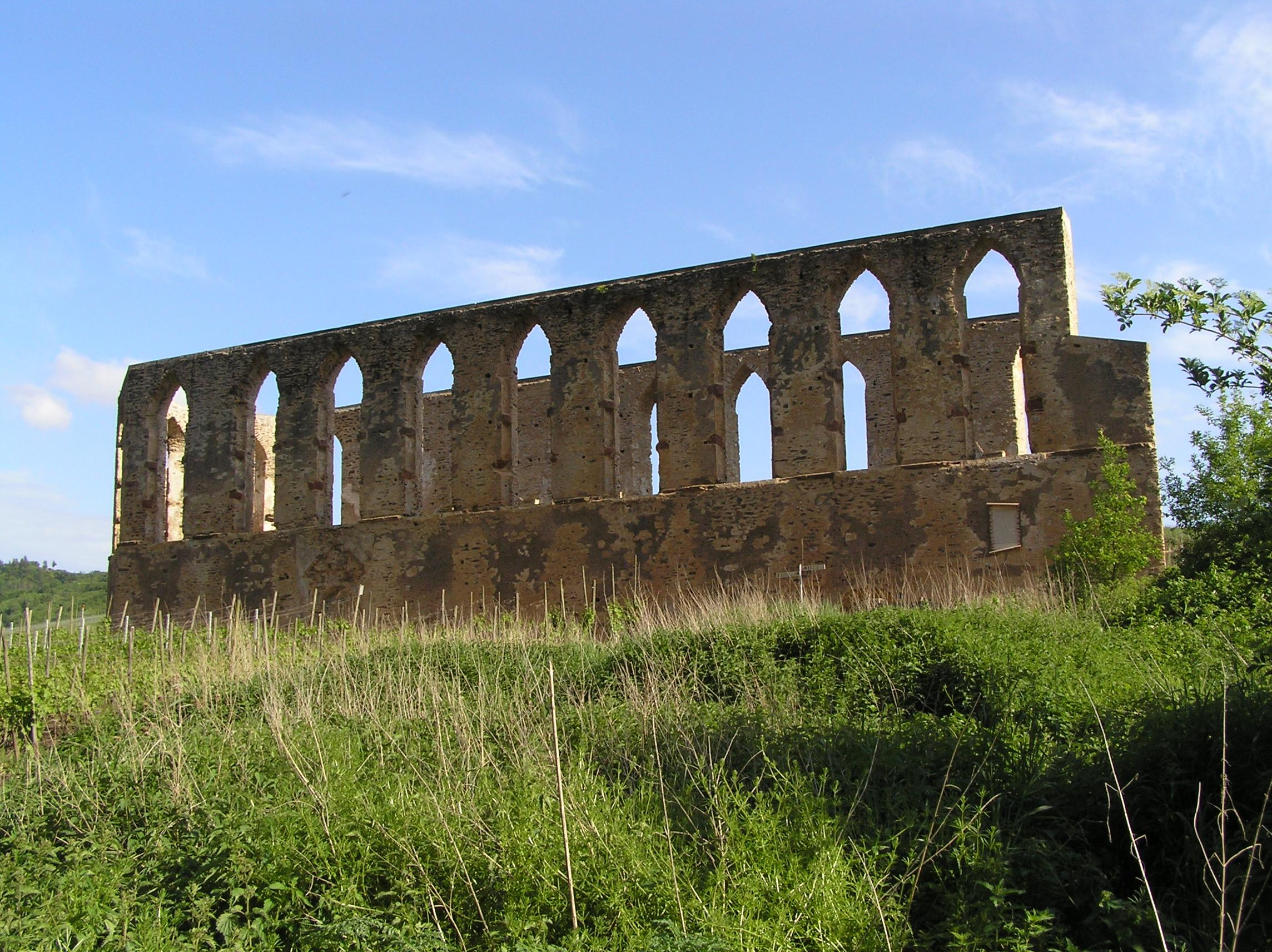
Stuben Convent near Bremm
