= Neef =

- Municipality
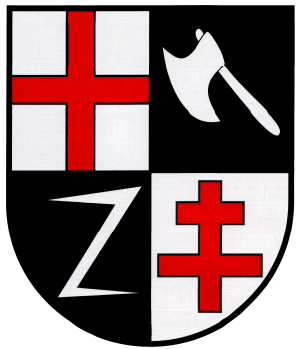
- Coat of arms

- Location of Neef within Cochem-Zell district
- Interactive map of Neef
- Location within Germany Location within Rhineland-Palatinate
- Coordinates: 50°5′30″N 7°8′21″E
- Country: Germany
- State: Rhineland-Palatinate
- District: Cochem-Zell
- Municipal assoc.: Zell (Mosel)

Government
  - Mayor (2019–24): Harald-Josef Franzen

Area
  - Total: 6.51 km^{2} (2.51 sq mi)
- Elevation: 90 m (300 ft)

Population (2025-12-31)
  - Total: 400
  - Density: 61/km^{2} (160/sq mi)
- Time zone: UTC+01:00 (CET)
  - Summer (DST): UTC+02:00 (CEST)
- Postal codes: 56858
- Dialling codes: 06542
- Vehicle registration: COC
- Website: www.weinort-neef.de

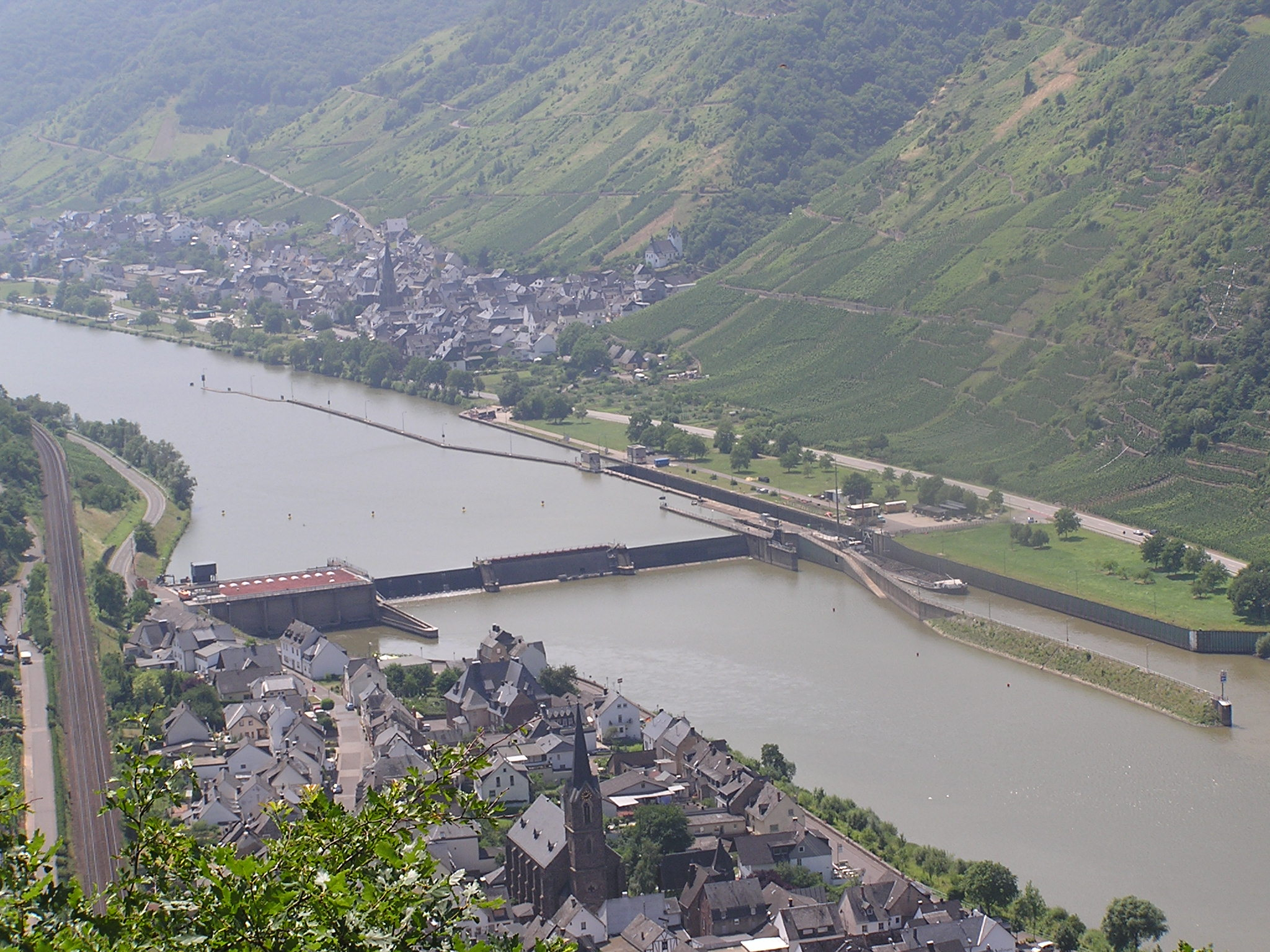
Neef (foreground) and Sankt Aldegund with a weir and a lock on the Moselle

Neef is an Ortsgemeinde – a municipality belonging to a Verbandsgemeinde, a kind of collective municipality—in the Cochem-Zell district in Rhineland-Palatinate, Germany. It belongs to the Verbandsgemeinde of Zell, whose seat is in the municipality of Zell an der Mosel. Neef is a winegrowing centre.

== Geography ==
The municipality lies on the river Moselle’s right bank between Cochem to the north and Zell to the south. Neef lies just downstream from Sankt Aldegund, which is found on the other side of the Moselle.

== History ==
Traces of human habitation reach back to the Middle Stone Age, about 4000 BC. It is believed that Neef had its first documentary mention about 698 in a donation document from Saint Hermine to the Abbey of Echternach, where it was listed as vien-nense. The first unmistakable documentary mention, however, came only in 1049, when Neef was named as vicus Navis iuxta fluvium Moselanum. In 1248, the castle in Neef was mentioned for the first time. Heinrich von Heinsberg traded the castle and holdings in Neef, Kastellaun and Kirchberg with his brother, Simon von Sponheim, making Neef part of the “further” County of Sponheim. In 1299, Eberhard von Sponheim-Kreuznach founded a new branch of the family Sponheim named after Neef. In the mid 15th century, the Electorate of Trier enfeoffed the Lords of Metzenhausen with Castle Neef. Archbishop of Trier Johann III of Metzenhausen was born at the castle. In 1552, the castle was attacked by the troops of Albert of Mainz, who wrought great destruction. The lordship over the village was long shared by the Stuben Monastery, the Electorate of Trier and various noble landholders. Beginning in 1794, Neef lay under French rule. Thereafter, the Stuben Monastery was a ruin. In 1815 Neef was assigned to the Kingdom of Prussia at the Congress of Vienna. Since 1946, it has been part of the then newly founded state of Rhineland-Palatinate. Under the Verwaltungsvereinfachungsgesetz (“Administration Simplification Law”) of 18 July 1970, with effect from 7 November 1970, the municipality was grouped into the Verbandsgemeinde of Zell.

== Politics ==
=== Municipal council ===
The council is made up of 8 council members, who were elected by majority vote at the municipal election held on 7 June 2009, and the honorary mayor as chairman.

=== Mayor ===
Neef's mayor is Harald-Josef Franzen.

=== Coat of arms ===
The municipality's arms might be described thus: Quarterly argent and sable, first a cross gules, second an axe bendwise of the first, third a cramp bendwise sinister of the first, and fourth a cross patriarchal of the third.

== Culture and sightseeing ==
=== Buildings ===
The following are listed buildings or sites in Rhineland-Palatinate’s Directory of Cultural Monuments:

- Saint Peter’s and Saint Paul's Catholic Parish Church (Pfarrkirche St. Peter und Paul), Neue Kirchstraße – Gothic Revival aisleless church, 1890–1891; whole complex with rectory
- Alte Kirchstraße – Romanesque churchtower, about 1140
- Alte Kirchstraße – cast-iron hand pump, latter half of the 19th century
- Alte Kirchstraße 31 – timber-frame house, partly solid, balloon frame, half-hipped roof, essentially from the 16th century
- Kloster-Stuben-Straße 24 – timber framing, possibly from the 17th century
- Kloster-Stuben-Straße 51 – timber-frame house, partly solid, plastered, hipped mansard roof, about 1800
- Moseluferstraße 6/7 – former castle house; Late Romanesque plastered building, trefoil window, mid 13th century, conversions in 1545 and early 18th century, additions from latter half of the 19th century
- Moselle riverside (monumental zone), Moseluferstraße 16-26 – expansion phase on the Moselle riverside in Moselländisch style
- Neue Kirchstraße (no number) – former rectory; quarrystone building, oriel turrets, about 1900; whole complex with the church
- Petersbergstraße 15 – quarrystone house, hipped mansard roof, about 1910
- Petersbergstraße/corner of Kloster-Stuben-Straße – timber-frame house, partly solid, front part possibly from the 16th or 17th century, back from the 19th century
- On the Petersberg – chapel, quire possibly from the 13th century, aisleless church, 16th or 17th century; graveyard: grotto, 19th century; grave cross, 19th or 20th century; sandstone wayside cross, 1759, completed 1763; cross, marked 1849; whole complex
- On the Petersberg, Way of the Cross leading to the chapel
- Treiser Mühle – Baroque pietà

== Economy and infrastructure ==
Winegrowing and tourism are the underpinnings of Neef's economy. A side route on the Mosel-Radweg (Moselle Cycle Path), which runs through the municipality, yearly brings thousands of tourists to the village, who often stay overnight. Vineyards can be found from the village itself right up to an elevation of 280 m. One peculiarity is the local vineyards at the bow in the Moselle near Neef: those on the Frauenberg and the Calmont are among Europe's steepest vineyards.

=== Transport ===
Running through the municipality is a Kreisstraße which is linked by bridge on the village's outskirts to Bundesstraße 49. Furthermore, hourly regional trains on the Koblenz–Trier railway stop at Neef after passing through the Petersberg Tunnel.

The Moselle itself is plied not only by cargo ships, but also by excursion craft. On the village's outskirts is found the St. Aldegund lock. The nearest major municipality is Bullay, 4 km to the south and on the same side of the Moselle. Structurally more important, however are Zell (10 km) and Cochem (23 km), the district seat.
