= Meulenwald =

Forest area in Germany

The Meulenwald, also called the Mühlenwald, is a bunter sandstone hill ridge, up to 448.8 m above sea level (NHN), in the southern part of the Eifel mountains in the counties of Trier-Saarburg and Bernkastel-Wittlich in the German state of Rhineland-Palatinate.

== Geography ==
=== Location ===
The Meulenwald is part of the Moselle Eifel and extends from Ehrang/Quint in the northern part of the borough of Trier in the southwest to the Wittlich Basin near Salmtal in the northeast and between Zemmer to the west and Hetzerath to the east. In the southwest it reaches the Kyll and in the northeast as far as the Salm, both tributaries of the Moselle; the streams of Quintbach and the Bendersbach flow within the hill range.

=== Natural regions ===
The Meulenwald forms a natural region subunit (Meulenwald, 270.7) within the major unit group of the East Eifel (No. 27) and major unit of the Moselle Eifel (270).

=== Hills ===
The hills and high points of the Meulenwald include the following – sorted by height in metres (m) above sea level (NHN):

- Kellerberg (448.8 m), immediately south of Dierscheid
- Steinenberg (423.1 m), immediately east of Naurath
- Zoonenberg (401.9 m), north of Ehrang
- Römerberg (359.0 m), southeast of Kordel
- Rothenberg (269.7 m), between Quint and Issel

=== Settlements ===
Settlements in and on the edge of the Meulenwald are:

- City of Trier: Ehrang/Quint
- Trier-Saarburg (county and southern part of the Meulenwald)
  - Trier-Land: collective municipality including Zemmer, Kordel
  - Schweich an der Römischen Weinstraße: collective municipality including Föhren, Naurath
- Bernkastel-Wittlich (county and northern part of the Meulenwald; hedge country)
  - Wittlich-Land: collective municipality including Bruch, Dierscheid, Dodenburg, Dreis, Gladbach, Heckenmünster, Heidweiler, Hetzerath, Erlenbach, Niersbach, Greverath, Dörbach, Sehlem.
