= Klausen, Germany =

Klausen
- Municipality
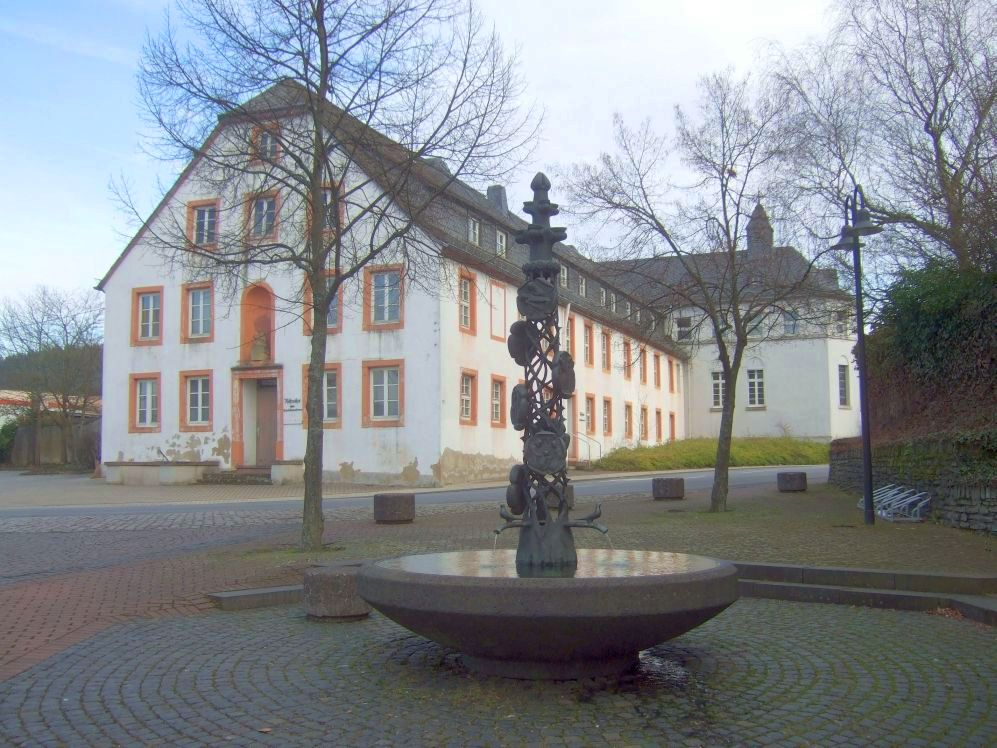
- Monastery

- Coat of arms

- Location of Klausen within Bernkastel-Wittlich district
- Interactive map of Klausen
- Location within Germany Location within Rhineland-Palatinate
- Coordinates: 49°54′20.6″N 6°52′58.36″E
- Country: Germany
- State: Rhineland-Palatinate
- District: Bernkastel-Wittlich
- Municipal assoc.: Wittlich-Land
- Subdivisions: 2

Government
  - Mayor (2019–24): Alois Meyer

Area
  - Total: 9.22 km^{2} (3.56 sq mi)
- Elevation: 245 m (804 ft)

Population (2025-12-31)
  - Total: 1,479
  - Density: 160/km^{2} (415/sq mi)
- Time zone: UTC+01:00 (CET)
  - Summer (DST): UTC+02:00 (CEST)
- Postal codes: 54524
- Dialling codes: 06578
- Vehicle registration: WIL
- Website: www.klausen.de

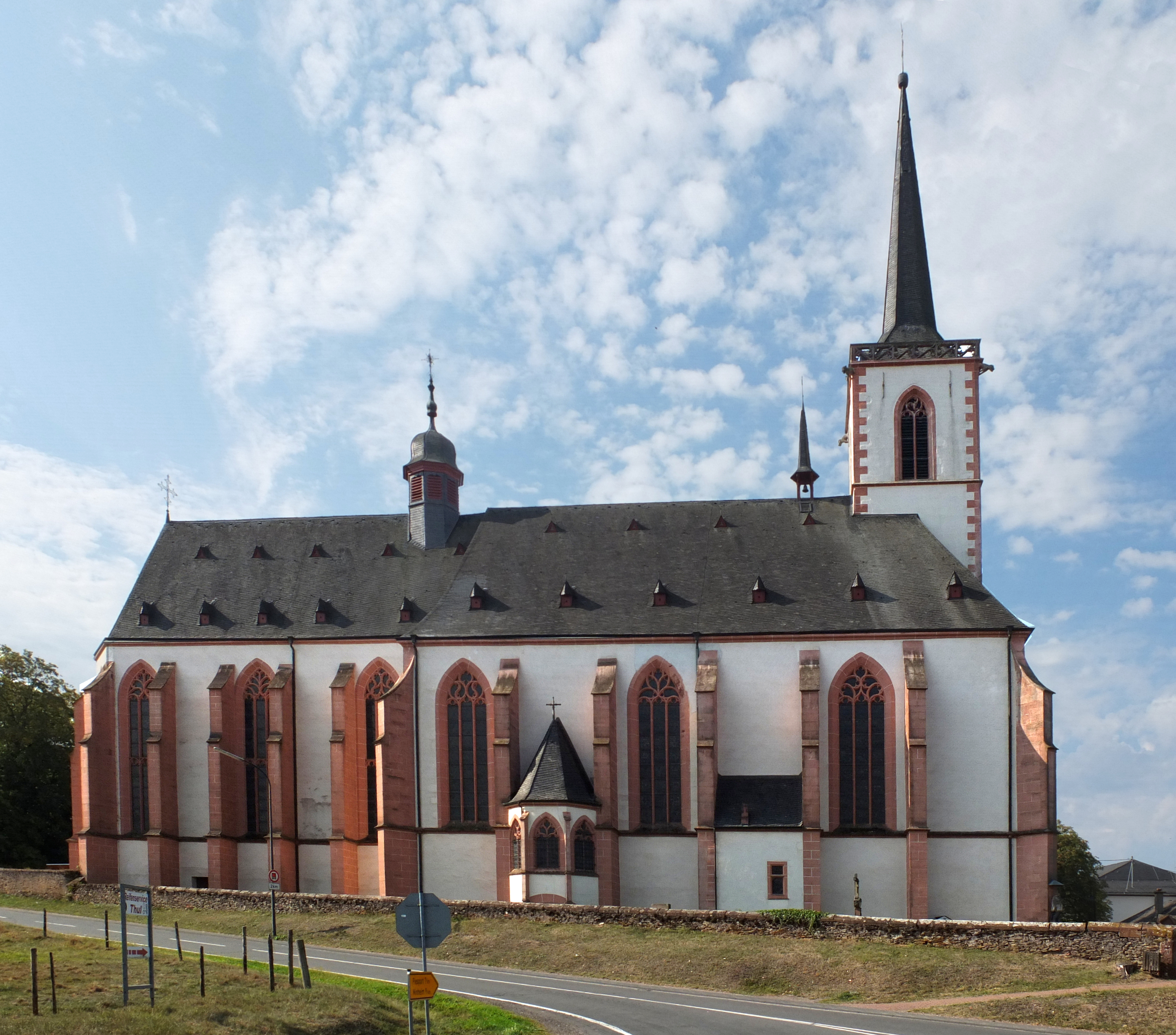
Pilgrimage church in Klausen

Klausen (German pronunciation: [ˈklaʊzn̩]) is an Ortsgemeinde – a municipality belonging to a Verbandsgemeinde, a kind of collective municipality – in the Bernkastel-Wittlich district in Rhineland-Palatinate, Germany.

== Geography ==
=== Location ===
The municipality lies in the southern Eifel. The nearest middle centres are Wittlich and Bernkastel-Kues. The Grönbach and the Kramesbach empty into the Salm. Klausen belongs to the Verbandsgemeinde of Wittlich-Land, whose seat is in Wittlich, although that town is itself not in the Verbandsgemeinde.

=== Constituent communities ===
Klausen’s Ortsteile are Klausen, Pohlbach, Krames, Neu-Minheim, Hof Weidenhaag and Pohlbacher Mühle.

=== Climate ===
Yearly precipitation in Klausen amounts to 749 mm, falling into the middle third of the precipitation chart for all Germany. At 51% of the German Weather Service’s weather stations, lower figures are recorded. The driest month is February. The most rainfall comes in August. In that month, precipitation is 1.4 times what it is in February. Precipitation varies only minimally and is spread out quite evenly throughout the year.

== History ==
In 1442, Klausen had its first documentary mention when Eberhard, who revered Mary, put up, on a spot where nothing had yet been built (but now the site of the Church of Eberhardsklausen) a wooden figure showing Mary with Jesus in her arms after having been taken off the cross (Pietà). The figure was soon moved into a so-called Marienhäuschen (“little Mary house”). Two years later came the building of the first chapel on this spot. On 25 March 1449, the Late Gothic Church of Mary (Marienkirche), work on which had begun in 1446 under Antwerp master builder Cluys, was consecrated by Archbishop of Trier Jakob von Sierck. About 1480 came the carved high altar, which is still to be found in the church today. It is one of the oldest preserved examples of “Antwerp altarpiece” production. A monastery of Augustinian canons from the Congregation of Windesheim, built near the church, was consecrated in 1461. The church soon developed into a pilgrimage site that still draws worshippers today in some numbers.

In the course of the War of the Polish Succession, Imperial troops under Friedrich Heinrich von Seckendorff’s command beat a French army led by Marshal François de Franquetot de Coigny on 20 October 1735 at the Battle of Clausen (commonly spelt thus in English history texts).

In 1802, the Augustinian canons’ monastery was dissolved. The monastery church became a parish church that also ministered to the many pilgrims. In 1927, the parish in Klausen was raised to deaconry. On 7 June 1969 came the amalgamation of the municipalities of Krames and Pohlbach into the municipality of Klausen (the old Eberhardsklausen with the monastery zone was not a self-administering municipality, but rather it was shared between the municipalities of Krames and Pohlbach). Until the amalgamation of the municipalities of Krames and Pohlbach, Klausen was merely the parish’s name.

In 1988, Klausen was awarded the statewide first prize in the contest “for exemplary ecological performance” and was the winner in its Regierungsbezirk in the contest Unser Dorf soll schöner werden (“Our village should become lovelier”).

== Politics ==
=== Municipal council ===
The council is made up of 16 council members, who were elected by proportional representation at the municipal election held on 7 June 2009, and the honorary mayor as chairman.

The municipal election held on 7 June 2009 yielded the following results:

Year	FBL Klausen	WG Kohl	FWG Maes	WG Dietzen	SPD	Total
2009	11	5	–	–	–	16 seats
2004	7	–	5	3	1	16 seats

=== Mayor ===
The Mayor is Alois Meyer, who reached the mayoralty in a runoff election on 27 June 2004.

=== Coat of arms ===
The German blazon reads: In Gold eine zur Kreuzblume erblühte blaue Lilie mit doppeltem grünen Fruchtknoten.

The municipality’s arms might in English heraldic language be described thus: Or a fleur-de-lis, the middle petal winged and charged with a cross azure, and doubly seeded vert.

== Economy and infrastructure ==
Klausen has at its disposal a network of hiking trails roughly 60 km long.

=== Transport ===
Klausen is connected to the Autobahn A 1 through the Salmtal interchange one kilometre away. Landesstraßen (State Roads) 47 (from Trier to Machern) and 50 (from Piesport to Binsfeld) both run right through the municipality and form the links to the neighbouring municipalities: Salmtal in the north, Piesport in the south, Esch and Sehlem in the east and Osann-Monzel in the west.

=== Local public transport ===
Klausen lies in cell 338 in the Verkehrsverbund Region Trier (VRT) plan and has all together 5 bus stops at its disposal.

Bus route 304 of the Rhein-Mosel Verkehrsgesellschaft (RMV) links Klausen by way of Altrich several times daily (Saturdays only once; Sundays not at all) with the district seat of Wittlich, where transfers are possible in all directions at the bus station. RMV bus route 212 runs direct buses twice daily on weekdays between Klausen and the nearest city, Trier, passing through Esch, Rivenich, Hetzerath, Föhren and Schweich on the way.

The nearest Regionalbahn stations are Salmtal and Sehlem (Kr Wittlich) on the Koblenz-Trier railway line, both of which are some 5 km away from Klausen. Wittlich’s main railway station, some 15 km away from Klausen, is the nearest long-distance station. It can be reached by bus with only one transfer to route 301 or 305 at the Wittlich bus station, and the trip takes, depending on where one transfers, between 20 and 87 minutes.

== Images ==
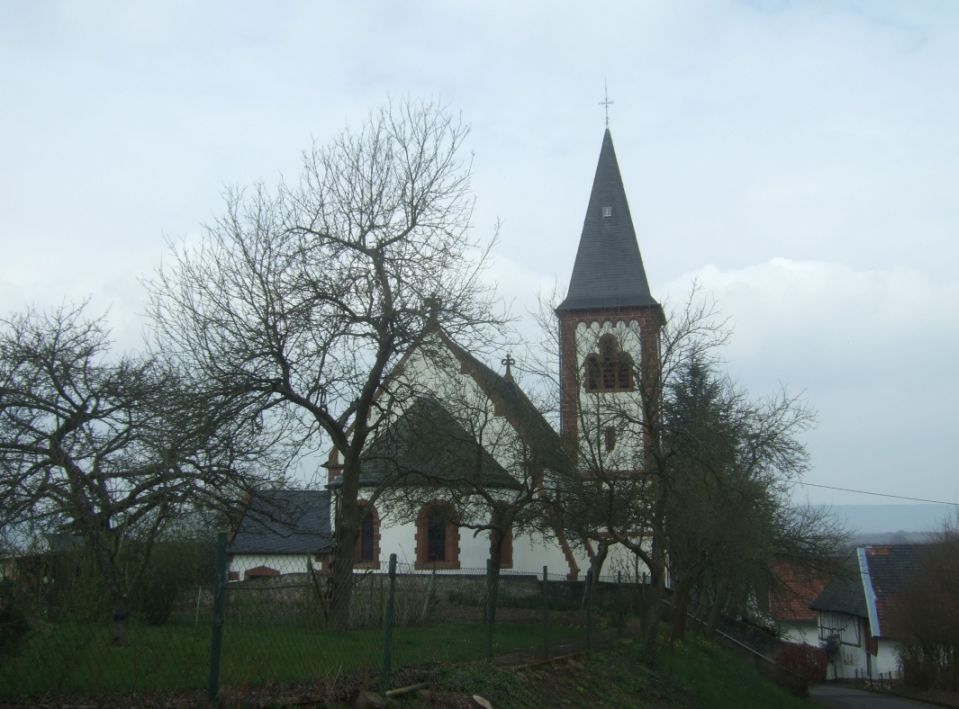
Branch church in Krames

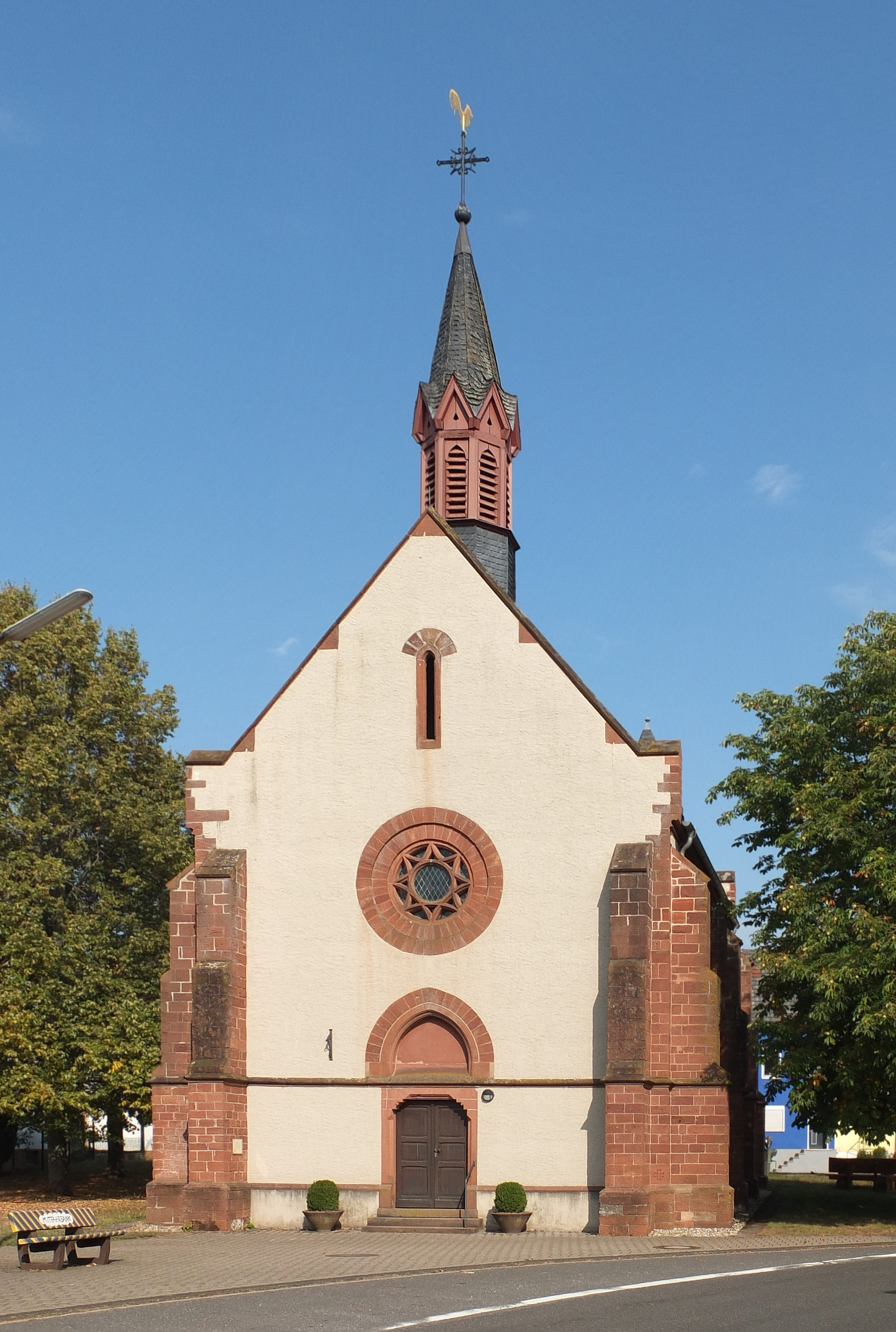
Branch church in Pohlbach

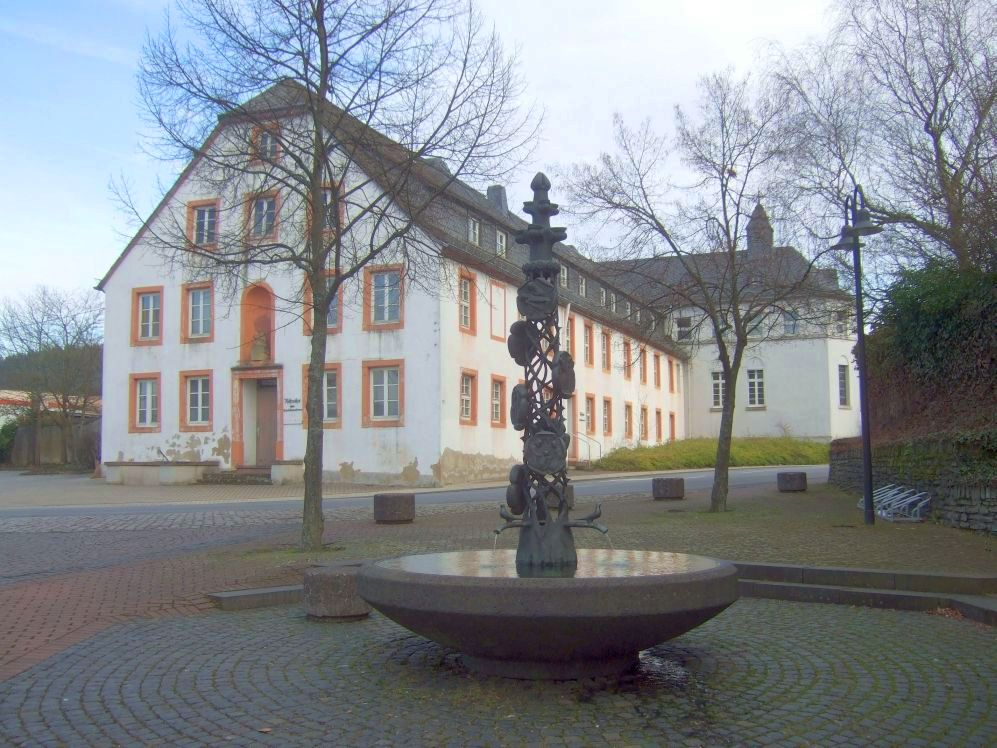
Monastery in Klausen,
in the foreground the Marienbrunnen

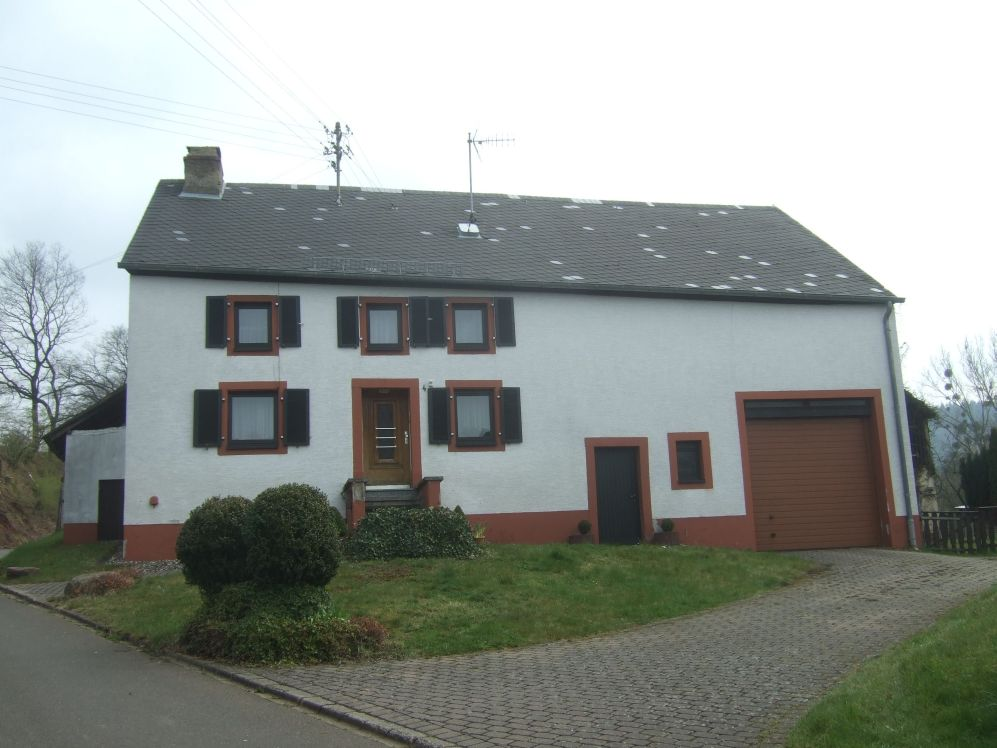
Farmhouse in Pohlbach

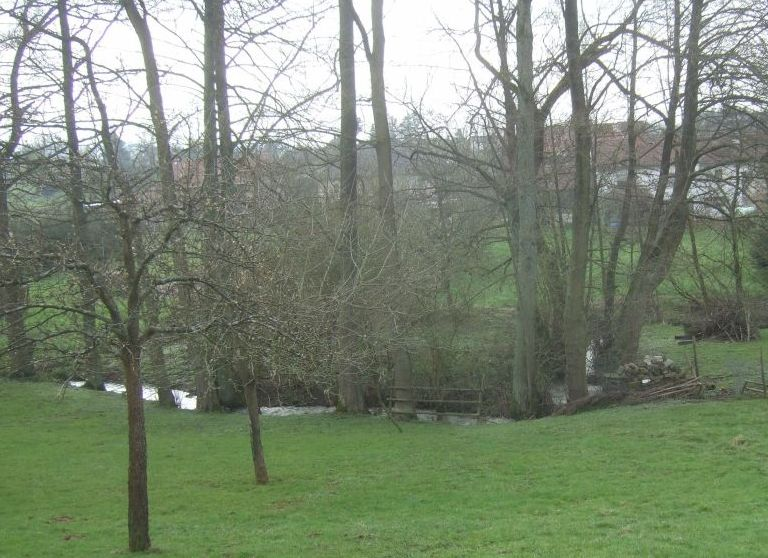
Grönbach
