= Kellerberg =

Kellerberg may refer to:

Hills and high points in Germany

- Kellerberg (Forchheim) (ca. 340 m), hill near Forchheim, county of Forchheim, Upper Franconia, Bavaria
- Kellerberg (Langeln) (187.1 m), hill near Langeln in the northern Harz Foreland, county of Harz, Saxony-Anhalt
- Kellerberg (Meulenwald) (448.7 m), near Dierscheid, highest hill in the Meulenwald (South Eifel), county of Bernkastel-Wittlich, Rhineland-Palatinate
- Kellerberg (Niederdollendorf), spur of the Petersberg in the Siebengebirge near Königswinter, Rhein-Sieg-Kreis, North Rhine-Westphalia
- Kellerberg (Taunus), hill near Bad Homburg vor der Höhe in the Taunus, Hochtaunuskreis, Hesse
- Kellerberg (Waldheim, Saxony), hill in Waldheim, county of Mittelsachsen, Saxony. On it stands St. Nicholas’ Church, Waldheim
- Kellerberg (Bömenzien) (29.3 m), near Bömenzien, municipality of Zehrental, county of Stendal, Saxony-Anhalt

Place

- Kellerberg (Weißenstein), village in the municipality of Weißenstein, district of Villach-Land, Carinthia, Austria

Nature reserve

- Kellerberg (nature reserve), nature reserve in the municipality of Göhrde, county of Lüchow-Dannenberg, Lower Saxony
