= Wittlich Depression =

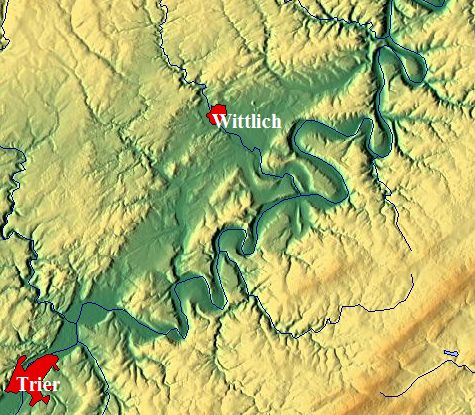
The Wittlich Depression

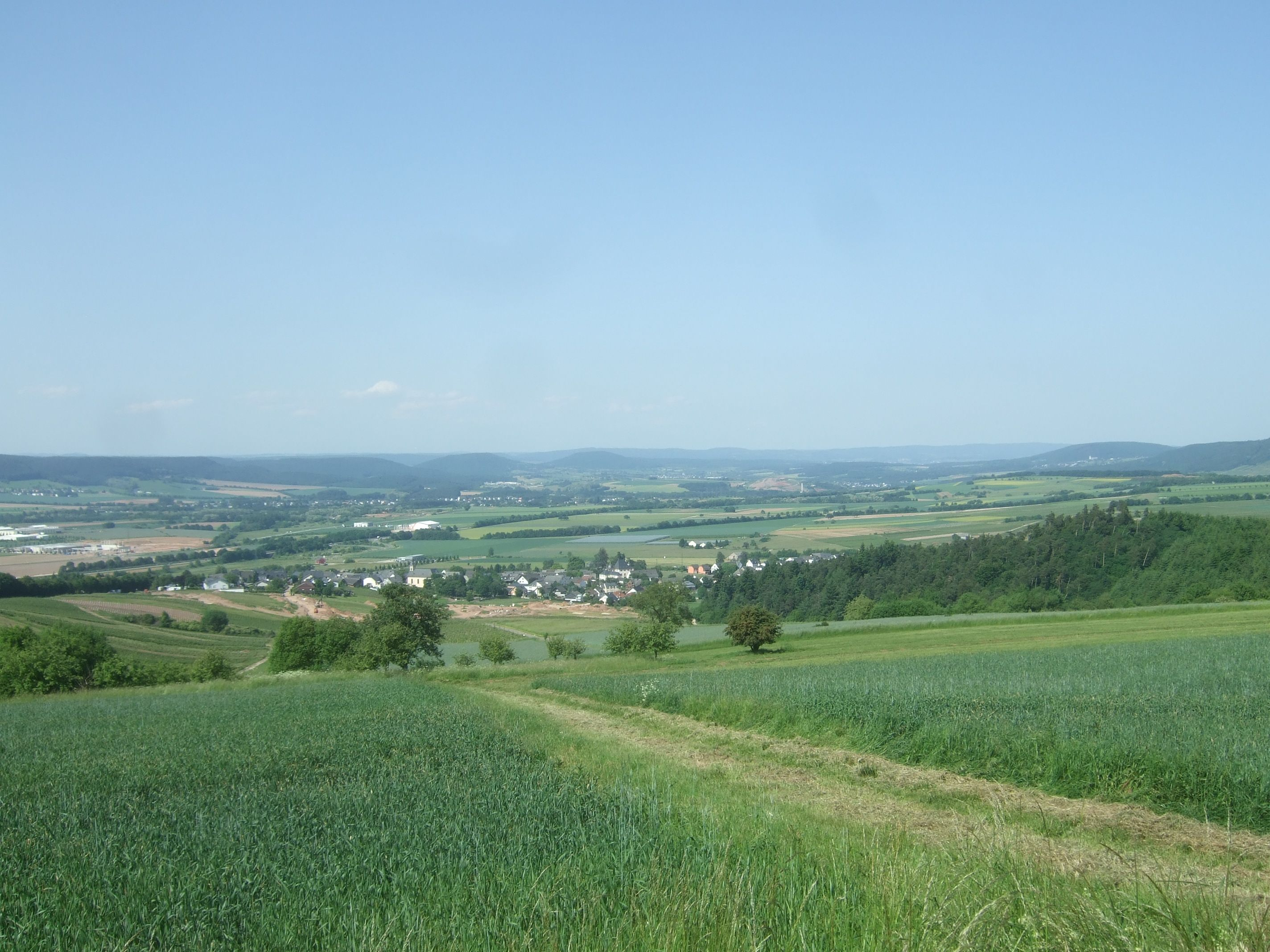
The Wittlich Depression near Bekond

The Wittlich Depression (German: Wittlicher Senke or Wittlicher Rotliegend-Senke), less commonly, the Wittlich Basin, is the continuation of the Trier Valley in a northeasterly direction. It is not only recognisable in the terrain as an elongated depression, but also from its geological structure as a basin. From a natural region perspective, the Wittlich Depression (252) is one of three major units of the Moselle Valley major unit group Moseltal (25). The Wittlich Depression Cycleway (Radweg Wittlicher Senke) runs through the region.

== Geography ==
The Wittlich Depression runs for about 45 kilometres from Schweich in the southwest almost to the River Moselle northeast of Wittlich. At its widest point it is about 7 kilometres across. Its average height is about 180 m above sea level (NN), its lowest point is near Wengerohr in the vicinity of Wittlich and on the Lieser, a tributary of the Moselle in Rhineland-Palatinate. The depression is bounded to the northwest by the Meulenwald forest, to the southeast by the Moselle Hills and to the east by the Kondelwald.

The Wittlich Depression is drained by the Lieser and its tributaries. The jointed rocks below the surface hold a larger amount of groundwater than the area around the depression. The climate is similar to the mild conditions of the Moselle Valley. Due to its sheltered location, tobacco is grown in the valley.

=== Natural regions ===
The Wittlich Depression is divided into the following natural regions:

- (to 25 - Moselle Valley)
  - 251 Wittlich Depression
    - 251.0 Southwestern Wittlich Depression
      - 251.00 Föhren Kuppen Land (between Schweich, Föhren und Bekond)
      - 251.01 Hetzerath Plateau (around Hetzerath)
    - 251.1 Central Wittlich Depression
      - 251.10 Sehlem Salm Valley (Salm from Rivenich to Salmtal)
      - 251.11 Dreis Valley (between Dreis and Wittlich)
      - 251.12 Wittlich Valley (Wittlich and the regions west-northwest and south-southwest:
        Lieser from Wittlich to Platten; northeast to Bausendorf)
    - 251.2 Klausen Hill Country (from Klausen to south of Wittlich)
    - 251.3 Bausendorf Alf Valley (Alf valley from Bausendorf to below Bengel)

== Literature ==
- Wilhelm Meyer (1986), Geologie der Eifel (in German), Stuttgart: Schweizerbart'sche Verlagsbuchhandlung, pp. 534ff, ISBN 3-510-65127-8
- Paul Dorn (original author); Roland Walter et al. (reviser) (1992), Geologie von Mitteleuropa (in German) (5th, fully revised ed.), Stuttgart: Schweizerbart'sche Verlagsbuchhandlung, pp. 171, 181, ISBN 3-510-65149-9
- Landesamt für Geologie und Bergbau Rhineland-Palatinate (Hrsg.): Geologie von Rhineland-Palatinate. E. Schweizerbart'sche Verlagsbuchhandlung, Stuttgart, 2005, ISBN 3-510-65215-0.
