= Kellerberg (Meulenwald) =

- Location within Rhineland-Palatinate

Highest point
- Elevation: 448.8 m above sea level (NHN) (1,472 ft)
- Coordinates: 49°53′40″N 6°45′39″E

Geography
- Location: Near Dierscheid; Bernkastel-Wittlich, Rhineland-Palatinate (Deutschland)
- Parent range: Meulenwald (Eifel)

The Kellerberg is a hill, 448.8 m above sea level (NHN), and the highest point of the Eifel part of the Meulenwald and of the collective municipality of Wittlich-Land. It rises near Dierscheid in the county of Bernkastel-Wittlich in the German state of Rhineland-Palatinate. At the top is the Kellerberg Observation Tower.

== Location ==
The Kellerberg rises in the Meulenwald forest, part of the Moselle Eifel. Its summit lies 0.5 km south-southeast of Dierscheid and belongs to its municipality; it is 2.2 km west-northwest of Erlenbach, in the municipality of Hetzerath, and 1.7 km north-northeast of Naurath in the county of Trier-Saarburg. Streams that rise on the hillside include the Weischbach and the Orschbach in the east, the Gitzertbach in the south-southwest and the Stahlbach in the west.

On topographic maps a spot height of 448.7 m appears in the vicinity of the summit. On the Kellerberg are parts of the protected landscape of the Meulenwald and Trier Municipal Forest (Meulenwald und Stadtwald Trier), CDDA No. 322963; established 1990; 132.8046 km²).

== Kellerberg Observation Tower ==
In 1999 the 21.7-metre-high Kellerberg Observation Tower was built in a modern wood and steel design. The covered tower has a triangular plan and consists of seven larch logs that are connected by metal strips. The whole structure is tension with steel cables. Its observation platform is 18 metres high and offers views far across the Eifel and to the Hunsrück. For example, Klausen and its pilgrimage church may be seen.
