= Garz =

Garz could refer to one of several places:

- Garz (Havelberg) - part of the city of Havelberg, Stendal, Saxony-Anhalt
- Garz (Rügen) - a city on the island of Rügen, Germany
- Garz (Usedom) - a smaller town on the island of Usedom adjacent to the Heringsdorf Airport and the city of Świnoujście, Poland
- Groß Garz ("Great Garz") — a municipality in the district of Stendal, Saxony-Anhalt.
