= Dodenburg =

- Municipality
- Coat of arms

- Location of Dodenburg within Bernkastel-Wittlich district
- Interactive map of Dodenburg
- Location within Germany Location within Rhineland-Palatinate
- Coordinates: 49°54′50.91″N 06°46′46.43″E
- Country: Germany
- State: Rhineland-Palatinate
- District: Bernkastel-Wittlich
- Municipal assoc.: Wittlich-Land

Government
  - Mayor (2019–24): Iris Weber

Area
  - Total: 3.84 km^{2} (1.48 sq mi)
- Elevation: 346 m (1,135 ft)

Population (2025-12-31)
  - Total: 94
  - Density: 24/km^{2} (63/sq mi)
- Time zone: UTC+01:00 (CET)
  - Summer (DST): UTC+02:00 (CEST)
- Postal codes: 54518
- Dialling codes: 06508
- Vehicle registration: WIL
- Website: www.dodenburg.de

Dodenburg (German pronunciation: [ˈdoːdn̩bʊʁk]) is an Ortsgemeinde – a municipality belonging to a Verbandsgemeinde, a kind of collective municipality – in the Bernkastel-Wittlich district in Rhineland-Palatinate, Germany.

== Geography ==
The municipality lies in the Eifel some 16 km west of Wittlich in the middle of broad mixed forests. It belongs to the Verbandsgemeinde of Wittlich-Land, whose seat is in Wittlich, although that town is itself not in the Verbandsgemeinde.

== History ==
In 1231, the Archbishop of Trier Theoderich documented and confirmed an accord from Himmerod Abbey with the knight Werner von der Pforte zu Bruch dealing with plots of land in Rodenerde (a long vanished village) "not far from Dodenburg and monastery" (Heckenmünster). Werner von der Pforte was Theoderich von Bruch’s liegeman.

The Dodenburg itself – a castle (Burg is German for "castle") – had its first documentary mention in Trier documents from 1279 under the name Dudenburg. This moated castle gave the place its name. It was converted between 1791 and 1794 in the Baroque style by the Counts of Kesselstatt. The two-winged building with the round corner towers, which still recall the former moated castle, is likewise today under private ownership. The park complex with its avenues still exists in its original form.

Beginning in 1794, Dodenburg lay under French rule. In 1814 it was assigned to the Kingdom of Prussia at the Congress of Vienna. Since 1946, it has been part of the then newly founded state of Rhineland-Palatinate.

== Politics ==
=== Municipal council ===
The council is made up of 6 council members, who were elected by majority vote at the municipal election held on 7 June 2009, and the honorary mayor as chairman.

=== Coat of arms ===
The German blazon reads: Der Schild ist von links oben nach rechts unten geteilt. In der rechten oberen Hälfte oben in Silber ein roter Drache, in der linken unteren Hälfte 9 mal in Silber und Blau quer geteiltes Feld.

The municipality’s arms might in English heraldic language be described thus: Per bend sinister, argent a dragon rampant sans forelegs wings displayed gules, and barry of ten argent and azure.

The numbers referring to the sinister (armsbearer’s left, viewer’s right) side ("9" and "ten") do not match because English heraldry counts the number of bars, whereas German heraldry counts the number of divisions.

The red dragon on a silver field is the arms once borne by the House of Kesselstatt. Dodenburg’s history was shaped considerably by the Imperial Counts (Reichsgrafen) of Kesselstatt. The Dodenburg castle, a former moated castle, was through a shared inheritance bequeathed in 1790 to Kasimir Friedrich von Kesselstatt. In the mid 18th century, he had been enfeoffed with it. The Luxembourg tinctures (blue and silver) symbolize the village’s former allegiance to the Duchy of Luxembourg.

The arms have been borne since 1981.
