= Altrich =

- Municipality
- Coat of arms

- Location of Altrich within Bernkastel-Wittlich district
- Interactive map of Altrich
- Location within Germany Location within Rhineland-Palatinate
- Coordinates: 49°57′29″N 06°54′41″E
- Country: Germany
- State: Rhineland-Palatinate
- District: Bernkastel-Wittlich
- Municipal assoc.: Wittlich-Land

Government
  - Mayor (2019–24): Sylvia Stoffel-Leuchter

Area
  - Total: 16.25 km^{2} (6.27 sq mi)
- Elevation: 180 m (590 ft)

Population (2025-12-31)
  - Total: 1,703
  - Density: 104.8/km^{2} (271.4/sq mi)
- Time zone: UTC+01:00 (CET)
  - Summer (DST): UTC+02:00 (CEST)
- Postal codes: 54518
- Dialling codes: 06571
- Vehicle registration: WIL
- Website: www.altrich.de

Altrich is an Ortsgemeinde – a municipality belonging to a Verbandsgemeinde, a kind of collective municipality – in the Bernkastel-Wittlich district in Rhineland-Palatinate, Germany.

== Geography ==
Altrich lies some 4 km south of the district seat, Wittlich. It belongs to the Verbandsgemeinde of Wittlich-Land, whose seat is in Wittlich, although that town is itself not in the Verbandsgemeinde.

== History ==
The parish church is consecrated to Saint Andrew. In 952, Altrich had its first documentary mention – even earlier than the neighbouring town of Wittlich. The first mention in writing came as early as 636 in which it was named as Alta Regia.

== Politics ==
=== Municipal council ===
The council is made up of 16 council members, who were elected by proportional representation at the municipal election held on 7 June 2009, and the honorary mayor as chairman.

The municipal election held on 7 June 2009 yielded the following results:

Year	SPD	CDU	FWG	Total
2009	2	5	9	16 seats
2004	5	5	6	16 seats

=== Coat of arms ===
The German blazon reads: Schild Rot und Weiß gespalten, vorne ein weißes Andreaskreuz, hinten 2 (2:1) rote Kugeln.

The municipality's arms might in English heraldic language be described thus: Per pale gules a saltire couped argent, and argent three roundels of the first.

The saltire (X-shaped cross) on the dexter (armsbearer's right, viewer's left) side stands for Saint Andrew, the local church's patron saint who was depicted in the old court seal from 1764. The three roundels on the sinister (armsbearer's left, viewer's right) side refer to a knightly family that named itself after Altrich and whose existence in the 14th century is witnessed. The tinctures gules and argent (red and silver) are a reference to the village's former allegiance to the Electorate of Trier

Altrich was granted the right to bear its own arms in 1971.

== Culture and sightseeing ==
- Remains of a Roman wall near the Neuenhof (outside Altrich towards Klausen)
- The “Cusanus Columns” from the former parish church, now in the parish garden at Andreasstraße 31
- The “Fat Oak” (dicke Eiche) – a roughly 300-year-old natural monument in the village's southwest (on the Schneidkaul road extension)

== Economy and infrastructure ==
The municipality has a kindergarten, a single-stream primary school and a multipurpose area with a gymnasium.

== Pictures ==
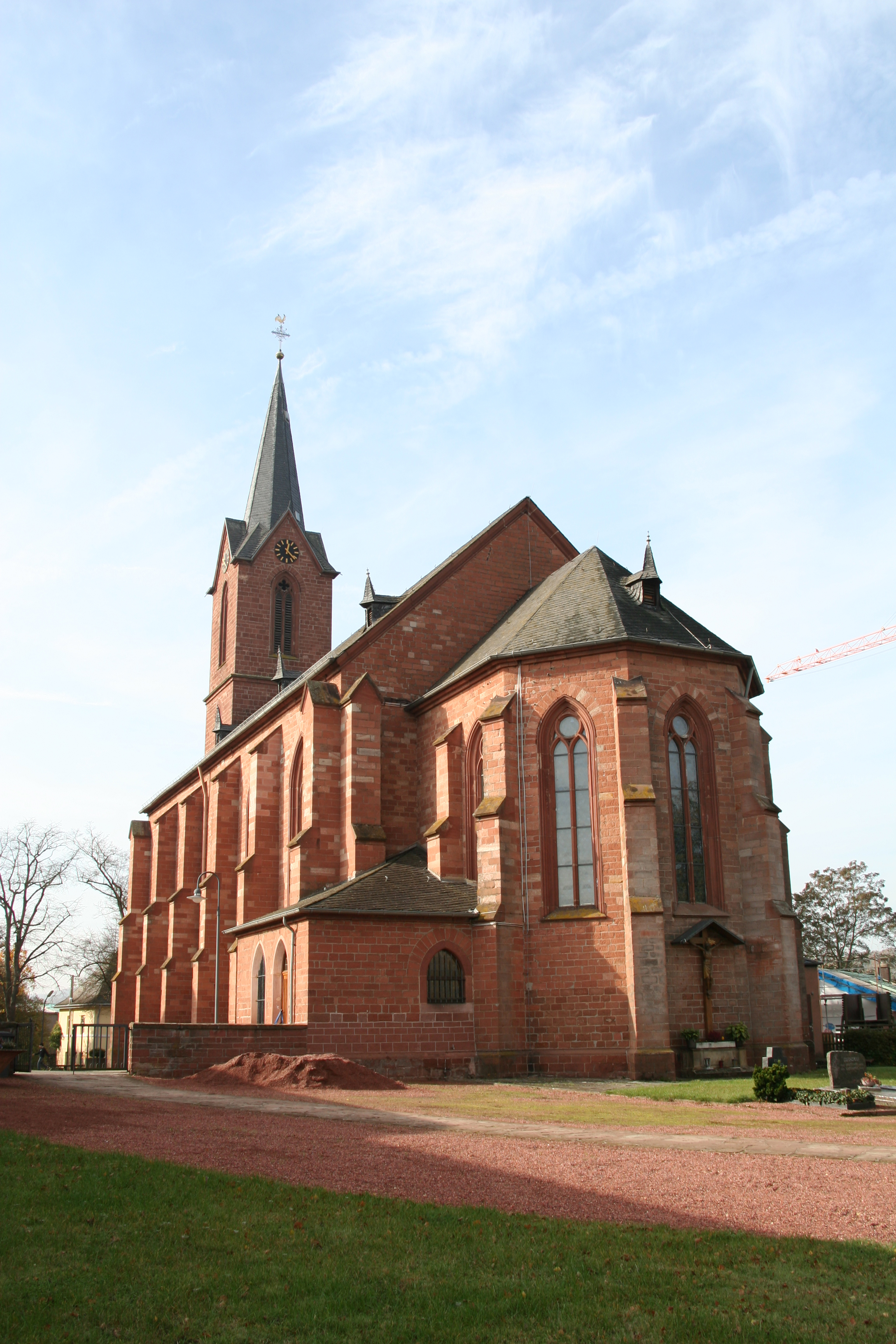
Saint Andrew's Parish Church

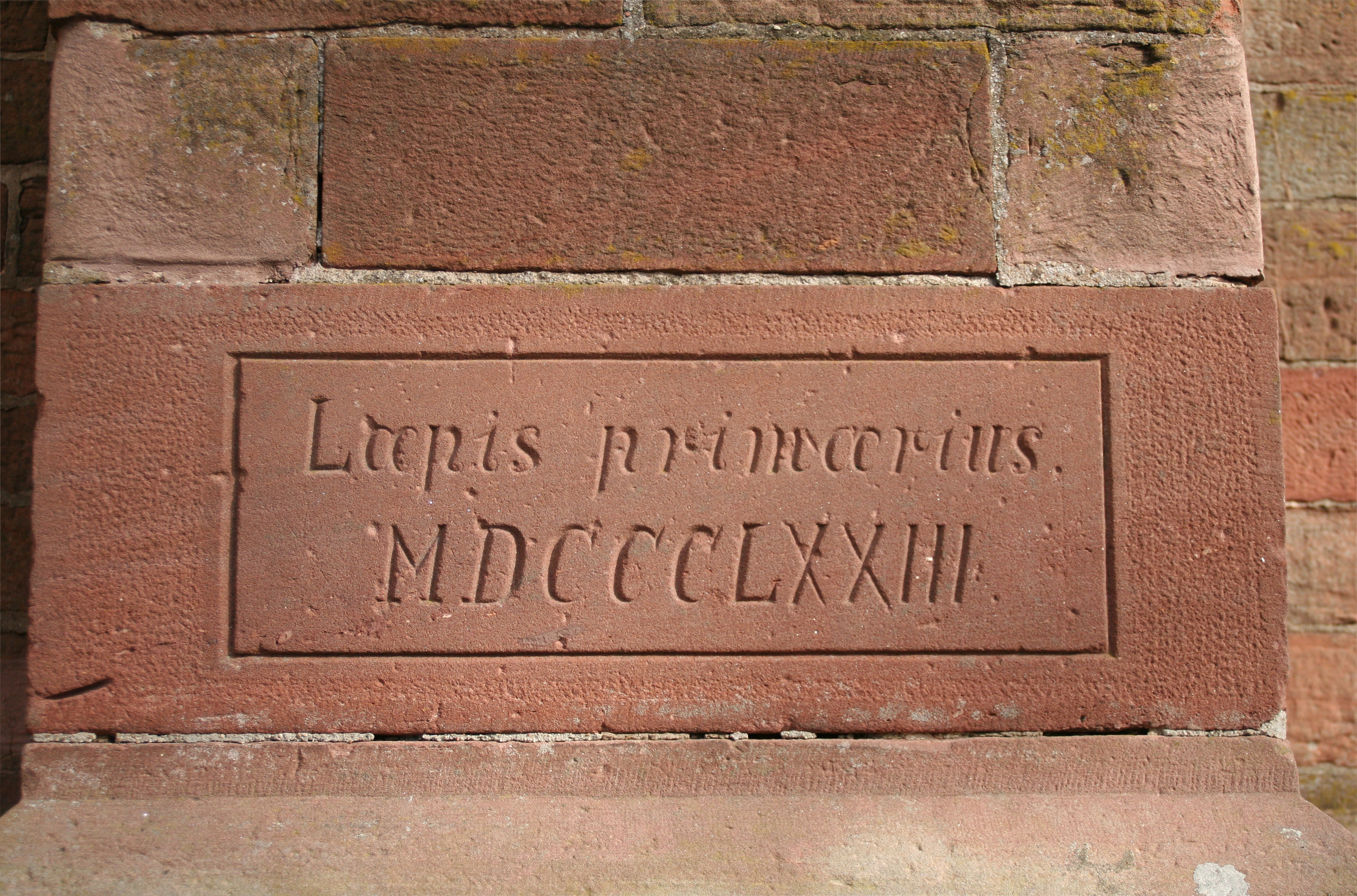
Saint Andrew's Parish Church

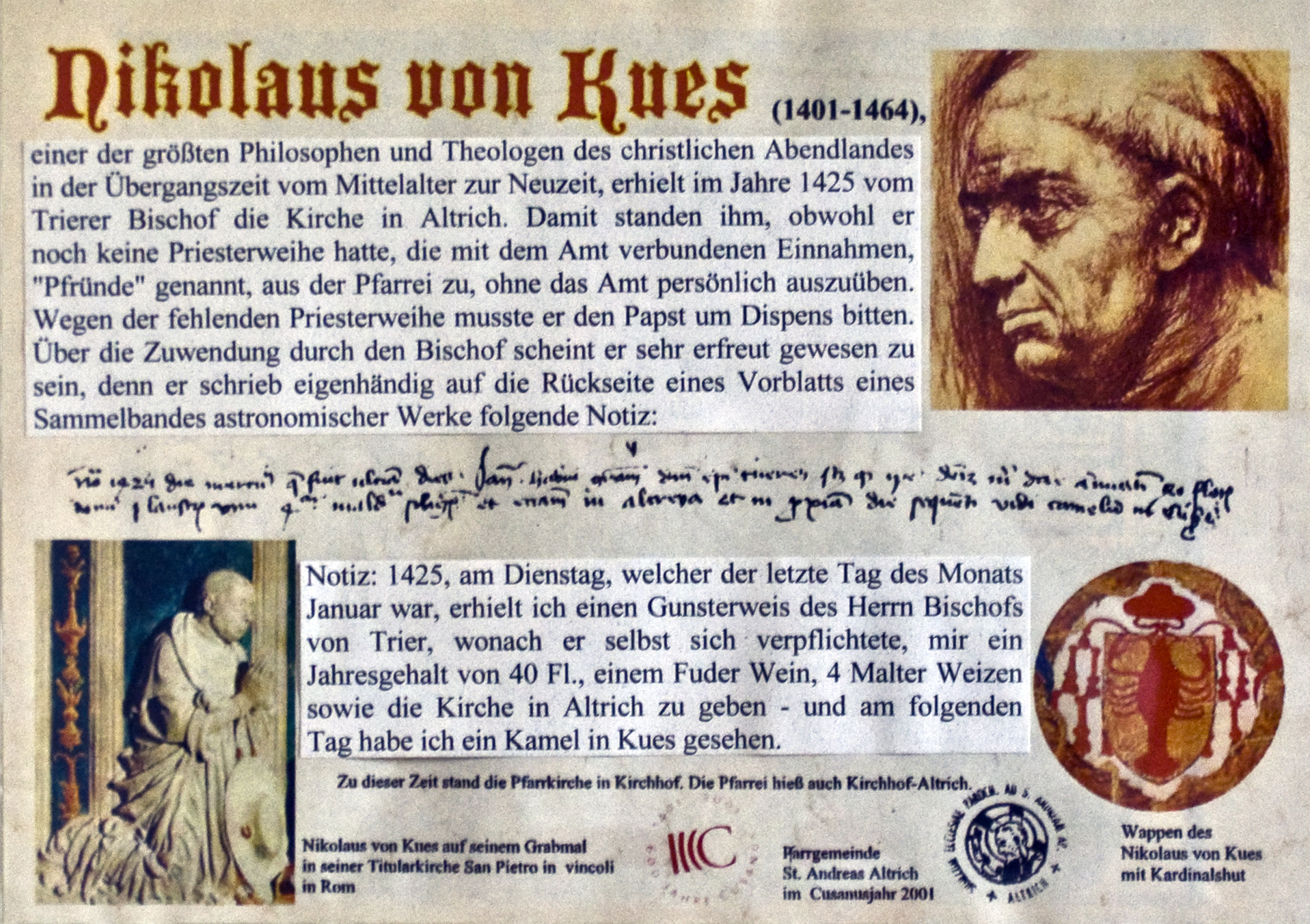
Saint Andrew's Parish Church

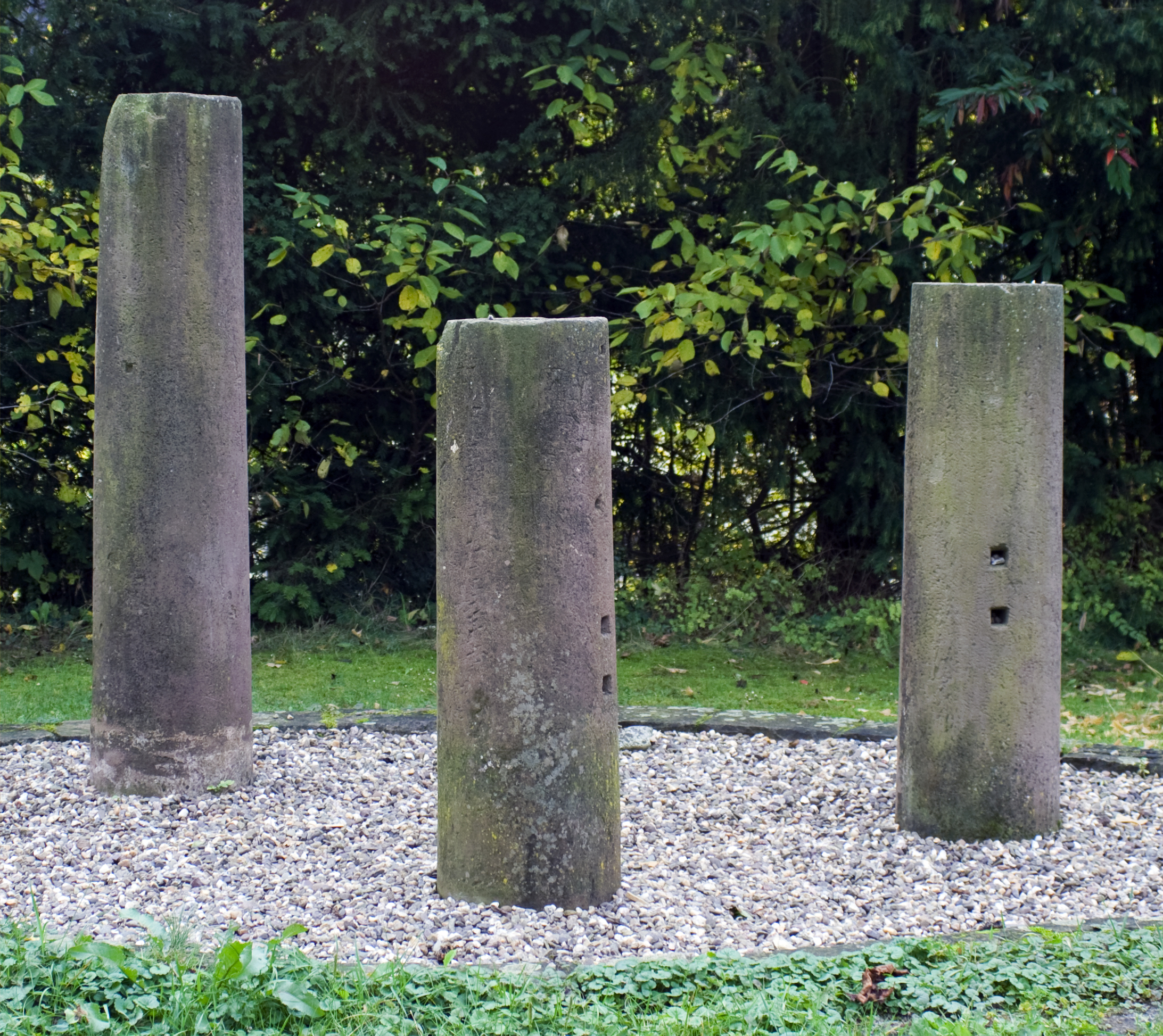
Cusanus Columns

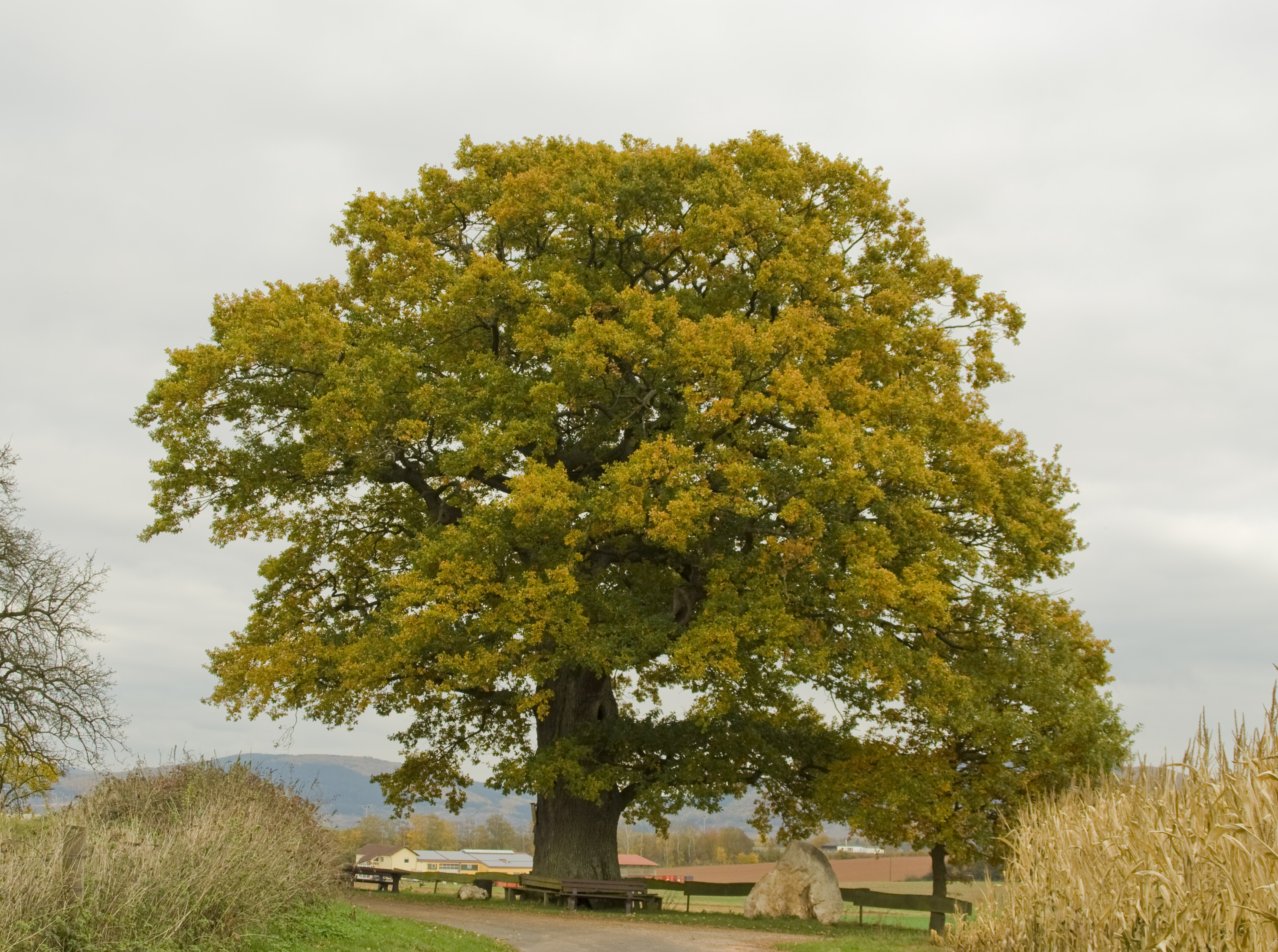
Alte Eiche (“Fat Oak”)

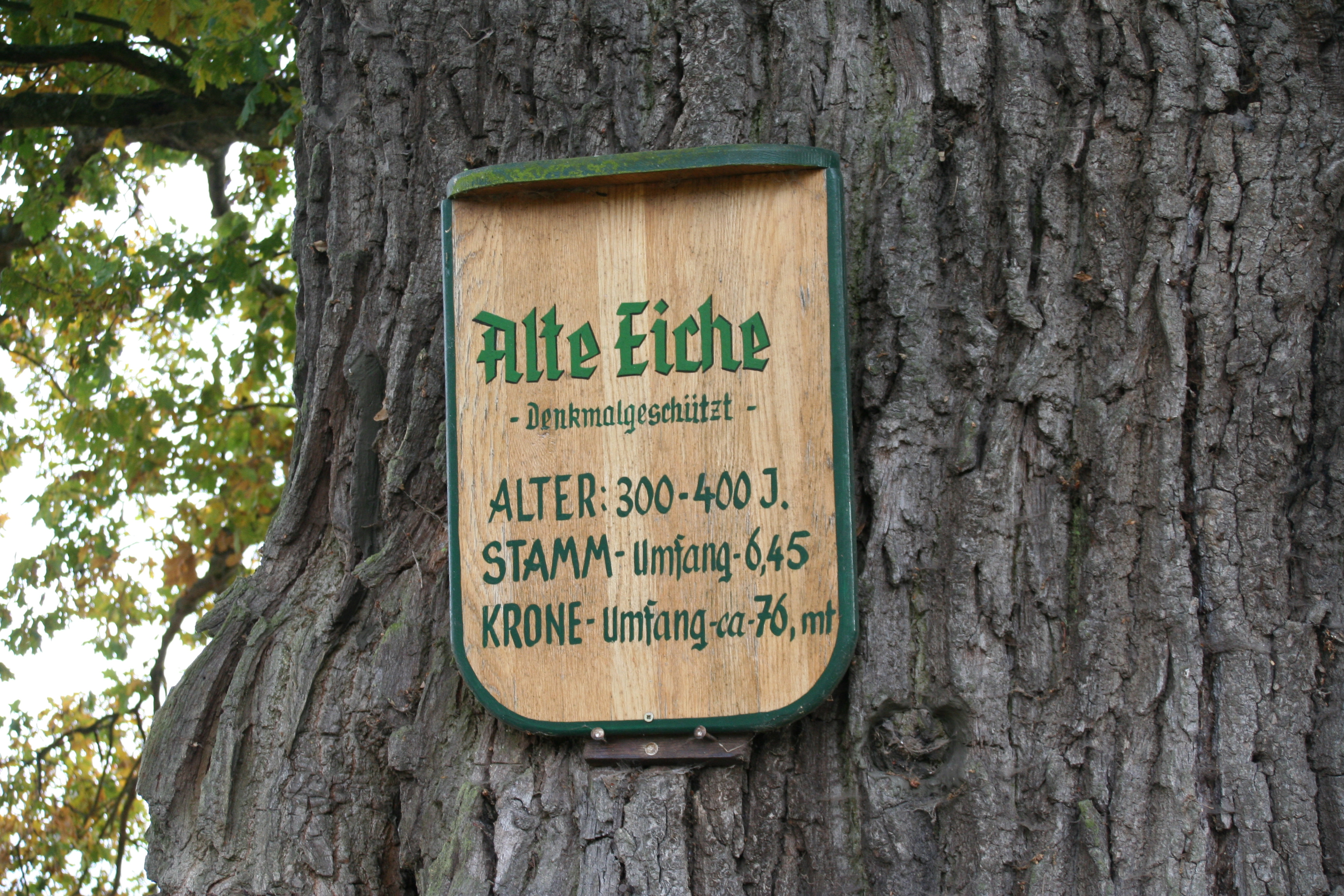
Alte Eiche (“Fat Oak”)

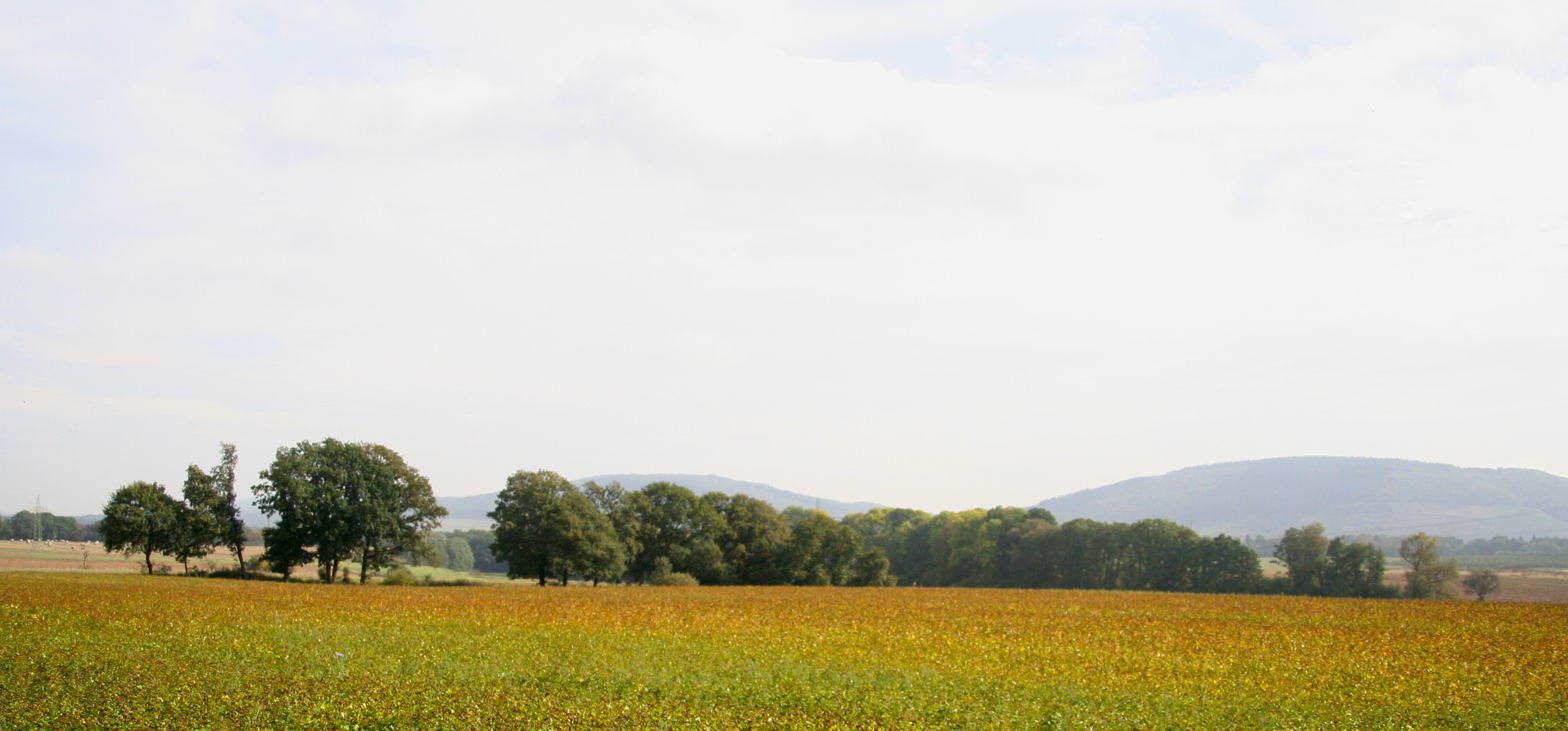
Lands around Altrich

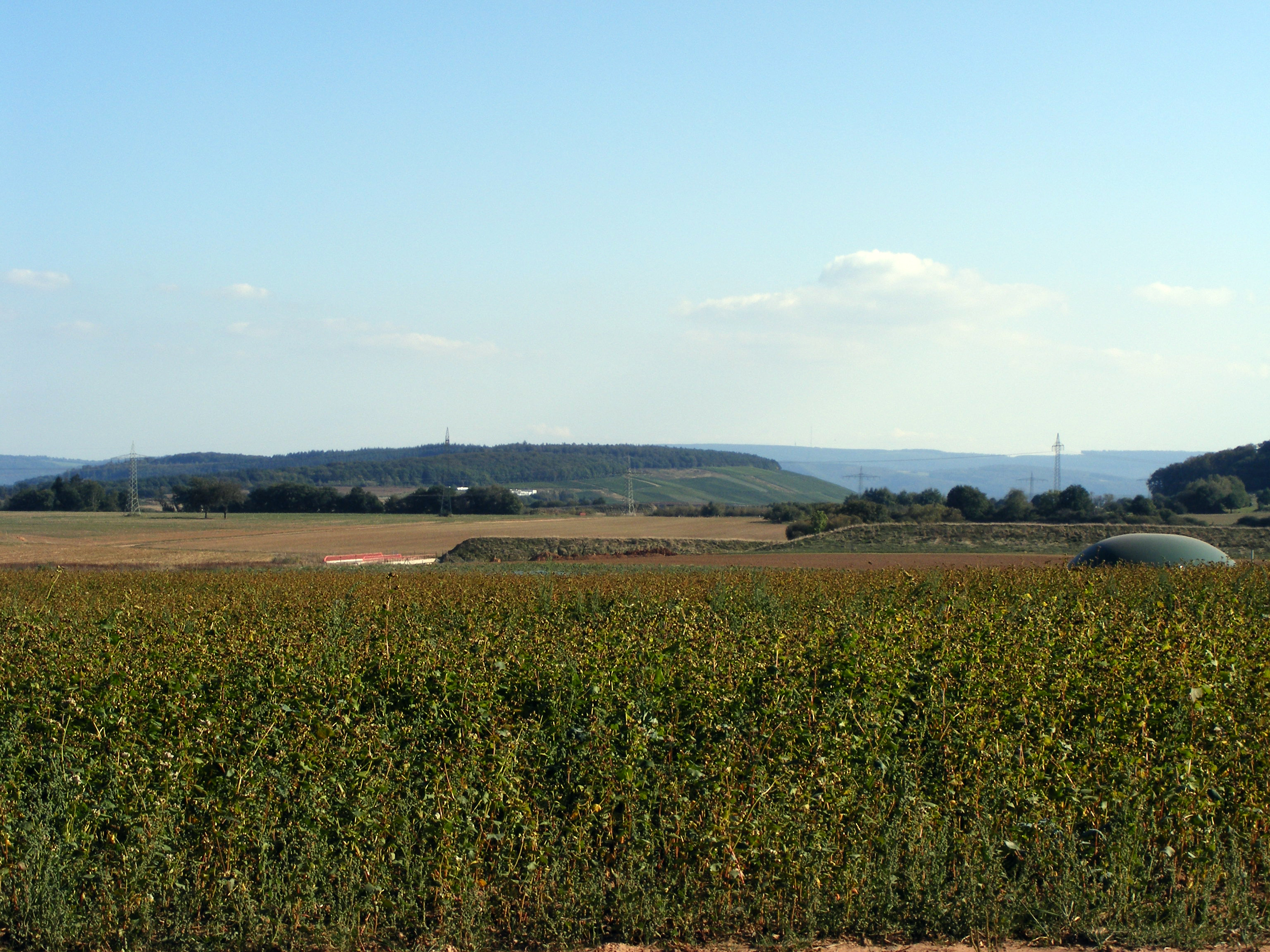
Lands around Altrich
