= Salmtal =

- Municipality
- Coat of arms

- Location of Salmtal within Bernkastel-Wittlich district
- Interactive map of Salmtal
- Location within Germany Location within Rhineland-Palatinate
- Coordinates: 49°55′40″N 06°50′54″E
- Country: Germany
- State: Rhineland-Palatinate
- District: Bernkastel-Wittlich
- Municipal assoc.: Wittlich-Land
- Subdivisions: 2

Government
  - Mayor (2019–24): Markus Peter Meyer

Area
  - Total: 14.09 km^{2} (5.44 sq mi)
- Elevation: 181 m (594 ft)

Population (2025-12-31)
  - Total: 2,523
  - Density: 179.1/km^{2} (463.8/sq mi)
- Time zone: UTC+01:00 (CET)
  - Summer (DST): UTC+02:00 (CEST)
- Postal codes: 54528
- Dialling codes: 06578
- Vehicle registration: WIL
- Website: www.salmtal.de

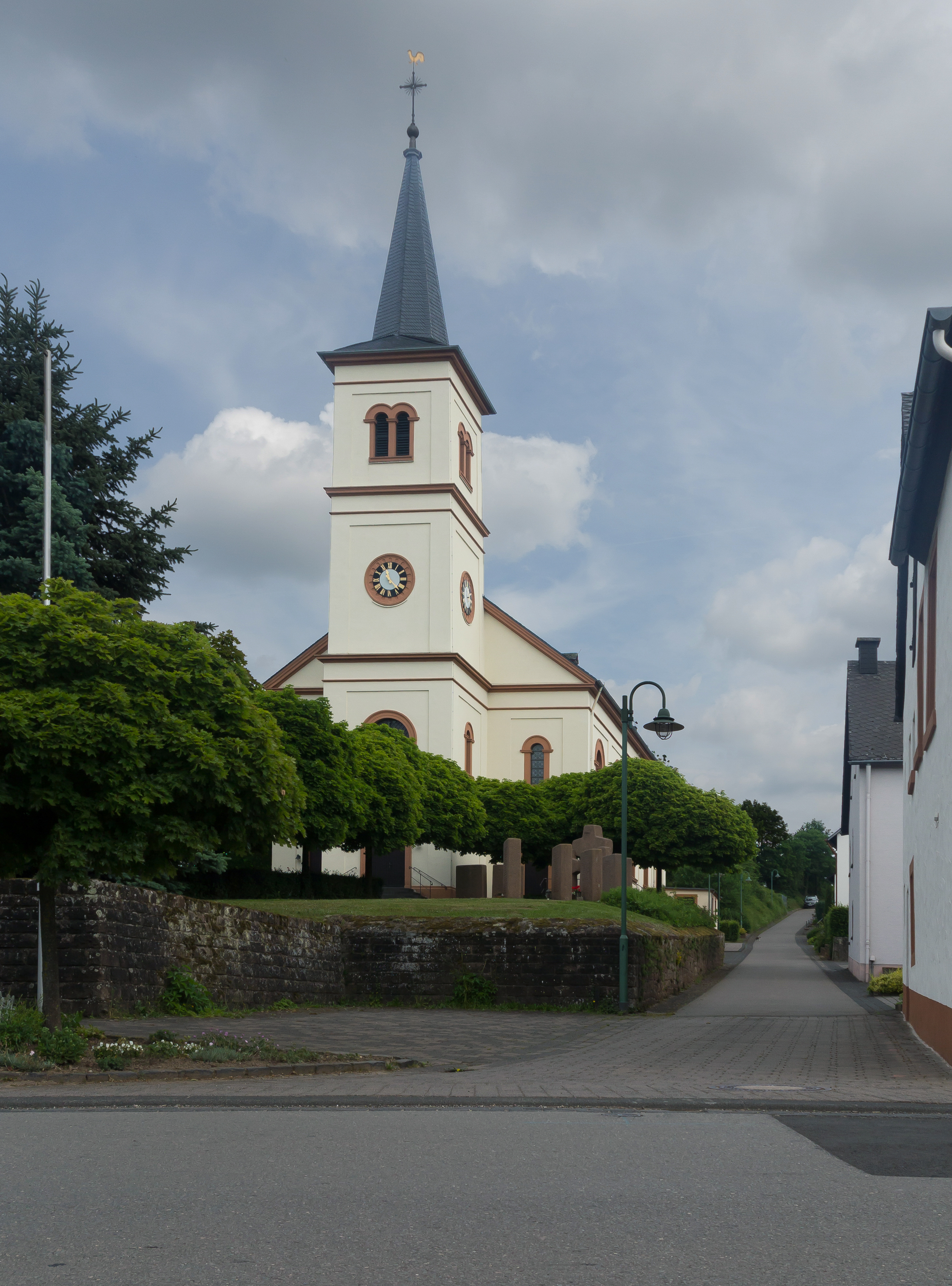
Catholic church: Pfarrkirche Sankt Martin

Salmtal is an Ortsgemeinde – a municipality belonging to a Verbandsgemeinde, a kind of collective municipality – in the Bernkastel-Wittlich district in Rhineland-Palatinate, Germany. It became well known countrywide for the football club FSV Salmrohr, who played in the Second Football Bundesliga in the 1986/1987 season.

== Geography ==
=== Location ===
The municipality lies in the Wittlich Depression in the valley of the river Salm (Salmtal in German – the municipality's namesake) on the Autobahnen A 1 and A 60, and on the Koblenz–Trier line. Salmtal belongs to the Verbandsgemeinde of Wittlich-Land, whose seat is in Wittlich, although that town is itself not in the Verbandsgemeinde.

=== Constituent communities ===
Salmtal's Ortsteile are Dörbach and Salmrohr.

== History ==
In 1007, Salmrohr had its first documentary mention as Rore bei Seleheim (compare Sehlem), and in 1250, Dörbach had its first documentary mention as Derinbach. Beginning in 1794, both Dörbach and Salmrohr lay under French rule. In 1814 they were assigned to the Kingdom of Prussia at the Congress of Vienna. From 1947, they were part of the then newly founded state of Rhineland-Palatinate. On 7 June 1969, the new municipality of Salmtal was formed out of the two former municipalities.

== Politics ==
=== Municipal council ===
The council is made up of 16 council members, who were elected by proportional representation at the municipal election held on 7 June 2009, and the honorary mayor as chairman.

The municipal election held on 7 June 2009 yielded the following results:

	FWG	CDU	WG Hower	WG Rauen	SPD	Total
2009	8	5	3	–	–	16 seats
2004	–	6	6	3	1	16 seats

=== Mayors ===
The Mayor of Salmtal is Markus Peter Meyer.

=== Coat of arms ===
The German blazon reads: Unter goldenem Schildhaupt, darin ein wachsender roter, silberbewehrter Löwe, gespaltener Schild, vorne in Silber ein blauer Anker, hinten Eisenhutfeh in Silber.

The municipality's arms might in English heraldic language be described thus: Per pale argent an anchor palewise azure and vair proper, in a chief Or a demilion gules armed of the first.

The charges are all drawn from Dörbach's and Salmrohr's history. Salmrohr and part of Dörbach were once under the lordship of the Knights of Esch, which accounts for the arms’ similarity to those borne by that municipality. However, in Salmtal's arms, the “vair” pattern (called Eisenhutfeh in German, or “iron hat fur”, a reference to the helmetlike shapes) appears only on the sinister (armsbearer's left, viewer's right) side, with an anchor charge on the dexter (armsbearer's right, viewer's left) side. This is drawn from the arms borne by Abbot Jacobus Otto of Trier, which can be seen on the gable at the Dörbacher Mühle (mill), formerly known as the estate mill of the former Klausen Augustinian Canonical Monastery.

The arms have been borne since 3 January 1980, when they were approved by the Regierungsbezirk administration.

== Culture and sightseeing ==
Salmtal has the following points of interest:

- Acidic spring in the Hexengraben (“Witch Ditch”)
- Saint Martin's Parish Church (Pfarrkirche St. Martin)
- Dörbacher Mühle (mill)
- Salmrohrer Mühle (mill)
- Saint Wendelin's Chapel (Wendelinuskapelle)
