= Klaus Toppmöller =

German footballer and manager

Personal information
- Full name: Klaus Toppmöller
- Date of birth: 12 August 1951 (age 75)
- Place of birth: Rivenich, West Germany
- Height: 1.88 m (6 ft 2 in)
- Position: Forward

Youth career
- 1960–1969: SV Rivenich

Senior career*
Years	Team	Apps	(Gls)
1969–1972	Eintracht Trier	59	(33)
1972–1980	1. FC Kaiserslautern	204	(108)
1980	Dallas Tornado	31	(7)
1981	Calgary Boomers	0	(0)
1981–1987	FSV Salmrohr	168	(114)

International career
1976–1979	West Germany	3	(1)

Managerial career
- 1987–1988: FSV Salmrohr
- 1988–1990: SSV Ulm
- 1990–1991: Wismut Aue
- 1991–1993: Waldhof Mannheim
- 1993–1994: Eintracht Frankfurt
- 1994–1999: VfL Bochum
- 1999–2000: 1. FC Saarbrücken
- 2001–2003: Bayer Leverkusen
- 2003–2004: Hamburger SV
- 2006–2008: Georgia
- * Club domestic league appearances and goals

Klaus Toppmöller (born 12 August 1951) is a German football manager and former professional player.

== Playing career ==
A forward, Toppmöller scored 108 Bundesliga goals for 1. FC Kaiserslautern in 204 matches in the West German top flight. He earned three caps and scored one goal during his international career for West Germany.

== Coaching career ==
Toppmöller became coach of FSV Salmrohr from summer 1987 to 18 April 1988 when he became coach of SSV Ulm until February 1989. After his dismissal, Toppmöller coached East German second division side Wismut Aue from 28 November 1990 to 30 June 1991. He then transferred back to the Federal league with Waldhof Mannheim from 19 September 1991 to 30 June 1993.

In light of his success, Toppmöller became coach of Eintracht Frankfurt, with whom he had a very successful start. But after failures with the squad relationship and resultantly missing the championship, he was dismissed on 10 April 1994. Toppmöller then joined VfL Bochum on 9 November 1994, with whom in the 1997–98 season reached the last sixteen of the UEFA Cup. On 30 June 1999, Toppmöller left his position as coach of VfL Bochum to become coach of 1. FC Saarbrücken, but was eventually dismissed there on 29 November 2000.

From 1 July 2001, Toppmöller was coach with Bayer Leverkusen, whom in his first season led to the UEFA Champions League final, as well as second place in Bundesliga and the DFB-Pokal final. Toppmöller was eventually declared by German sports journalists as "football coach of the year" for 2002. However, in the following season Leverkusen performed poorly, and in light of a poor league position which could have led to relegation, Toppmöller was sacked on 16 February 2003.

Toppmöller became coach of Hamburger SV on 23 October 2003. However, after the team fell to last place in the league, mostly because of his unusual tactics, formations and usage of out of position players (such as striker Sergej Barbarez in defence), he was sacked on 17 October 2004.

On 1 February 2006, Toppmöller became national coach of the Georgia national football team, with Ralf Minge as assistant coach. He was dismissed on 1 April 2008.

== Personal life ==
Toppmöller married Rosi in 1977, with whom he had Sarah-Nina, Dino (coached him at Saarbrücken) and Tommy. His brother Heinz (played together at Kaiserslautern) and nephew Marco also became footballers.

== Career statistics ==
As of 26 March 2008

Team	From	To	Record				
Team	From	To	G	W	D	L	Win %
FSV Salmrohr	1 April 1987	18 April 1988					
SSV Ulm	19 April 1988	28 February 1989					
Erzgebirge Aue	28 November 1990	30 June 1991	18	14	4	0	77.78
Waldhof Mannheim	19 September 1991	30 June 1993	71	31	23	17	43.66
Eintracht Frankfurt	1 July 1993	10 April 1994	44	23	7	14	52.27
VfL Bochum	9 November 1994	30 June 1999	175	67	38	70	38.29
1.FC Saarbrücken	1 July 1999	29 November 2000	52	28	12	12	53.85
Bayer Leverkusen	27 June 2001	16 February 2003	95	47	16	32	49.47
Hamburger SV	23 October 2003	17 October 2004	40	16	6	18	40.00
Georgia	1 January 2006	2 April 2008	25	7	4	14	28.00
Total			520	233	110	177	44.81

== Honours ==
=== As a manager ===
Bayer Leverkusen

- UEFA Champions League runner-up: 2001–02
- Bundesliga runner-up: 2001–02
- DFB-Pokal runner-up: 2001–02

Individual

- German Football Manager of the Year: 2002
