= Gollensdorf =

- Ortsteil of Zehrental
- Interactive map of Gollensdorf
- Location within Germany Location within Saxony-Anhalt
- Coordinates: 52°58′N 11°33′E
- Country: Germany
- State: Saxony-Anhalt
- District: Magdeburg
- Municipality: Zehrental

Area
  - Total: 36.31 km^{2} (14.02 sq mi)
- Elevation: 19 m (62 ft)

Population (2006-12-31)
  - Total: 302
  - Density: 8.32/km^{2} (21.5/sq mi)
- Time zone: UTC+01:00 (CET)
  - Summer (DST): UTC+02:00 (CEST)
- Postal codes: 39615
- Dialling codes: 039395
- Vehicle registration: SDL

Gollensdorf is a village and a former municipality in the district of Stendal, in Saxony-Anhalt, Germany. Since 1 January 2010, it is part of the municipality Zehrental.
