= Groß Garz =

- Ortsteil of Zehrental
- Interactive map of Groß Garz
- Location within Germany Location within Saxony-Anhalt
- Coordinates: 52°55′N 11°37′E
- Country: Germany
- State: Saxony-Anhalt
- District: Stendal
- Municipality: Zehrental

Area
  - Total: 35.99 km^{2} (13.90 sq mi)
- Elevation: 20 m (66 ft)

Population (2006-12-31)
  - Total: 772
  - Density: 21.5/km^{2} (55.6/sq mi)
- Time zone: UTC+01:00 (CET)
  - Summer (DST): UTC+02:00 (CEST)
- Postal codes: 39615
- Dialling codes: 039398
- Vehicle registration: SDL

Groß Garz is a village and a former municipality in the district of Stendal, in Saxony-Anhalt, Germany. Since 1 January 2010, it is part of the municipality Zehrental.

The villages Deutsch, Haverland, Jeggel and Lindenberg belong to Groß Garz.
