= Zemmer =

Municipality in western Germany

- Municipality
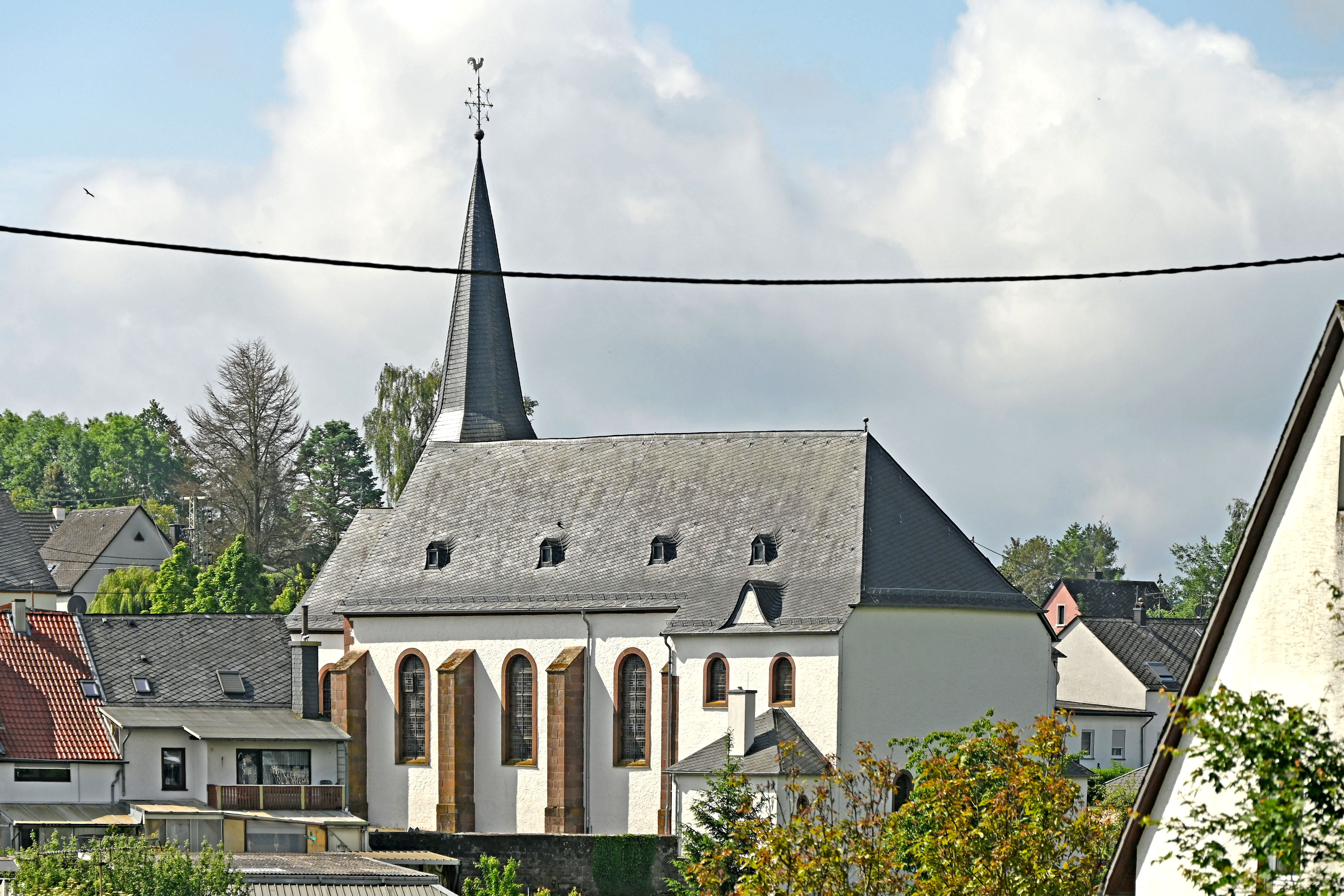

- Coat of arms

- Location of Zemmer within Trier-Saarburg district
- Interactive map of Zemmer
- Location within Germany Location within Rhineland-Palatinate
- Coordinates: 49°53′38″N 6°41′55″E
- Country: Germany
- State: Rhineland-Palatinate
- District: Trier-Saarburg
- Municipal assoc.: Trier-Land
- Subdivisions: 4 Ortsteile

Government
  - Mayor (2019–24): Edgar Schmitt

Area
  - Total: 24.38 km^{2} (9.41 sq mi)
- Elevation: 360 m (1,180 ft)

Population (2025-12-31)
  - Total: 2,913
  - Density: 119.5/km^{2} (309.5/sq mi)
- Time zone: UTC+01:00 (CET)
  - Summer (DST): UTC+02:00 (CEST)
- Postal codes: 54313
- Dialling codes: 06580
- Vehicle registration: TR
- Website: www.zemmer.de

Zemmer (German pronunciation: [ˈtsɛmɐ]) is a municipality in the Trier-Saarburg district, in Rhineland-Palatinate, Germany.
