= Friedrich Heinrich von Seckendorff =

Franconian field marshal and diplomat

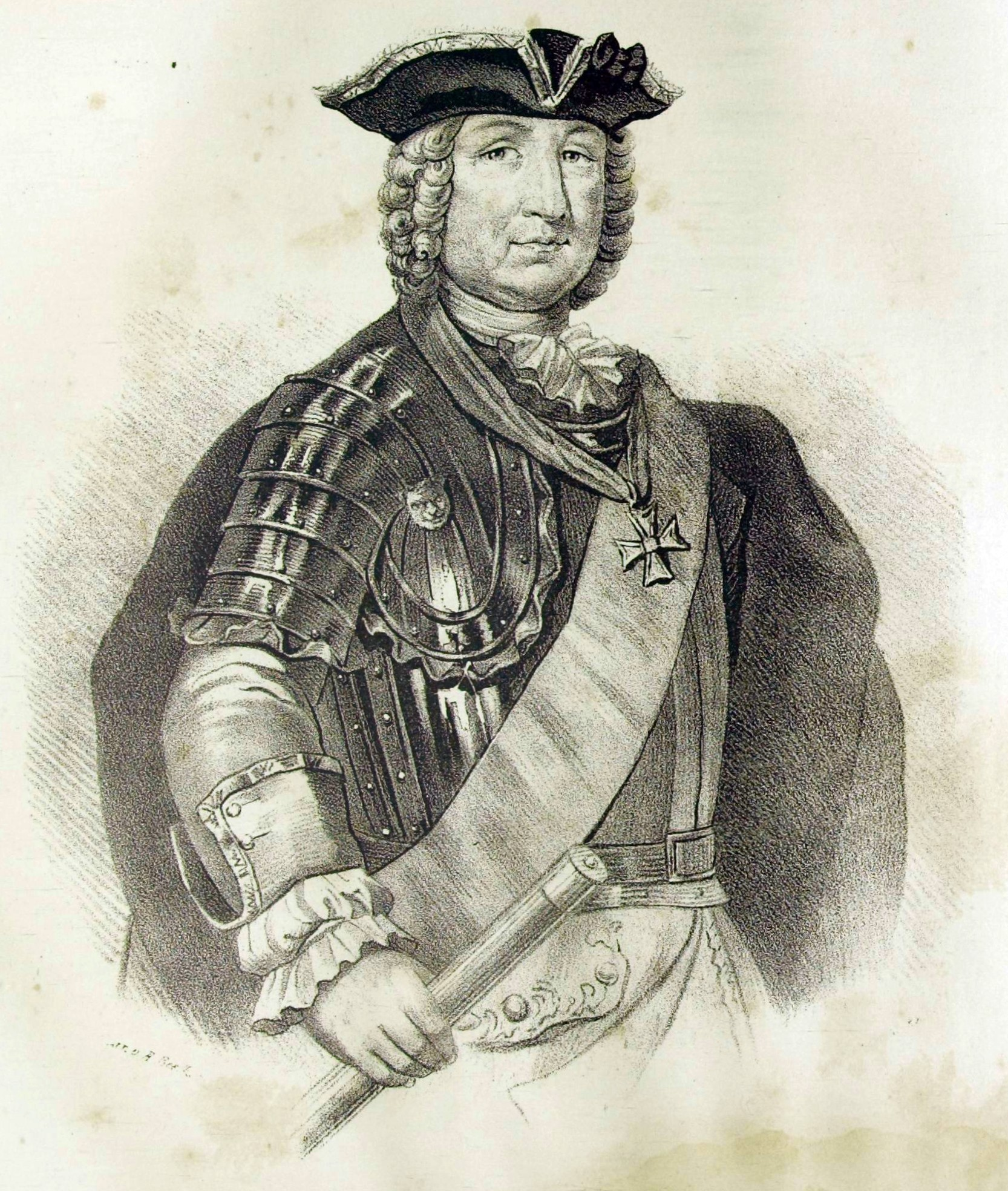
Friedrich Heinrich von Seckendorff

Friedrich Heinrich Reichsgraf von Seckendorff (5 July 1673 – 23 November 1763, aged 90) was a Franconian field marshal and diplomat, in the service of the imperial Habsburg monarchy of Austria. Later he served as commander of the Bavarian army and fought Austria.

== Family ==
Seckendorff was born in Königsberg, Franconia, into the Seckendorff family of nobility. His father was an official of Saxe-Gotha and his nephew was Veit Ludwig von Seckendorff. He studied law in Jena, Leipzig, and Leyden.

== Early military career ==
In 1693, Seckendorff served in the allied army commanded by William III of England, and in 1694 became a cornet in a Gotha cavalry regiment in Austrian pay. Leaving the cavalry, he became an infantry officer in the service of Venice, and in 1697 in that of the Margrave of Ansbach, who in 1698 transferred the regiment in which Seckendorff was serving to the Imperial army. He served under Prince Eugene of Savoy in the Great Turkish War.

In 1699, Seckendorff married and returned to Ansbach as a court officer, but the outbreak of the War of the Spanish Succession called him into the field again as lieutenant-colonel of an Ansbach regiment, which was taken into the Dutch service. During the War of the Spanish Succession, Seckendorff led Ansbach's regiment and, at the head of his dragoons, conquered 16 standards in the Battle of Blenheim. Promoted to Oberst, Seckendorff participated in the battles of Ramillies and Oudenaarde and the siege of Ryssel.

Disappointed with his lack of promotion in the Netherlands and Austria, Seckendorff entered the service of King Augustus II of Poland as a Generalmajor and commanded the king's auxiliary Saxon troops in Flanders, fighting in the siege of Tournai and the battle of Malplaquet. As the Polish envoy to the Hague, he participated in the negotiations of the 1713 Treaty of Utrecht; in the same year he suppressed an insurrection in Poland. As a lieutenant general, Seckendorff commanded Saxon troops in the 1715 siege of Stralsund against King Charles XII of Sweden.

Seckendorff reentered imperial service as a Feldmarschallleutnant in 1717. Under the command of Eugene of Savoy, Seckendorff led two Ansbach regiments against the Ottoman Turks at Belgrade. In 1718 he successfully fought against Spain in Sicily. Granted the title of Reichsgraf in 1719, Seckendorff was appointed Feldzeugmeister two years later.

== Diplomacy ==
In 1726, at the instance of Eugene of Savoy, Seckendorff became the imperial ambassador at the Prussian court in Berlin. He gained the trust of King Frederick William I of Prussia; king and diplomat had fought alongside one another in the War of the Spanish Succession. Seckendorff also bribed the minister of state, the influential Friedrich Wilhelm von Grumbkow, with an Austrian pension. In order to avoid a potential marriage between Crown Prince Frederick and a princess of the House of Hanover that would have allied Prussia and Great Britain, Seckendorff manipulated Frederick William and his son so that the crown prince instead married Elizabeth Christina of Brunswick-Bevern, a marriage more favorable to Austria.

Seckendorff's diplomatic skill also led to recognition of the Pragmatic Sanction by the courts of numerous German principalities, Denmark, and the Dutch Republic.

== Later military career ==
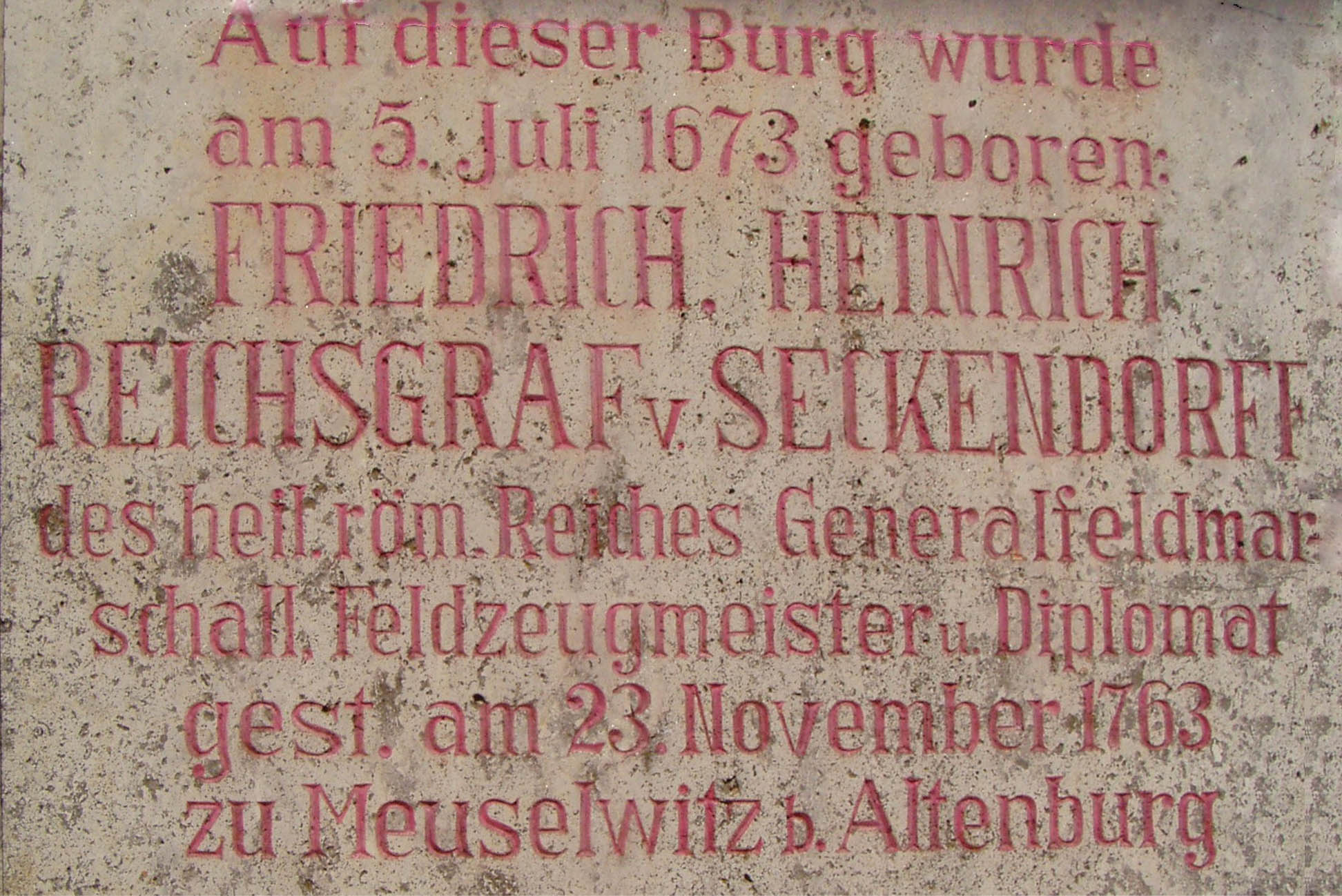
Seckendorff memorial at the castle of Königsberg.

In 1734, Seckendorff returned to the imperial army and became Governor of Mainz. As imperial general of cavalry during the War of the Polish Succession, he led 30,000 troops against the French at Clausen on 20 October 1735. In 1737, Emperor Charles VI made Seckendorff commander-in-chief in Hungary, at the same time giving him the baton of Feldmarschall. Although initially successful in the Austrian-Russian campaign against the Ottomans, he was eventually forced to retreat across the Save River. His numerous enemies in Vienna brought about his recall, trial and imprisonment at Graz as punishment for the unsuccessful war.

Empress Maria Theresa released Seckendorff from prison in 1740, but, denied his arrears of pay, he laid down all his Austrian and imperial offices and accepted from the new Holy Roman emperor, Bavarian Charles VII, the rank of field marshal in the Bavarian service. As commander of the Bavarian army, Seckendorff relieved Munich in the War of the Austrian Succession and, by a series of battles in 1743 and 1744, forced the Austrians back into Bohemia, after which he resigned.

Following the death of Charles VII, Seckendorff negotiated a reconciliation between Austria and Bavaria in the Treaty of Füssen on 22 April 1745. Emperor Francis I reaffirmed all of Seckendorff's honors, and the diplomat retired to his estate at Meuselwitz in Thuringia. In 1757 the death of his wife, for whom, harsh and unamiable as he was, he had a deep and abiding affection, broke down his already failing health. Frederick the Great directed Prussian hussars to abduct Seckendorff from Meuselwitz in December 1758 during the Seven Years' War. After spending half a year in detention in Magdeburg, he was exchanged for Moritz of Anhalt-Dessau, who had been captured by Austrians at Hochkirch. Returning to Meuselwitz, Seckendorff died at his estate in 1763.

== Quotes ==
Frederick the Great despised Seckendorff, resenting the military diplomat for gaining the trust of Frederick William I and his involvement in the Prussian wedding plans. Regarding Seckendorff, Frederick wrote, "He was sordidly scheming; his manners were crude and rustic; lying had become so much second nature to him that he had lost the use of the truth. He was a usurer who sometimes appeared in the guise of a soldier, and sometimes in that of a diplomat".

== Notes ==
Attribution:
