= Zehrental =

- Municipality
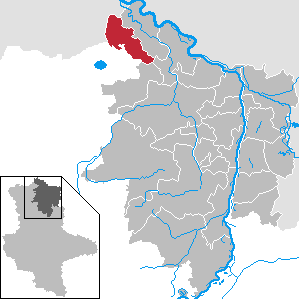
- Location of Zehrental within Stendal district
- Interactive map of Zehrental
- Location within Germany Location within Saxony-Anhalt
- Coordinates: 52°57′N 11°35′E
- Country: Germany
- State: Saxony-Anhalt
- District: Stendal
- Municipal assoc.: Seehausen

Government
  - Mayor (2021–28): Michael Seide

Area
  - Total: 72.32 km^{2} (27.92 sq mi)
- Elevation: 20 m (66 ft)

Population (2025-12-31)
  - Total: 775
  - Density: 10.7/km^{2} (27.8/sq mi)
- Time zone: UTC+01:00 (CET)
  - Summer (DST): UTC+02:00 (CEST)
- Postal codes: 39615
- Dialling codes: 039395, 039398
- Vehicle registration: SDL

Zehrental (German pronunciation: [ˈtseːʁənˌtaːl]) is a municipality in the district of Stendal, in Saxony-Anhalt, Germany. It was formed on 1 January 2010, by the merger of the former municipalities Gollensdorf and Groß Garz.
