= Heidweiler =

- Municipality
- Coat of arms

- Location of Heidweiler within Bernkastel-Wittlich district
- Interactive map of Heidweiler
- Location within Germany Location within Rhineland-Palatinate
- Coordinates: 49°54′40″N 6°44′47″E
- Country: Germany
- State: Rhineland-Palatinate
- District: Bernkastel-Wittlich
- Municipal assoc.: Wittlich-Land

Government
  - Mayor (2019–24): Hans Josef Götten

Area
  - Total: 10.33 km^{2} (3.99 sq mi)
- Elevation: 295 m (968 ft)

Population (2025-12-31)
  - Total: 167
  - Density: 16.2/km^{2} (41.9/sq mi)
- Time zone: UTC+01:00 (CET)
  - Summer (DST): UTC+02:00 (CEST)
- Postal codes: 54518
- Dialling codes: 06508, 06580
- Vehicle registration: WIL

Heidweiler (German pronunciation: [ˈhaɪtvaɪlɐ]) is an Ortsgemeinde – a municipality belonging to a Verbandsgemeinde, a kind of collective municipality – in the Bernkastel-Wittlich district in Rhineland-Palatinate, Germany.

== Geography ==
Heidweiler belongs to the Verbandsgemeinde of Wittlich-Land, whose seat is in Wittlich, although that town is itself not in the Verbandsgemeinde.

== History ==
In the 14th century, Heidweiler had its first documentary mention as Heidwyler. Beginning in 1794, Heidweiler lay under French rule. In 1814 it was assigned to the Kingdom of Prussia at the Congress of Vienna. Since 1946, it has been part of the then newly founded state of Rhineland-Palatinate.

== Politics ==
=== Municipal council ===
The council is made up of 6 council members, who were elected by majority vote at the municipal election held on 7 June 2009, and the honorary mayor as chairman.

=== Coat of arms ===
The German blazon reads: Schild gespalten, vorn in Grün silberner Rost, hinten in Silber zwei rote Pfähle.

The municipality's arms might in English heraldic language be described thus: Per pale vert a gridiron argent, the handle to dexter chief, and argent two pallets gules.

== Culture and sightseeing ==
- Saint Vincent's Parish Church (Pfarrkirche St. Vinzentius)
- Old rectory
- Heiligenhäuschen (a shrinelike structure)
- Bildchen (image of Mary)
- Root vegetable washing place
- Washing spring
- Old Heidweiler Mill (Alte Mühle Heidweiler)
- Biogas complex
- Dierscheid lookout tower
