= Heckenmünster =

- Municipality
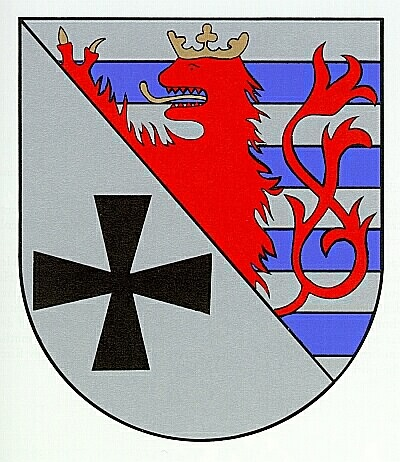
- Coat of arms

- Location of Heckenmünster within Bernkastel-Wittlich district
- Interactive map of Heckenmünster
- Location within Germany Location within Rhineland-Palatinate
- Coordinates: 49°54′33″N 6°47′16″E
- Country: Germany
- State: Rhineland-Palatinate
- District: Bernkastel-Wittlich
- Municipal assoc.: Wittlich-Land

Government
  - Mayor (2019–24): Ruth Friedrich

Area
  - Total: 4.88 km^{2} (1.88 sq mi)
- Elevation: 230 m (750 ft)

Population (2025-12-31)
  - Total: 133
  - Density: 27.3/km^{2} (70.6/sq mi)
- Time zone: UTC+01:00 (CET)
  - Summer (DST): UTC+02:00 (CEST)
- Postal codes: 54518
- Dialling codes: 06508
- Vehicle registration: WIL
- Website: www.heckenmuenster.com

Heckenmünster is an Ortsgemeinde – a municipality belonging to a Verbandsgemeinde, a kind of collective municipality – in the Bernkastel-Wittlich district in Rhineland-Palatinate, Germany.

== Geography ==
The municipality lies on the Meulenwald hill range in the Eifel and belongs to the Verbandsgemeinde of Wittlich-Land, whose seat is in Wittlich, although that town is itself not in the Verbandsgemeinde.

== History ==
About 1231, Heckenmünster had its first documentary mention as villam, que Monasterium appellatur (“village that is called Monastery”). The village belonged to the Duchy of Luxembourg and lay on the border with the Electorate of Trier. Until the 18th century, only a few homesteads here were actually occupied. The Parish Church of the Holy Cross (Pfarrkirche zum Heiligen Kreuz, built in 1744) was the destination for many pilgrims locally.

Beginning in 1794, Heckenmünster lay under French rule. In 1814 it was assigned to the Kingdom of Prussia at the Congress of Vienna. Since 1947, it has been part of the then newly founded state of Rhineland-Palatinate.

== Politics ==
=== Municipal council ===
The council is made up of 6 council members, who were elected by majority vote at the municipal election held on 7 June 2009, and the honorary mayor as chairman.

=== Coat of arms ===
The German blazon reads: Im schräggeteilten Schild vorne in Silber ein schwarzes Tatzenkreuz, hinten in Silber 4 blaue Balken, belegt mit einem roten, goldgekrönten, wachsenden Löwen.

The municipality's arms might in English heraldic language be described thus: Per bend argent a cross pattée sable, and argent four bars azure charged of a demi-lion rampant issuant from the line of partition gules crowned Or.

== Mineral springs ==
Near Heckenmünster are two springs containing carbonic acid (H_{2}CO_{3}), sometimes called Säuerlinge for their sour taste: the Viktoria-Quelle and a sulphur spring called Wallenborn (not to be confused with the Wallender Born, lying some 25 km away). The Romans used the springs for baths, and the water from the Viktoria-Quelle was once bottled and sold. Today, both springs are encased to form fountains, but neither is used commercially anymore. In the valley of the Bendersbach high above Heckenmünster is yet another mineral spring with a high mineral and carbonic acid content, but with quite a low delivery.
