= Dierscheid =

- Municipality
- Coat of arms

- Location of Dierscheid within Bernkastel-Wittlich district
- Interactive map of Dierscheid
- Location within Germany Location within Rhineland-Palatinate
- Coordinates: 49°54′N 06°46′E
- Country: Germany
- State: Rhineland-Palatinate
- District: Bernkastel-Wittlich
- Municipal assoc.: Wittlich-Land

Government
  - Mayor (2019–24): Dirk Laudwein

Area
  - Total: 2.42 km^{2} (0.93 sq mi)
- Elevation: 400 m (1,300 ft)

Population (2025-12-31)
  - Total: 167
  - Density: 69.0/km^{2} (179/sq mi)
- Time zone: UTC+01:00 (CET)
  - Summer (DST): UTC+02:00 (CEST)
- Postal codes: 54523
- Dialling codes: 06508
- Vehicle registration: WIL
- Website: www.og-dierscheid.de

Dierscheid is an Ortsgemeinde – a municipality belonging to a Verbandsgemeinde, a kind of collective municipality – in the Bernkastel-Wittlich district in Rhineland-Palatinate, Germany.

== Geography ==
The municipality lies in the wooded Meulenwald hill range, southwest of Wittlich at an elevation of some 400 m above sea level. Near Dierscheid lies the Kellerberg, at 448 m the highest mountain in the Verbandsgemeinde of Wittlich-Land, to which Dierscheid belongs, and whose seat is in Wittlich, although that town is itself not in the Verbandsgemeinde.

== History ==
Early settlement is witnessed by remnants of a Roman wall. Some of the finds to this effect are displayed in the local history museum.

In 1150, Dierscheid had its first documentary mention in a document from St. Maximin's Abbey in Trier. In the 13th century, the village had the name Dyrseit. The Lords of Bruch held the tithing rights in the parish of Heidweiler, to which the branch parish of Dierscheid also belonged. In January 1417, the name changed to Diescheit. The spelling for the placename changed very often: Dierscheid, Dierschet, Dischet, Dirscheit, Dierscheydt, Dierscheit, Dyrseit and Derseit.

Dierscheid belonged to the lordship of Bruch, and therefore lay under Luxembourgish sovereignty. Beginning in 1794, Dierscheid lay under French rule. In 1814 it was assigned to the Kingdom of Prussia at the Congress of Vienna. Since 1946, it has been part of the then newly founded state of Rhineland-Palatinate.

Dierscheid was until the 1950s characterized by agriculture, forestry and gravel mining. The villagers are still known today well beyond the village by the name Dierscheider Kieselklopper (“Dierscheid Gravel Miners”).

== Politics ==
=== Municipal council ===
The council is made up of 6 council members, who were elected by majority vote at the municipal election held on 7 June 2009, and the honorary mayor as chairman.

=== Coat of arms ===
The German blazon reads: In Silber auf rotem Dreiberg, darin eine goldene Hirschstange, drei grüne Fichten mit goldenen Zapfen.

The municipality's arms might in English heraldic language be described thus: Argent in base a mount of three gules surmounted by a stag's attire fesswise Or, on each of the mount's knolls a spruce tree vert, the middle one taller, and each surmounted by six cones of the third, one, two and three.

These arms are held to be canting as they imply the placename and even the geographical location. The name Dierscheid means “Deer-Wild” (the word Dier does not seem to be used anymore in German, Reh and Hirsch being the usual words, but it is an obvious cognate with the still current English word), hence the antler (or “attire” in heraldic language) and the spruces. The three-knolled hill in the escutcheon’s base symbolizes the municipality's location in mountain heights in the Voreifel. The tinctures argent and gules (silver and red) are a reference to the village's former allegiance to the Electorate of Trier.

== Culture and sightseeing ==
- Kellerberg, the highest elevation in the South Eifel.
- Village archive and local history museum, housed in a former wheelwright's workshop from about 1900
- Saint Lawrence's Chapel (Laurentiuskapelle) from 1796, built on top of another chapel from 1745 that had burnt down
