= Counts of Kesselstatt =

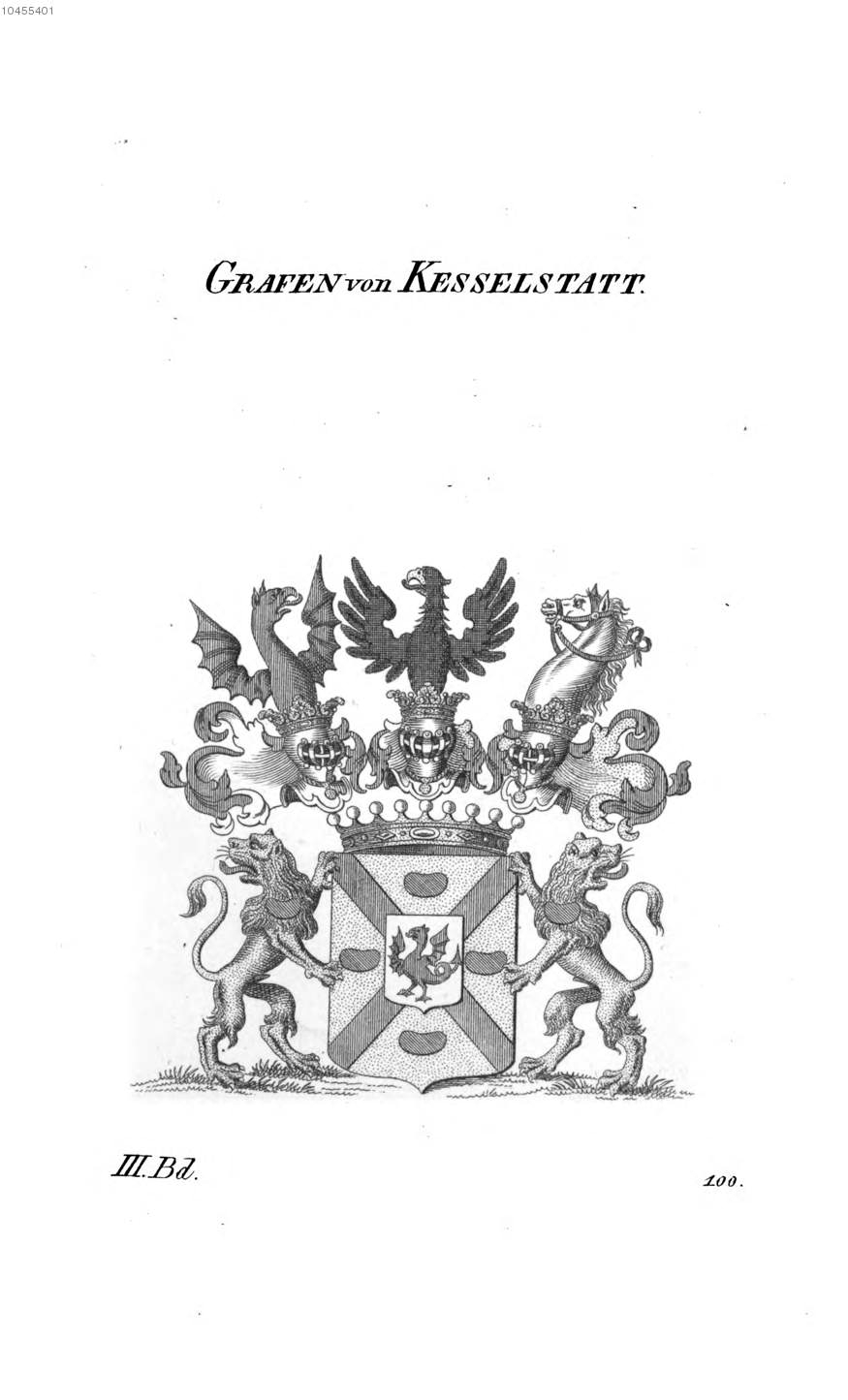
Arms of the Counts of Kesselstatt

Emperor Josef II elevated the Reichsfreiherren (Imperial Barons) of Keselstatt to the status of Reichsgrafen (Imperial Counts) in 1776. The title of Count of Kesselstatt (German: Graf von Kesselstatt) is accompanied by the style of His Excellency; wives and daughters of Counts of Kesselstatt would be "Her Excellency Countess Forename of Kesselstatt". They are cousins of the Princely Family of Liechtenstein.

The family's historic seat was Kesselstatt Palace in Trier, Germany. The palace was completed for Count Karl Friedrich Melchior in 1746. At the beginning of the 20th century, part of the Kesselstatt family settled in Argentina.

== Family members ==
- Johann Hugo Casimir Graf von Kesselstatt was the highest official in Trier, chief administrator of Elector Clemens Wenceslaus of Saxony from 1761 through 1794
- Franz Joseph – b. 27 Feb 1826 Wien, Austria, d. 4 Jan 1891 Abbazia
- Eugen – b. 10 Jun 1870 Gleichenberg, d. 10 Nov 1933 Grundlsee, Steiermark, Austria
- Franz de Paul – 1894–1938
- Johannes – born on 21 May 1927
- Franz Eugen – born on 1 May 1926
- Rudolf – born on 31 January 1956
- Ferdinand – born on 8 March 1989
- Alexander – born on 13 May 1991
- Georg – born on 31 January 1956
- Clemens – born on 7 June 1959
- Franz – born on 26 May 1961
- Theresa Marielle Aiga Diana Maria – born on 15 July 1999 Wiesbaden, Germany

== Counts of Kesselstatt – Argentine Line ==
- Clemens – 1899–1938
- Georg – 1905–1990
- Otto – 1928–1984
- Federico – born on 9 April 1964
- Guillermo – born on 5 May 1965
- Maximiliano – born on 9 November 1966
- Roberto – born on 21 January 1968
- Conrado – born on 7 August 1972
- Diego – born on 20 October 1973
- Matias – born on 22 February 1975
