= Kellerberg (Forchheim) =

Mountain in Germany

Coordinates: 49°43′46″N 11°4′30″E

Highest point
- Elevation: 340 m (1,120 ft)

Geography
- Location: Bavaria, Germany

Kellerberg (Forchheim) is a mountain of Bavaria, Germany.
