= Esch, Bernkastel-Wittlich =

Esch
- Municipality
- Coat of arms

- Location of Esch within Bernkastel-Wittlich district
- Interactive map of Esch
- Location within Germany Location within Rhineland-Palatinate
- Coordinates: 49°53′53″N 6°51′01″E
- Country: Germany
- State: Rhineland-Palatinate
- District: Bernkastel-Wittlich
- Municipal assoc.: Wittlich-Land

Government
  - Mayor (2019–24): Uwe Ruhnau

Area
  - Total: 2.29 km^{2} (0.88 sq mi)
- Elevation: 150 m (490 ft)

Population (2025-12-31)
  - Total: 426
  - Density: 186/km^{2} (482/sq mi)
- Time zone: UTC+01:00 (CET)
  - Summer (DST): UTC+02:00 (CEST)
- Postal codes: 54518
- Dialling codes: 06508
- Vehicle registration: WIL

Esch (German pronunciation: [ɛʃ]) is an Ortsgemeinde – a municipality belonging to a Verbandsgemeinde, a kind of collective municipality – in the Bernkastel-Wittlich district in Rhineland-Palatinate, Germany.

== Geography ==
The municipality lies in the southern Salm valley at the edge of the Moselle Mountains. It belongs to the Verbandsgemeinde of Wittlich-Land, whose seat is in Wittlich, although that town is itself not in the Verbandsgemeinde.

== History ==
In 1086, Esch had its first documented mention under the name Asche. In the 15th century, Esch was the residential seat of the Blessed Eberhard, who founded the pilgrimage village of Klausen. Beginning in 1794, Esch lay under French rule. In 1814 it was assigned to the Kingdom of Prussia at the Congress of Vienna. Since 1947, it has been part of the then newly founded state of Rhineland-Palatinate.

== Politics ==
=== Municipal council ===
The council is made up of 8 council members, who were elected by proportional representation at the municipal election held on 7 June 2009, and the honorary mayor as chairman.

The municipal election held on 7 June 2009 yielded the following results:

| Year | FBL | FWG | Total |
|---|---|---|---|
| 2009 | 5 | 3 | 8 seats |
| 2004 | 6 | 2 | 8 seats |

=== Coat of arms ===
The German blazon reads: unter goldenem Schildhaupt einen wachsenden roten Löwen mit silber-blauer Eisenhutfeh

The municipality's arms might in English heraldic language be described thus: Vair proper, in a chief Or a demilion gules.
