= Rivenich =

- Municipality
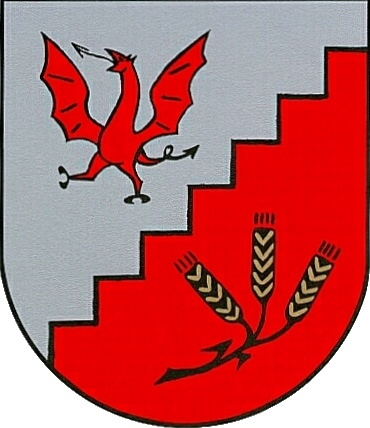
- Coat of arms

- Location of Rivenich within Bernkastel-Wittlich district
- Interactive map of Rivenich
- Location within Germany Location within Rhineland-Palatinate
- Coordinates: 49°52′39″N 6°50′46″E
- Country: Germany
- State: Rhineland-Palatinate
- District: Bernkastel-Wittlich
- Municipal assoc.: Wittlich-Land

Government
  - Mayor (2019–24): Peter Knops

Area
  - Total: 7.78 km^{2} (3.00 sq mi)
- Elevation: 140 m (460 ft)

Population (2025-12-31)
  - Total: 728
  - Density: 93.6/km^{2} (242/sq mi)
- Time zone: UTC+01:00 (CET)
  - Summer (DST): UTC+02:00 (CEST)
- Postal codes: 54518
- Dialling codes: 06508
- Vehicle registration: WIL
- Website: www.rivenich.de

Rivenich is an Ortsgemeinde – a municipality belonging to a Verbandsgemeinde, a kind of collective municipality – in the Bernkastel-Wittlich district in Rhineland-Palatinate, Germany.

== Geography ==
The municipality lies in the Eifel on the river Salm. The municipal area is 33% wooded. The nearest city is Trier, some 24 km away to the southwest. Rivenich belongs to the Verbandsgemeinde of Wittlich-Land, whose seat is in Wittlich, although that town is itself not in the Verbandsgemeinde.

== History ==
In 748, Rivenich had its first documentary mention as Riveniacus. After the French Revolution, the village became part of the Department of Sarre. In 1814 it was assigned to the Kingdom of Prussia at the Congress of Vienna. Since 1947, it has been part of the then newly founded state of Rhineland-Palatinate.

== Politics ==
=== Municipal council ===
The council is made up of 12 council members, who were elected by proportional representation at the municipal election held on 7 June 2009, and the honorary mayor as chairman.

The municipal election held on 7 June 2009 yielded the following results:

Year	SPD	FWG	Total
2009	7	5	12 seats
2004	5	7	12 seats

=== Coat of arms ===
The German blazon reads: Schild schräglinks stufenförmig geteilt, vorne in Silber ein roter Drache, hinten in Rot drei goldene Ähren.

The municipality's arms might in English heraldic language be described thus: Per bend sinister indented, argent a dragon segreant gules and gules three ears of wheat conjoined on one stem slipped Or.

Written history records that on 30 December 1704, Count Hugo Ernst Cratz von Scharfenstein donated all his rights to the villages of Rivenich and Erlenbach to Baron Karl Kaspar von Kesselstatt, Provost of the Trier Monastery of St. Paulin. With the family von Kesselstatt's approval, the charge borne by the former barons (later Imperial counts) appears on the dexter (armsbearer's right, viewer's left) side. The step-shaped division of the field recalls the “fess dancetty” (horizontal zigzag stripe) formerly borne as an heraldic device by the Lords of Manderscheid, and thereby also Rivenich's time under the Manderscheid-Bruch high court. Likewise, the charge on the sinister (armsbearer's left, viewer's right) side recalls a composition once seen on a court seal (from 1765). These three ears of wheat stand for the parish's patron saint, Brice of Tours.

Rivenich was granted the right to bear its own arms in 1975 by the Regierungsbezirk administration.

== Economy and infrastructure ==
Northwest of Rivenich runs the Autobahn A 1. In nearby Hetzerath is a railway station on the Koblenz-Trier railway line.

== Famous people ==
- Günter Rösch (b. 1943), politician
- Klaus Toppmöller (b. 1951), footballer, football trainer and municipal councillor (SPD)
- Dino Toppmöller (b. 1980), footballer, Klaus Toppmöller's son
