= Sehlem, Rhineland-Palatinate =

Sehlem
- Municipality
- Coat of arms

- Location of Sehlem within Bernkastel-Wittlich district
- Interactive map of Sehlem
- Location within Germany Location within Rhineland-Palatinate
- Coordinates: 49°54′13″N 6°50′17″E
- Country: Germany
- State: Rhineland-Palatinate
- District: Bernkastel-Wittlich
- Municipal assoc.: Wittlich-Land

Government
  - Mayor (2019–24): Gregor Zehe

Area
  - Total: 11.25 km^{2} (4.34 sq mi)
- Elevation: 160 m (520 ft)

Population (2025-12-31)
  - Total: 1,021
  - Density: 90.76/km^{2} (235.1/sq mi)
- Time zone: UTC+01:00 (CET)
  - Summer (DST): UTC+02:00 (CEST)
- Postal codes: 54518
- Dialling codes: 06508
- Vehicle registration: WIL

Sehlem is an Ortsgemeinde – a municipality belonging to a Verbandsgemeinde, a kind of collective municipality – in the Bernkastel-Wittlich district in Rhineland-Palatinate, Germany.

== Geography ==
=== Location ===
The municipality lies in the Eifel and belongs to the Verbandsgemeinde of Wittlich-Land, whose seat is in Wittlich, although that town is itself not in the Verbandsgemeinde.

== History ==
Sehlem was part of the Electorate of Trier. Beginning in 1794, Sehlem lay under French rule. In 1814 it was assigned to the Kingdom of Prussia at the Congress of Vienna. Since 1947, it has been part of the then newly founded state of Rhineland-Palatinate.

== Politics ==
=== Municipal council ===
The council is made up of 12 council members, who were elected by proportional representation at the municipal election held on 7 June 2009, and the honorary mayor as chairman.

The municipal election held on 7 June 2009 yielded the following results:

Year	WG Mehrfeld	WG Molitor	WG Lehnen	WG Zehe	Total
2009	5	2	4	1	12 seats

=== Mayors ===
The mayor of Sehlem is Gregor Zehe.

=== Coat of arms ===
The German blazon reads: Über grünem Schildfuß, darin zwei silberne Leisten, in Silber ein rotes Balkenkreuz, belegt mit grünem sechsspeichigem Rad.

The municipality's arms might in English heraldic language be described thus: Argent a cross gules, surmounting the whole a wheel spoked of six vert, in a base of the third two bars of the first.

== Economy and infrastructure ==
=== Transport ===
Sehlem lies on the Autobahn A 1 and has at its disposal a railway station on the Koblenz-Trier line.
