= Föhren =

- Municipality
- Coat of arms

- Location of Föhren within Trier-Saarburg district
- Interactive map of Föhren
- Location within Germany Location within Rhineland-Palatinate
- Coordinates: 49°51′29″N 6°46′1″E
- Country: Germany
- State: Rhineland-Palatinate
- District: Trier-Saarburg
- Municipal assoc.: Schweich an der Römischen Weinstraße

Government
  - Mayor (2019–24): Rosi Radant (CDU)

Area
  - Total: 9.79 km^{2} (3.78 sq mi)
- Elevation: 205 m (673 ft)

Population (2025-12-31)
  - Total: 3,041
  - Density: 311/km^{2} (805/sq mi)
- Time zone: UTC+01:00 (CET)
  - Summer (DST): UTC+02:00 (CEST)
- Postal codes: 54343
- Dialling codes: 06502
- Vehicle registration: TR, SAB
- Website: gemeinde-foehren.de

Föhren is a municipality in the Trier-Saarburg district, in Rhineland-Palatinate, Germany.
