= Hetzerath =

- Municipality
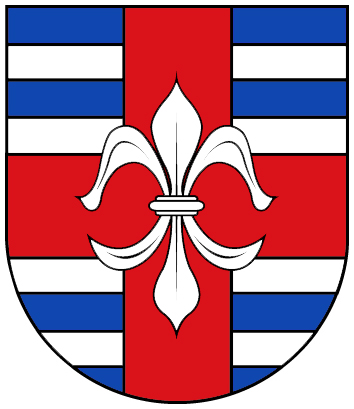
- Coat of arms

- Location of Hetzerath within Bernkastel-Wittlich district
- Interactive map of Hetzerath
- Location within Germany Location within Rhineland-Palatinate
- Coordinates: 49°52′42″N 6°48′51″E
- Country: Germany
- State: Rhineland-Palatinate
- District: Bernkastel-Wittlich
- Municipal assoc.: Wittlich-Land

Government
  - Mayor (2019–24): Werner Monzel

Area
  - Total: 13.87 km^{2} (5.36 sq mi)
- Elevation: 180 m (590 ft)

Population (2025-12-31)
  - Total: 2,594
  - Density: 187.0/km^{2} (484.4/sq mi)
- Time zone: UTC+01:00 (CET)
  - Summer (DST): UTC+02:00 (CEST)
- Postal codes: 54523
- Dialling codes: 06508
- Vehicle registration: WIL

Hetzerath is an Ortsgemeinde – a municipality belonging to a Verbandsgemeinde, a kind of collective municipality – in the Bernkastel-Wittlich district in Rhineland-Palatinate, Germany.

== Geography ==
The municipality lies on the edge of the Southern Eifel in the Wittlich Depression between Wittlich and Trier, five kilometres away from the Moselle, and is therefore known in officialdom as “Hetzerath (Mosel)”. It belongs to the Verbandsgemeinde of Wittlich-Land, whose seat is in Wittlich, although that town is itself not in the Verbandsgemeinde.

== History ==
In 893, Hetzerath had its first documentary mention as Salmana ("Homestead of the Salm"). In the 9th or 10th century the name was changed to Hecelroide ("Hezilo’s Clearing"). The oldest documentary mention after the name change comes from 1068. Beginning in 1794, Hetzerath lay under French rule. In 1814 it was assigned to the Kingdom of Prussia at the Congress of Vienna. Since 1947, it has been part of the then newly founded state of Rhineland-Palatinate.

== Politics ==
=== Municipal council ===
The council is made up of 16 council members, who were elected by proportional representation at the municipal election held on 7 June 2009, and the honorary mayor as chairman.

The municipal election held on 7 June 2009 yielded the following results:

Year	SPD	CDU	FBL	WG Wagner	Total
2009	3	3	9	1	16 seats

=== Coat of arms ===
The municipality's arms might be described thus: Argent two bars in chief and as many in base azure surmounted by a cross gules, itself surmounted by a fleur-de-lis of the first.

== Economy and infrastructure ==
In the village is a railway station on the Koblenz-Trier line. Landesstraße (State Road) 141 runs through the municipality's full length.

A further economic factor is the Industriepark Region Trier (IRT) between Föhren and Hetzerath. Here, roughly 80 businesses are located, furnishing many jobs for the region, and also for Hetzerath.
