= Ober-Hilbersheim =

- Municipality
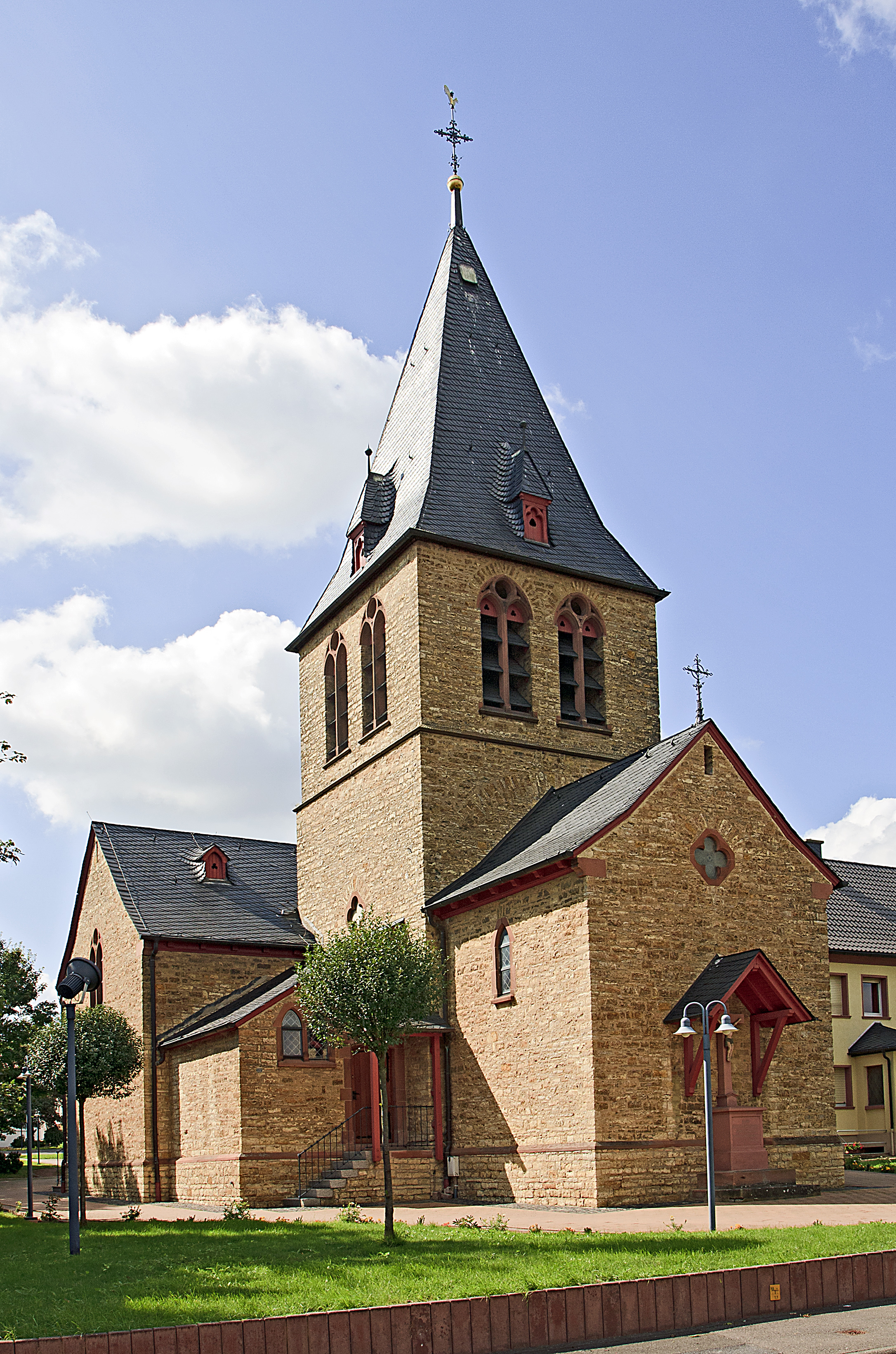
- Church of Saint Joseph

- Coat of arms

- Location of Ober-Hilbersheim within Mainz-Bingen district
- Interactive map of Ober-Hilbersheim
- Location within Germany Location within Rhineland-Palatinate
- Coordinates: 49°53′59″N 8°01′44″E
- Country: Germany
- State: Rhineland-Palatinate
- District: Mainz-Bingen
- Municipal assoc.: Gau-Algesheim

Government
  - Mayor (2019–24): Heiko Schmuck

Area
  - Total: 7.38 km^{2} (2.85 sq mi)
- Elevation: 254 m (833 ft)

Population (2025-12-31)
  - Total: 993
  - Density: 135/km^{2} (348/sq mi)
- Time zone: UTC+01:00 (CET)
  - Summer (DST): UTC+02:00 (CEST)
- Postal codes: 55437
- Dialling codes: 06728
- Vehicle registration: MZ
- Website: www.ober-hilbersheim.de

Ober-Hilbersheim is an Ortsgemeinde – a municipality belonging to a Verbandsgemeinde, a kind of collective municipality – in the Mainz-Bingen district in Rhineland-Palatinate, Germany.

== Geography ==
=== Location ===
The municipality lies southwest of Mainz on the Welzbach and is an agriculturally based community. The winegrowing centre belongs to the Verbandsgemeinde of Gau-Algesheim, whose seat is in the like-named town.

== History ==
In 1108, Ober-Hilbersheim had its first documentary mention as Hilbridisheim.

== Politics ==
=== Municipal council ===
The council is made up of 12 council members who were elected in a municipal election held on 13 June 2004 by majority vote.

=== Mayors ===
- 1946-????: Karl Lahr (FDP, as of 1956 FVP, as of 1957 DP)
- 2001-incumbent: Heiko Schmuck

=== Coat of arms ===
The municipality's arms might be described thus: Azure a horse's head couped at the neck Or langued gules.

== Culture and sightseeing ==
=== Regular events ===
- The Ober-Hilbersheim Wine and Art Fair takes place early every July.
- The Ober-Hilbersheim Christmas Market is held on the second weekend in Advent.

== Economy and infrastructure ==
=== Transport ===
The municipality is crossed by the L 415 state road. The Autobahnen A 60, A 61 and A 63 can be reached by car in 10 to 20 minutes.

=== Education ===
- Municipal kindergarten
