= Nieder-Hilbersheim =

- Municipality
- Coat of arms

- Location of Nieder-Hilbersheim within Mainz-Bingen district
- Interactive map of Nieder-Hilbersheim
- Location within Germany Location within Rhineland-Palatinate
- Coordinates: 49°54′47″N 8°02′30″E
- Country: Germany
- State: Rhineland-Palatinate
- District: Mainz-Bingen
- Municipal assoc.: Gau-Algesheim

Government
  - Mayor (2019–24): Rosemarie Jantz

Area
  - Total: 4.59 km^{2} (1.77 sq mi)
- Elevation: 244 m (801 ft)

Population (2025-12-31)
  - Total: 630
  - Density: 140/km^{2} (360/sq mi)
- Time zone: UTC+01:00 (CET)
  - Summer (DST): UTC+02:00 (CEST)
- Postal codes: 55437
- Dialling codes: 06728
- Vehicle registration: MZ
- Website: www.nieder-hilbersheim.de

Nieder-Hilbersheim is an Ortsgemeinde – a municipality belonging to a Verbandsgemeinde, a kind of collective municipality – in the Mainz-Bingen district in Rhineland-Palatinate, Germany.

== Geography ==
=== Location ===
The municipality lies southwest of Mainz in the Welzbach valley and is characterized by agriculture. The winegrowing centre belongs to the Verbandsgemeinde of Gau-Algesheim, whose seat is in the like-named town.

== History ==
In 933, Nieder-Hilbersheim had its first documentary mention in a document from the Seligenstadt Abbey.

In the endowment letter from the Disbodenberg Monastery in 1108, Nieder-Hilbersheim is mentioned for the first time as Hilbriedesheim

After 1300, the name Nieder-Hilbersheim first came up in documents.

In 1334 a church is mentioned for the first time, and is believed to have been consecrated to Saint Martin, which yielded today's coat of arms, which show Saint Martin cutting a piece of his cloak off for a beggar. At this point, the community belonged to the Electorate of the Palatinate Oberamt of Stromberg.

== Politics ==
The municipal council is made up of 12 council members, not counting the part-time mayor, with seats apportioned thus:

	SPD	CDU	FWG	Total
2004	3	2	7	12 seats

(as at municipal election held on 13 June 2004)

== Culture and sightseeing ==
=== Regular events ===
The Nieder-Hilbersheim kermis (church consecration festival, locally known as the Kerb) is always held on the second weekend in September. A farmer's and craftsman's market is held each year on the third weekend in October.

== Economy and infrastructure ==
=== Agriculture ===
Nieder-Hilbersheim grows grapes for both white and red wine, and also fruit and asparagus.

=== Transport ===
The municipality is crossed by Landesstraße (state road) 415. The A 60 and A 63 autobahns can be reached by car in 10 to 20 minutes.

=== Education ===
Nieder-Hilbersheim has a municipal kindergarten.
