= Engelstadt =

- Municipality
- Coat of arms

- Location of Engelstadt within Mainz-Bingen district
- Interactive map of Engelstadt
- Location within Germany Location within Rhineland-Palatinate
- Coordinates: 49°54′15″N 8°03′55″E
- Country: Germany
- State: Rhineland-Palatinate
- District: Mainz-Bingen
- Municipal assoc.: Gau-Algesheim

Government
  - Mayor (2019–24): Christoph Neuberger

Area
  - Total: 7.76 km^{2} (3.00 sq mi)
- Elevation: 214 m (702 ft)

Population (2025-12-31)
  - Total: 721
  - Density: 92.9/km^{2} (241/sq mi)
- Time zone: UTC+01:00 (CET)
  - Summer (DST): UTC+02:00 (CEST)
- Postal codes: 55270
- Dialling codes: 06130
- Vehicle registration: MZ
- Website: www.engelstadt.de

Engelstadt (German pronunciation: [ˈɛŋl̩ʃtat]) is an Ortsgemeinde – a municipality belonging to a Verbandsgemeinde, a kind of collective municipality – in the Mainz-Bingen district in Rhineland-Palatinate, Germany.

== Geography ==
=== Location ===
The municipality lies southwest of Mainz and is an agriculturally oriented community. The winegrowing centre belongs to the Verbandsgemeinde of Gau-Algesheim, whose seat is in the like-named town.

== History ==
In 941, Engelstadt had its first documentary mention as Engilestat.

== Politics ==
=== Town council ===
The council is made up of 12 council members who were elected on 13 June 2004 by majority vote.

=== Coat of arms ===
The municipality's arms might be described thus: Azure an angel proper wings expanded, in his hand dexter a bunch of grapes slipped vert, in base sinister a church tower Or ensigned with a cross.

== Culture and sightseeing ==
=== Buildings ===
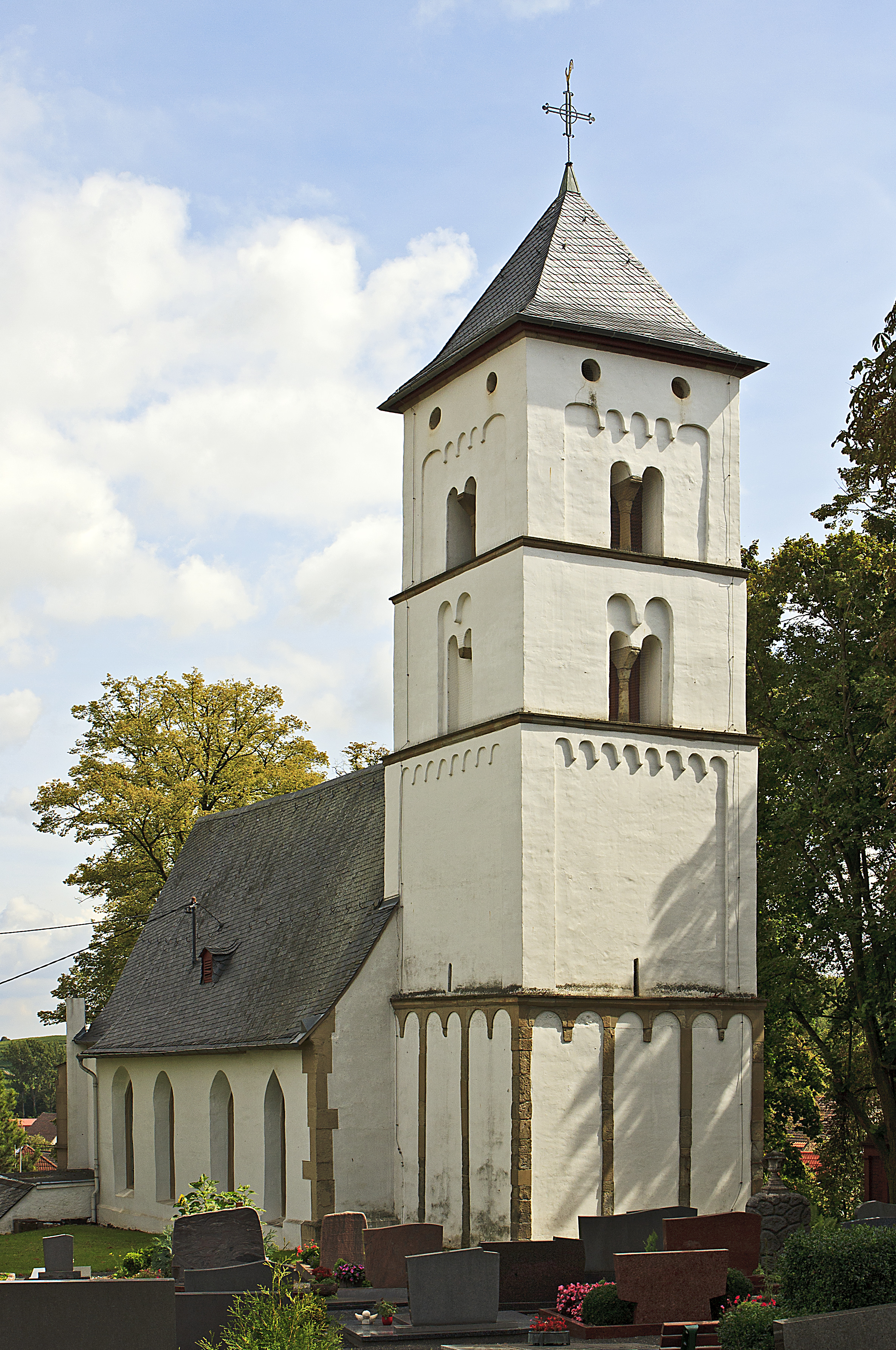
Evangelical parish church Saint Maurice

The Evangelical parish church had its first documentary mention in 1228 and is consecrated to Saint Maurice. Especially valuable is the Carolingian door lintel in the tower. The church houses an organ built in 1855 by Hermann Dreymann (Mainz).

=== Regular events ===
The Engelstadt kermis (church consecration festival, locally known as the Kerb) is held yearly on the second weekend in September and the village festival on the first weekend in July.

Furthermore, there has been in Engelstadt since 2003 the Rockhexennacht (“Rock Witches’ Night”). This is a live, outdoor concert with rock music held yearly on 30 April by the Engelstadt Cycling Club and the Engelstadt Youth Club.

== Economy and infrastructure ==
=== Transport ===
The municipality is crossed by Kreisstraße 16. The A 60 and A 63 autobahns can be reached by car in 10 to 20 minutes.

=== Education ===
- Municipal kindergarten
