= Appenheim =

- Municipality
- Coat of arms

- Location of Appenheim within Mainz-Bingen district
- Interactive map of Appenheim
- Location within Germany Location within Rhineland-Palatinate
- Coordinates: 49°55′47″N 8°01′59″E
- Country: Germany
- State: Rhineland-Palatinate
- District: Mainz-Bingen
- Municipal assoc.: Gau-Algesheim

Government
  - Mayor (2019–24): Georg Schacht (SPD)

Area
  - Total: 6.98 km^{2} (2.69 sq mi)
- Elevation: 183 m (600 ft)

Population (2025-12-31)
  - Total: 1,435
  - Density: 206/km^{2} (532/sq mi)
- Time zone: UTC+01:00 (CET)
  - Summer (DST): UTC+02:00 (CEST)
- Postal codes: 55437
- Dialling codes: 06725
- Vehicle registration: MZ
- Website: www.appenheim.de

Appenheim (German pronunciation: [ˈapn̩haɪm]) is an Ortsgemeinde – a municipality belonging to a Verbandsgemeinde, a kind of collective municipality – in the Mainz-Bingen district in Rhineland-Palatinate, Germany.

== Geography ==
=== Location ===
The municipality lies southwest of Mainz and is an agricultural community. The winegrowing centre belongs to the Verbandsgemeinde of Gau-Algesheim, whose seat is in the like-named town. Through the municipal area flow both the rivers Welzbach and Wethbach.

== History ==
In 882, Appenheim had its first documentary mention in the Prüm Abbey’s “Golden Book”.

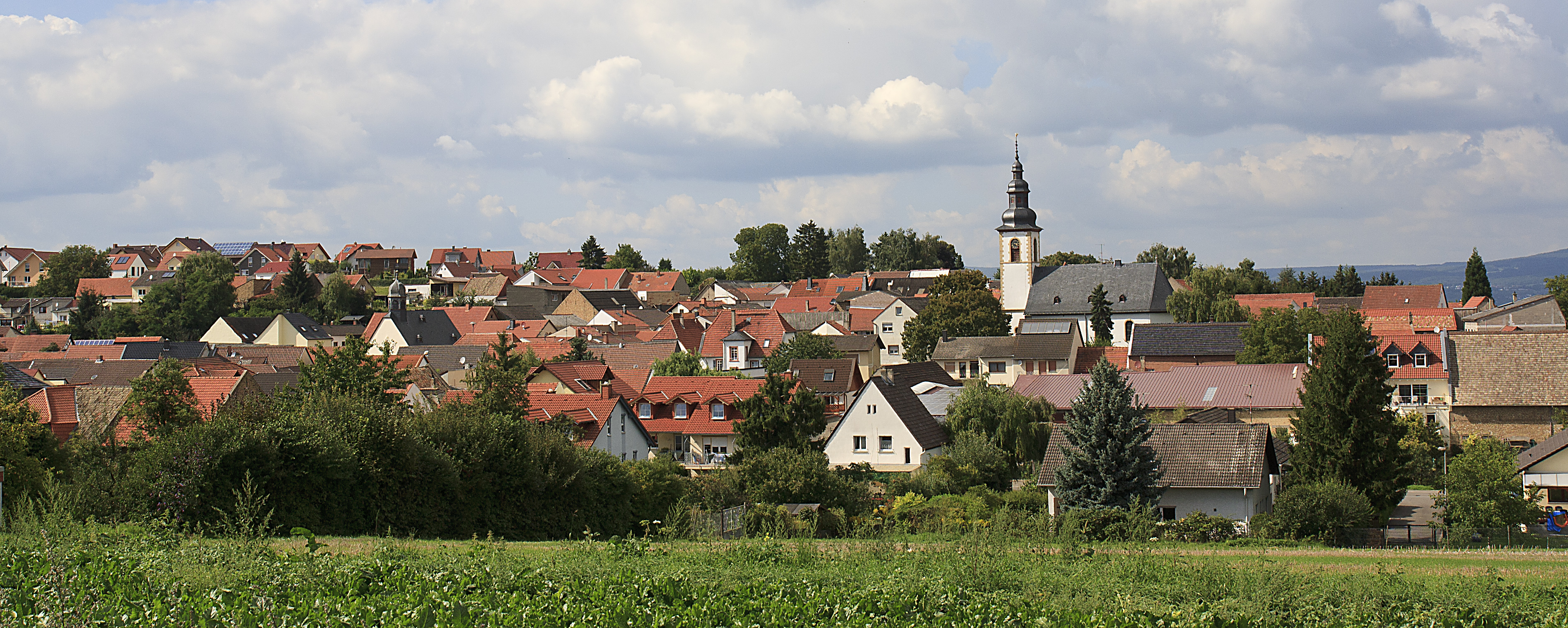
Appenheim

== Politics ==
=== Municipal council ===
The council is made up of 17 council members, counting the part-time mayor, with seats apportioned thus:

Elections in 2014:

- CDU: 7 seats
- SPD: 7 seats
- FDP: 2 seats

=== Town partnerships ===
- (Germany) Apfelstädt, Gotha district, Thuringia
- Marano di Valpolicella, Province of Verona, Veneto, Italy

== Culture and sightseeing ==
=== Regular events ===
The Appenheim kermis (church consecration festival, locally known as the Kerb) is always held in early June.

== Economy and infrastructure ==
=== Transport ===
The municipality is crossed by Landesstraße (state road) 415. The Autobahnen A 60 and A 63 can be reached by car in ten to twenty minutes.

=== Education ===
There are a municipal kindergarten and a primary school, Grundschule Welzbachtal.

== Curiosities ==
The Appenheimer Hundertgulden vineyard on the slopes of the Westerberg is the vineyard with the highest carbonate content of all in Germany. Wines from the mineral laden high pH soil have been described as having a "fruity sourness" and are purported to be salubrious.

== Famous people ==
=== Sons and daughters of the town ===
- Johann Horn (d. 1800), Palatine-Bavarian sergeant, Knight of the Bavarian Medal of Bravery
- Johann Konrad Schiede (b. about 1760 in Kassel; d. 19 September 1826 in Appenheim), was a clergyman, a participant in the Late Age of Enlightenment and an author of cheap novels.
- Esther Knewitz, Rheinhessen Wine Queen 2001–2002, German Wine Princess 2003-2004
