= Bubenheim, Mainz-Bingen =

Bubenheim
- Municipality
- Coat of arms

- Location of Bubenheim within Mainz-Bingen district
- Interactive map of Bubenheim
- Location within Germany Location within Rhineland-Palatinate
- Coordinates: 49°55′18″N 8°04′46″E
- Country: Germany
- State: Rhineland-Palatinate
- District: Mainz-Bingen
- Municipal assoc.: Gau-Algesheim

Government
  - Mayor (2019–24): Siegbert Felzer

Area
  - Total: 4.38 km^{2} (1.69 sq mi)
- Elevation: 141 m (463 ft)

Population (2025-12-31)
  - Total: 823
  - Density: 188/km^{2} (487/sq mi)
- Time zone: UTC+01:00 (CET)
  - Summer (DST): UTC+02:00 (CEST)
- Postal codes: 55270
- Dialling codes: 06130
- Vehicle registration: MZ
- Website: www.bubenheim.de

Bubenheim (German pronunciation: [ˈbuːbn̩haɪm]) is an Ortsgemeinde – a municipality belonging to a Verbandsgemeinde, a kind of collective municipality – in the Mainz-Bingen district in Rhineland-Palatinate, Germany.

== Geography ==
=== Location ===
The municipality lies in the Selztal landscape conservation area with the nature conservation areas of Talberg, Flößrich/Gänsklauer and Binger Wiese. The winemaking centre belongs to the Verbandsgemeinde of Gau-Algesheim, whose seat is in the like-named town.

=== Population development ===
Over the last 150 years, the population figure has lain at about 500 or 550, although in the last ten years, it has grown to about 900.

== Politics ==
=== Municipal council ===
The council is made up of 12 council members who were elected by majority vote in a municipal election held on 25 May 2014, and the honorary mayor as chairman.

=== Coat of arms ===
The municipality's arms might be described thus: Per fess at the nombril point Or an eagle displayed sable armed, langued and beaked gules, and gules in fess an ear of grain bendwise leafed, a cherry twig fructed of two and leafed of one and a bunch of grapes slipped bendwise sinister of the first.

== Culture and sightseeing ==
=== Buildings ===
The Evangelical and Catholic churches in Bubenheim are both open to visitors and stand near the village square.

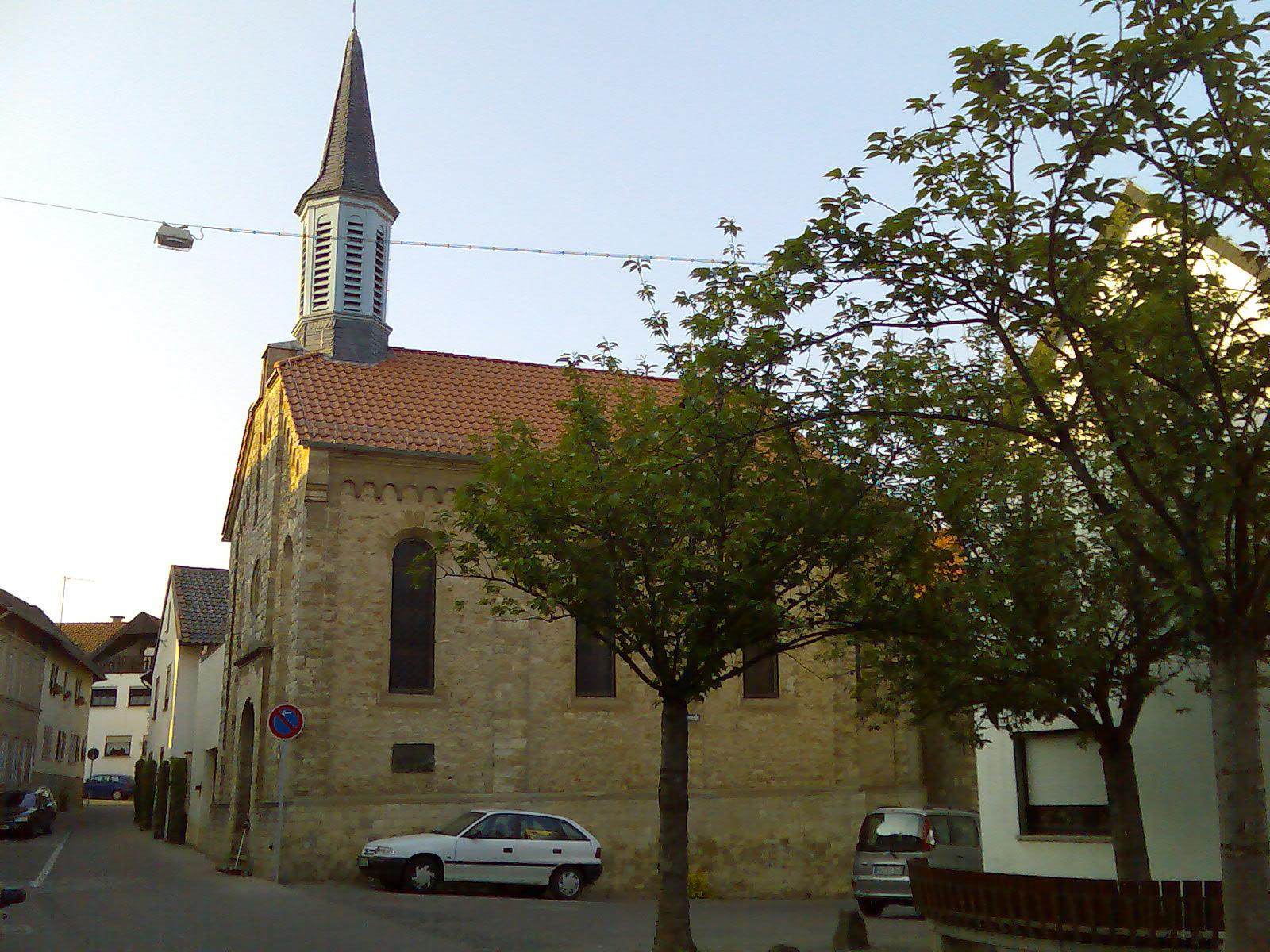
Catholic church

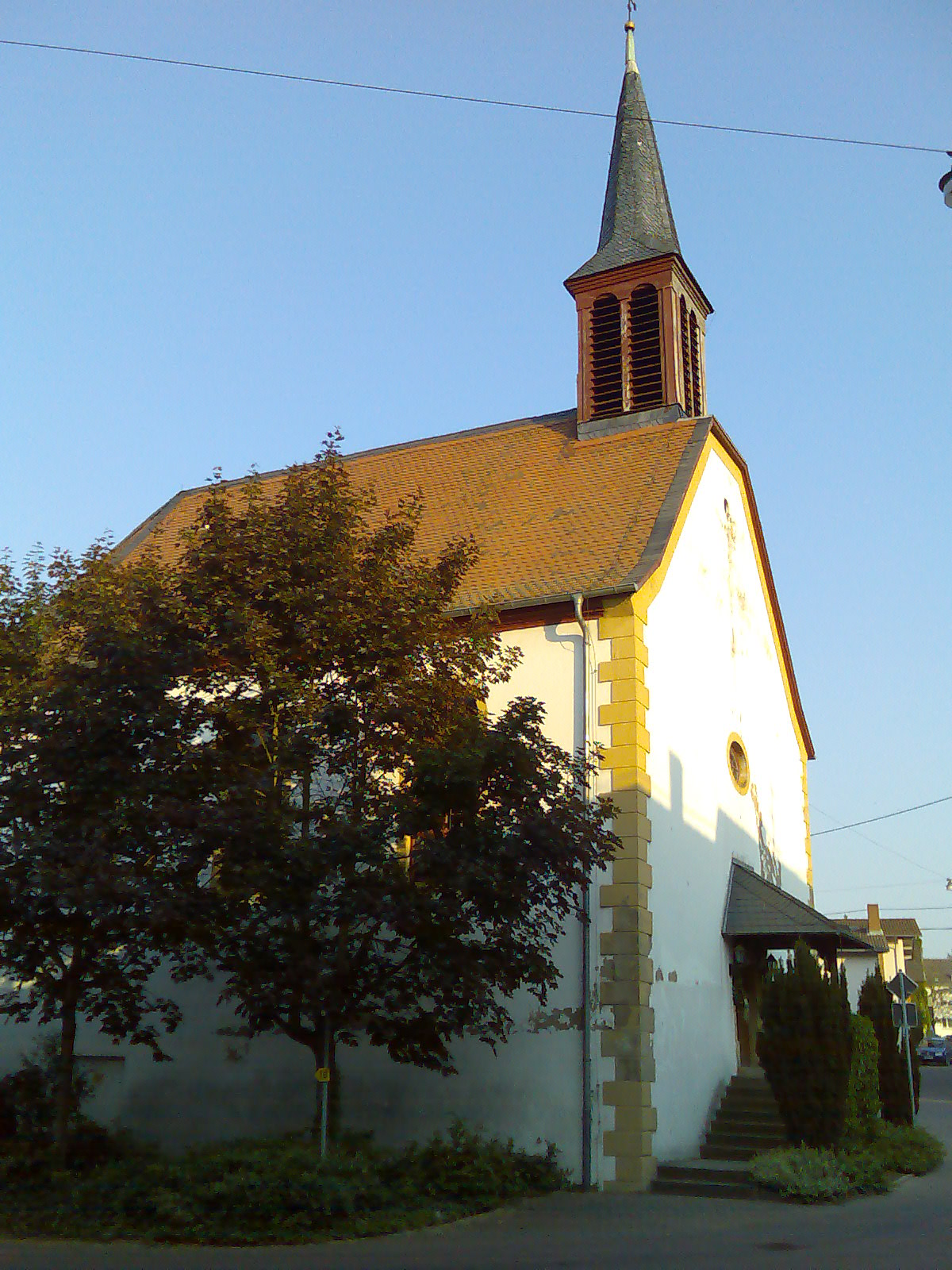
Evangelical church

=== Leisure and sport ===
Clubs in the municipality are the gymnastic club TV 1898 Bubenheim, the table tennis club TTC Bubenheim and the singing club Gesangverein 1879 Bubenheim with the offshoot Weedies Soundtrain. An institution known beyond Germany's borders is the film production company Exquiser Films.

=== Regular events ===
The Bubenheim kermis (church consecration festival, locally known as the Kerb) is always held on the third weekend in July.

== Economy and infrastructure ==
Bubenheim is known above all for its winegrowing in the Kallenberg and Honigberg vineyards. Besides wine, though, asparagus and fruit are also counted among the municipality's main sources of income. The proximity to Ingelheim (Boehringer), Mainz (ZDF, Schott) and to the Frankfurt Rhine Main Region makes Bubenheim a popular dormitory and weekend village for many commuters.

=== Transport ===
The community is crossed by Kreisstraße 16. The A 60 autobahns and A 63 can be reached by car in 10 to 20 minutes.

=== Education ===
- Municipal kindergarten

== Famous people ==
=== Honorary citizens ===
- Dr. h.c. Walter Zoth

=== Sons and daughters of the town ===
- Fritz Bockius, (1882–1945), German jurist and politician (Zentrum), Member of the Reichstag
