= Kyll Viaduct =

Kyll Viaduct Kylltalbrücke
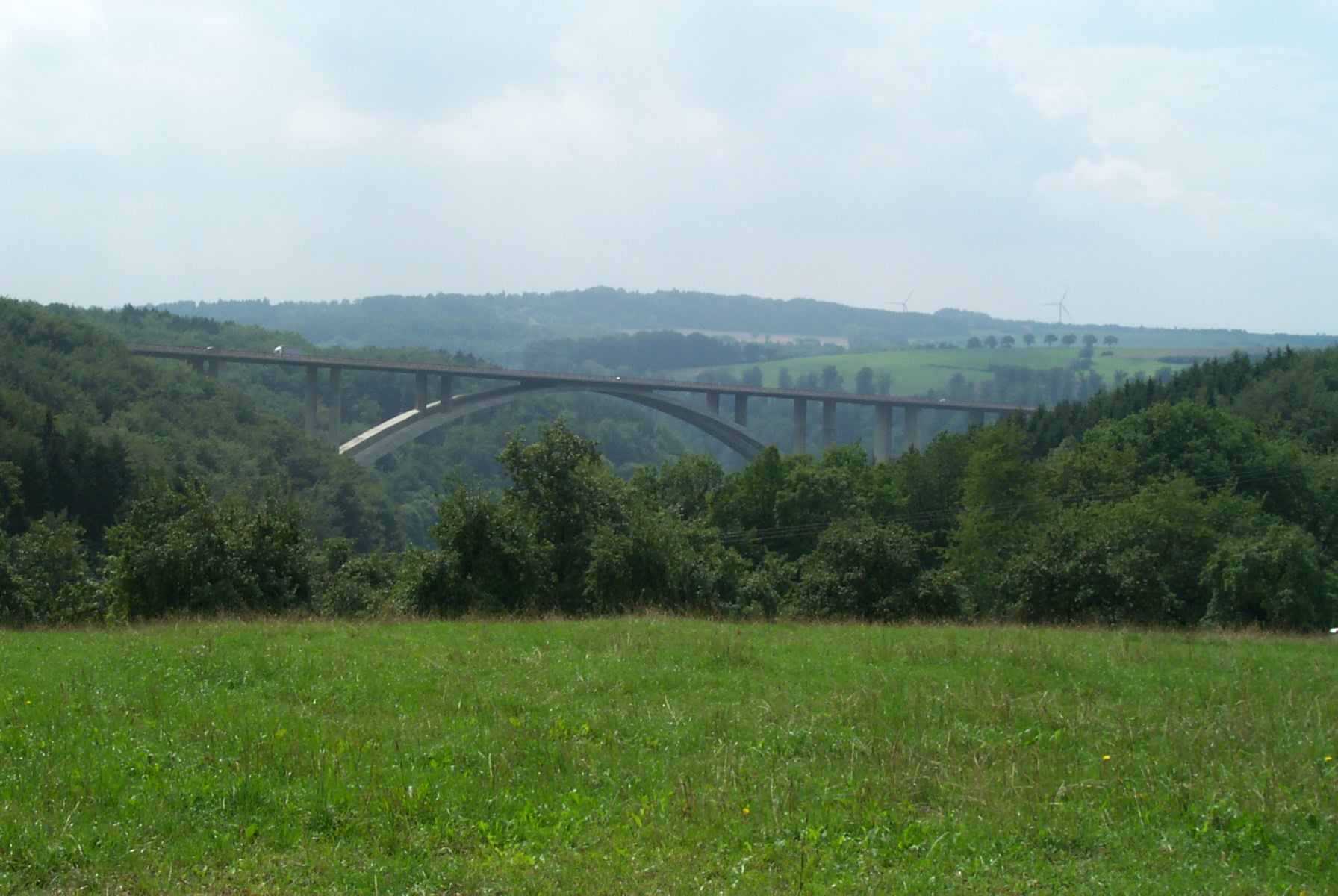
- seen from Wilsecker
- Coordinates: 50.0198°N 6.5748°E
- Carries: Bundesautobahn 60
- Crosses: Kyll
- Locale: Bitburg

Characteristics
- Design: Reinforced concrete arch bridge
- Total length: 645 metres (2,116 ft)
- Width: 2 × 15 metres (49 ft)
- Height: 93 metres (305 ft)
- Longest span: 223 metres (732 ft)

History
- Construction start: 1995
- Construction end: 1999
- Construction cost: 75 million DM

Location
- Interactive map of Kyll Viaduct

The Kyll Viaduct (German: Kylltalbrücke) has a span of 223 metres (732 ft) and is the largest arch bridge in Germany that is made entirely of reinforced concrete and prestressed concrete.

The bridge carries the A 60 motorway over the valley of the Kyll in the Eifel mountains near Wilsecker between the junctions of Bitburg and Badem, and was built from 1995 to 1999. It has a total length of 645 metres and a maximum height of 93 metres.

== See also ==
- List of bridges in Germany
