= Ockenheim =

- Municipality
- Coat of arms

- Location of Ockenheim within Mainz-Bingen district
- Interactive map of Ockenheim
- Location within Germany Location within Rhineland-Palatinate
- Coordinates: 49°56′31″N 07°58′19″E
- Country: Germany
- State: Rhineland-Palatinate
- District: Mainz-Bingen
- Municipal assoc.: Gau-Algesheim

Government
  - Mayor (2024–29): Sabine Maidhof (CDU)

Area
  - Total: 6.03 km^{2} (2.33 sq mi)
- Elevation: 261 m (856 ft)

Population (2025-12-31)
  - Total: 2,699
  - Density: 448/km^{2} (1,160/sq mi)
- Time zone: UTC+01:00 (CET)
  - Summer (DST): UTC+02:00 (CEST)
- Postal codes: 55437
- Dialling codes: 06725
- Vehicle registration: MZ
- Website: www.ockenheim.de

Ockenheim (German pronunciation: [ˈɔkn̩haɪm]) is an Ortsgemeinde – a municipality belonging to a Verbandsgemeinde, a kind of collective municipality – in the Mainz-Bingen district in Rhineland-Palatinate, Germany.

== Geography ==
=== Location ===
The winegrowing centre lies in Rhenish Hesse, and belongs to the Verbandsgemeinde of Gau-Algesheim, whose seat is in the like-named town.

== History ==
In 835, Ockenheim had its first documentary mention. The Marian monastery St. Maria ad Gradus in Mainz held a considerable share of the local landholdings and in return saw to it that the place was supplied with pastoral care.

=== Population development ===
By opening up new residential areas and a commercial area, Ockenheim grew and the original settlement pattern was changed.

== Politics ==
=== Municipal council ===
The council is made up of 19 council members, counting the mayor, with seats apportioned thus:

| | CDU | SPD | BWO | Total |
| 2024 | 11 | 1 | 8 | 19 seats |
| 2019 | 11 | 2 | 7 | 19 seats |

(as at municipal election held on 9 June 2024)

The council's size is fixed at 16 seats. The mayor and the two deputies are, given their offices, on the council as well (hence 19).

=== Town partnerships ===
- Povegliano Veronese, Province of Verona, Veneto, Italy

=== Coat of arms ===
The municipality's arms might be described thus: Argent a chevron reversed azure.

The earliest known seal dates from 1457 and shows the same composition as today's arms, with the “reversed” (that is, upside down) chevron. The same also appeared in all later seals. The arms are based on those once borne by the Lords of Ockenheim, the local vassals who had been enfeoffed by the Archbishops of Mainz.

== Economy and infrastructure ==
=== Transport ===
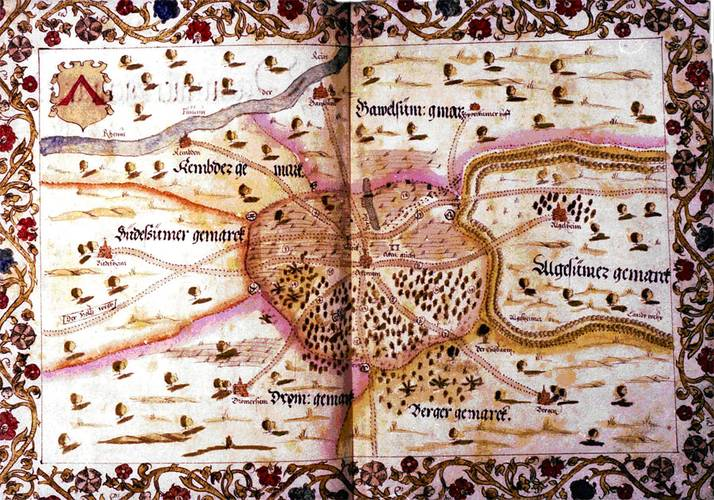
Gottfried Mascop: Map of Ockenheim municipal area from 1577

With regards to transport, the municipality is favourably located on Autobahn A 60 and near Autobahn A 61. The station on the Gau Algesheim–Bad Kreuznach line, connecting to the Nahe Valley line to Saarbrücken was re-opened in 1996. Ockenheim is linked to the Bingen am Rhein municipal bus network.

=== Education ===
- Municipal kindergarten
- Katholischer Kindergarten St. Christophorus (Catholic kindergarten)
- Grundschule Ockenheim (primary school)

=== Sport and leisure ===
The sporting grounds Auf dem Kissel were dedicated in 1990. Since then, among other things, a clubhouse, tennis courts, a barbecue pavilion, a boules field and a beach volleyball court have all been added.

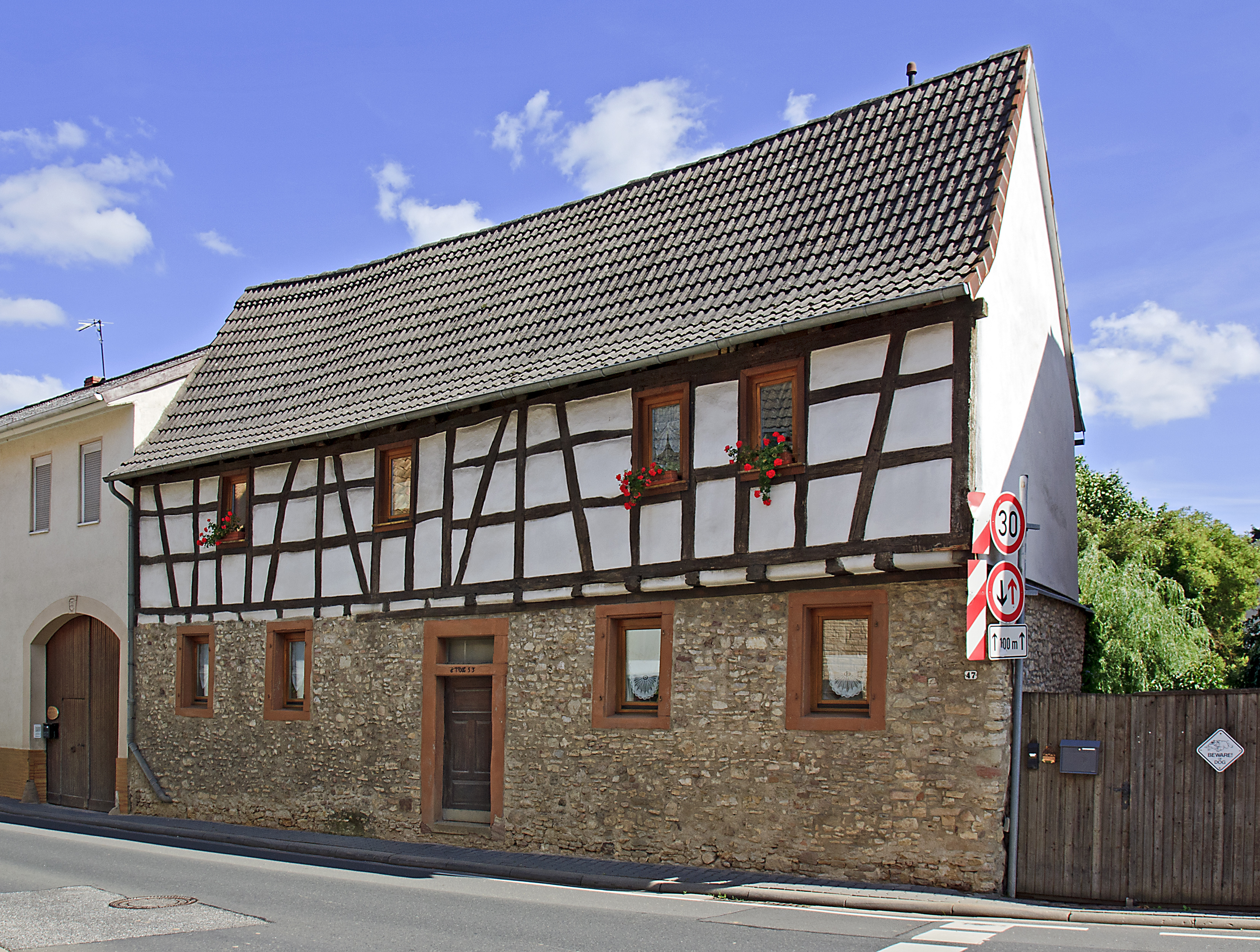
Half-timbered house

== Culture and sightseeing ==
- Jakobsberg Priory
- Winegrowing
- Chestnut tree from 1648
- Saint Peter's and Saint Paul's Parish Church, built in 1774
- ”Peace Cross” on the Ockenheimer Hörnchen from 1952
