= T US 380 =

6th-8th century skeleton in Italy

- Born: 6th–8th century
- Died: 6th–8th century
- Body discovered: Povegliano Veronese, Veneto, Italy
- Other names: Medieval Terminator
- Known for: Prosthetic arm

T US 380 (also dubbed Medieval Terminator) refers to the skeleton of a medieval man discovered in a necropolis in Povegliano Veronese, Veneto, Italy in 1996, dating from the 6th to 8th centuries. This individual, who had his right hand amputated, survived the amputation and lived with a knife attached to his forearm as a prosthetic limb.

The skeleton, labelled T US 380, is notable for the evidence of a well-healed amputation, a knife prosthetic, and the remarkable survival of the individual in a pre-antibiotic era. The individual appeared to have died in his 40s - 50s, which was old age for the time period. The skeleton shows he had signs of wear on his teeth, supposedly from fastening a leather strap to keep his prosthetic in place, and an oddly placed shoulder from keeping his arm in unnatural positions.
