= Jakobsberg Priory =

Monastery in Ockenheim, Germany

Coordinates: 49°56′09″N 7°59′13″E

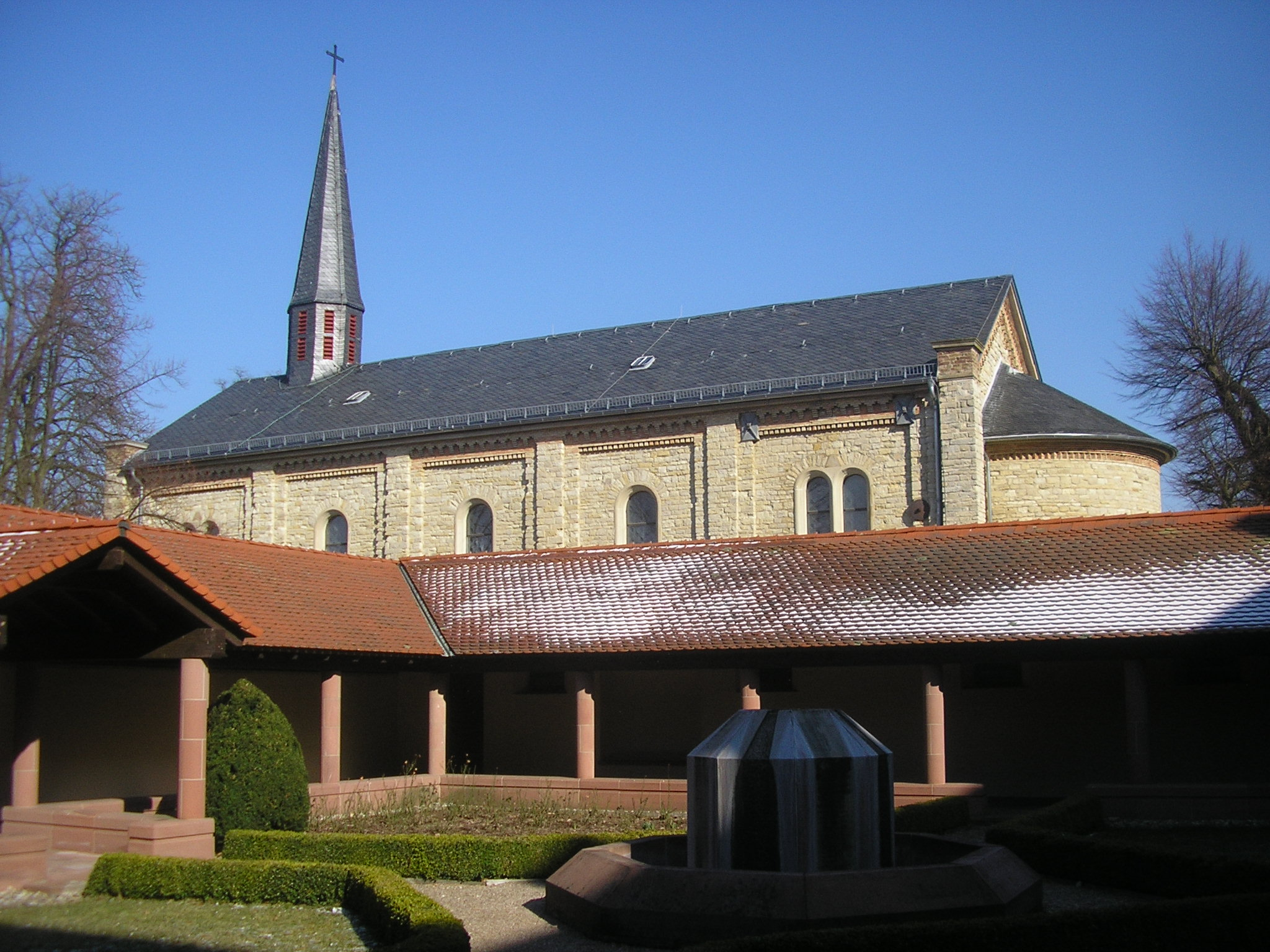
Cloister and church of Jakobsberg Priory

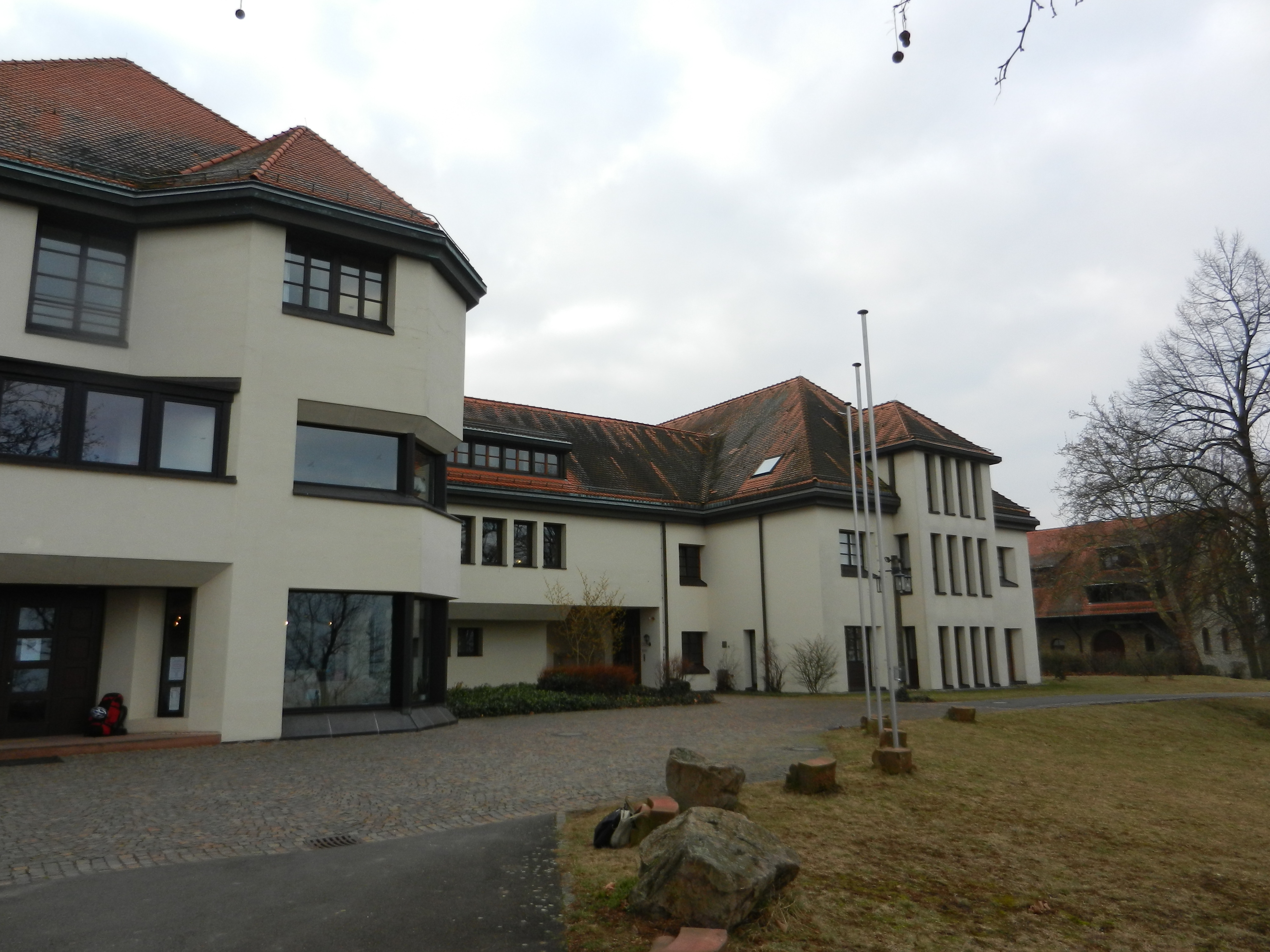
Educational centre and youth hostel (right)

Jakobsberg Priory is a Benedictine monastery at Ockenheim, in the district of Mainz-Bingen, Rhineland-Palatinate, Germany. It belongs to the missionary Ottilien Congregation of the Benedictine Confederation.

== History ==
The monastery developed from a place of pilgrimage founded in 1720, in honour of the Fourteen Holy Helpers. At first there was only a small chapel with a hermitage, but in view of the growing popularity of the site it was already being proposed in the 19th century that a monastery should be founded here in order to look after it.

The first monks, who were Trappists, did not however arrive until 1921. The Generalate of the order had decreed the dissolution of the community as early as 1930, and this eventually took place in 1949. Between 1951 and 1960 the monastery accommodated the novitiate of the East German province of the Jesuits.

With the troubles in Africa of the 1960s many of the missionary orders found themselves obliged to withdraw their brothers from the crisis areas, to forestall their expulsion. For this reason the Ottilien Congregation acquired the buildings on the Jakobsberg at the end of the 1960s, and the first group of monks moved in on 31 January 1961.
