= Christian Erbach =

German organist and composer

Christian Erbach (ca. 1568 – 14 June 1635) was a German organist and composer.

Erbach was born in Gau-Algesheim, Mainz-Bingen, now in the Rhineland-Palatinate Bundesland, and began to study musical composition at a considerably young age. Aside from the location of his birth and the mere fact that he studied the art of musical composition, the history of Erbach's youth is unknown.

Throughout most of his life, Erbach held the position of assistant or chief organist for the city of Augsburg. One may consider him a composer of reverence during his lifetime because many of his students, both Protestant and Roman Catholic, were attracted to his talent. The influence upon the music of Erbach was primarily Venetian notwithstanding the indubitable characteristics of Hans Leo Haßler within his keyboard works. The most popular pieces by Erbach include In ihren grossen Nöthen (1609) and Madrigal Tirsi morir. Erbach died in Augsburg.

Outside the context of instrumental music, Erbach also wrote pieces for church services and the liturgical festivals. He was considered to have a fine ear for the organ and was thus consulted during the development of several 17th-century instruments.
