= Gau-Algesheim (Verbandsgemeinde) =

- Verbandsgemeinde
- Location of Gau-Algesheim within Mainz-Bingen district
- Interactive map of Gau-Algesheim
- Location within Germany Location within Rhineland-Palatinate
- Coordinates: 49°57′N 8°01′E
- Country: Germany
- State: Rhineland-Palatinate
- District: Mainz-Bingen
- Seat: Gau-Algesheim
- Subdivisions: 8 municipalities

Area
  - Total: 60.6 km^{2} (23.4 sq mi)

Population (2025-12-31)
  - Total: 16,311
  - Density: 269/km^{2} (697/sq mi)
- Time zone: UTC+01:00 (CET)
  - Summer (DST): UTC+02:00 (CEST)
- Website: www.vg-gau-algesheim.de

Gau-Algesheim is a Verbandsgemeinde ("collective municipality") in the district Mainz-Bingen in Rhineland-Palatinate, Germany. The seat of the Verbandsgemeinde is in Gau-Algesheim.

The Verbandsgemeinde Gau-Algesheim consists of the following Ortsgemeinden ("local municipalities"):

1. Appenheim
2. Bubenheim
3. Engelstadt
4. Gau-Algesheim
5. Nieder-Hilbersheim
6. Ober-Hilbersheim
7. Ockenheim
8. Schwabenheim an der Selz
