= Bergweiler =

- Municipality
- Coat of arms
- Interactive map of Bergweiler
- Location within Germany Location within Rhineland-Palatinate
- Coordinates: 49°58′00″N 06°49′31″E
- Country: Germany
- State: Rhineland-Palatinate
- District: Bernkastel-Wittlich
- Municipal assoc.: Wittlich-Land

Government
  - Mayor (2019–24): Horst Weber

Area
  - Total: 13.22 km^{2} (5.10 sq mi)
- Elevation: 310 m (1,020 ft)

Population (2025-12-31)
  - Total: 838
  - Density: 63.4/km^{2} (164/sq mi)
- Time zone: UTC+01:00 (CET)
  - Summer (DST): UTC+02:00 (CEST)
- Postal codes: 54518
- Dialling codes: 06571
- Vehicle registration: WIL
- Website: www.og-bergweiler.de

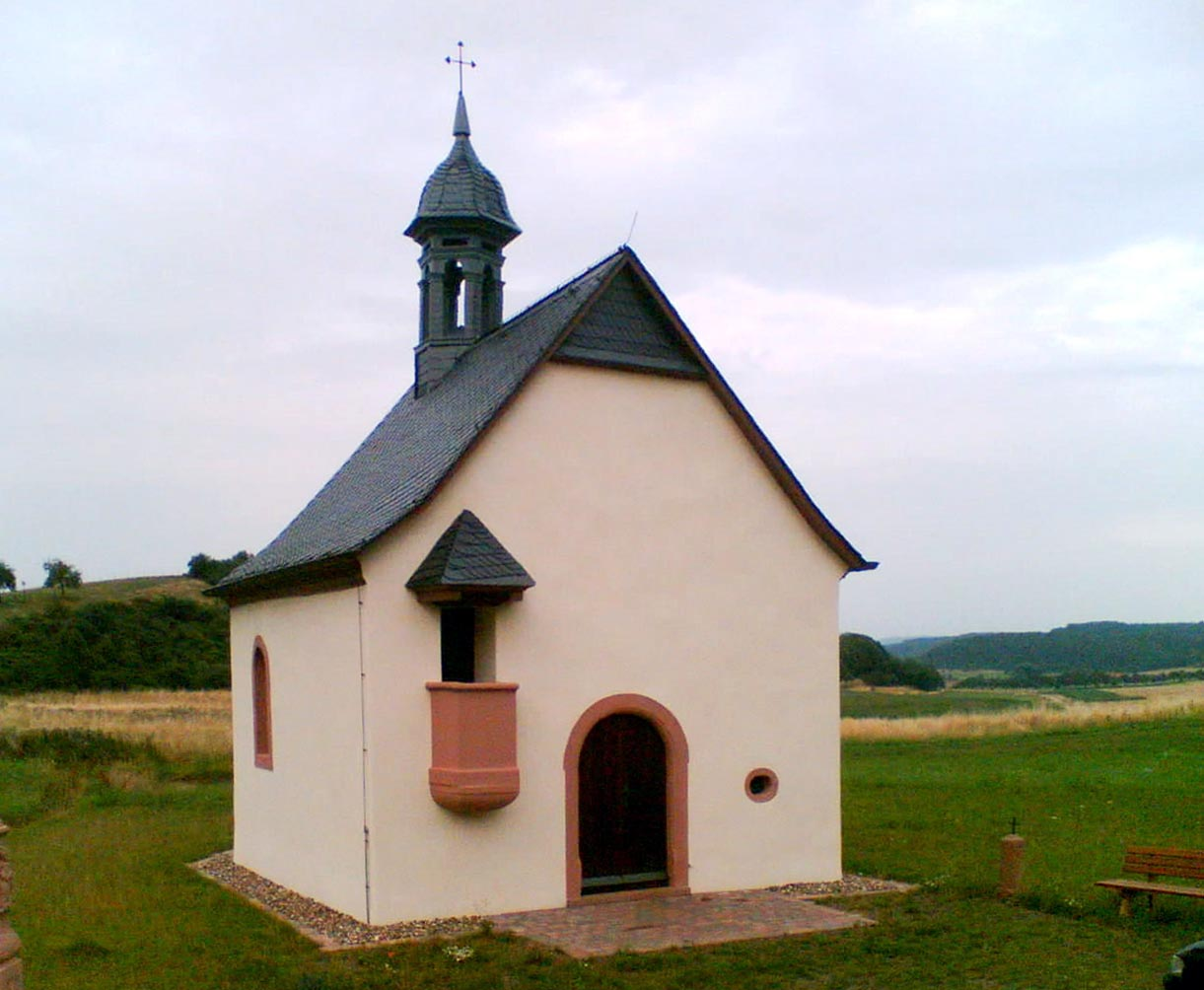
Fintenkapelle

Bergweiler (German pronunciation: [ˈbɛʁkvaɪlɐ]) is an Ortsgemeinde – a municipality belonging to a Verbandsgemeinde, a kind of collective municipality – in the Bernkastel-Wittlich district in Rhineland-Palatinate, Germany.

== Geography ==
=== Location ===
The municipality lies some 5 km west of the district seat, Wittlich, in the southern Eifel at an elevation of some 300 m above sea level, and affords a raised view into the Wittlicher Senke (depression). Bergweiler belongs to the Verbandsgemeinde of Wittlich-Land, whose seat is in Wittlich, although that town is itself not in the Verbandsgemeinde.

Formerly the municipality was called “Bergweiler über Wittlich” (“above Wittlich”), which expressed both the proximity to the district seat and the municipality's geographical location.

=== Land use ===
The municipal area measures 13.25 km^{2} of which 5.71 km^{2} is used for agriculture and 6.33 km^{2} is wooded.

=== Neighbouring municipalities ===
Bergweiler's neighbours are Wittlich, Bruch, Dreis and Hupperath.

== History ==
Near Bergweiler, traces of Stone Age settlement – stone tools – have been found that have been dated to around 3000 BC. There are also clues that point to Roman settlement near the village.

In 981, Bergweiler had its first documentary mention as Wilre, an archaic form of the German word Weiler, meaning “hamlet”. Thereafter the name changed several times, mostly to fit the ever-changing language. Thus the village was in 1056 called Villaris, in 1171 Reinboldvillari, in 1184 Villare, in 1190 Vilare, in 1219 Wilare, in 1243 Remboldswilre, in the 14th century Wilre supra montem, in 1417 Wiler, in 1428 Wilre, in 1487 Wyler, in 1569 Bergwiler and then eventually Bergweiler in 1656. In an episcopal visitation protocol from 1669, this name is used for Bergweiler.

From this same protocol comes the first mention of a small church, which is known today as the Fintenkapelle. As early as the 13th century, Bergweiler was being described as a parish seat. In 1669 and 1833, the church was newly built on the same spot in what was then the centre of Bergweiler (Unterdorf, or “Lower Village”). In 1957, Saint John's Catholic Church (Kirche St. Johannes) was renovated and partly converted, for the most part through the inhabitants’ own work. Neighbouring the church with its forecourt is a graveyard. Housed in the accompanying parish hall is the village's Eifel-Heimat-Museum, a local history museum.

The Fintenkapelle, outside the village, from the 17th century, frequented as a local pilgrimage church, was in 1959 likewise renovated. The small field chapel is known as a pilgrimage chapel for sick children. Formerly, the sick child's weight in a crib in grain was used to determine the donation that had to be made to the chapel for its use. The many votive tablets inside the chapel still bear witness today to the chapel's function as a place of prayer. Architecturally interesting is the little pulpit outside the chapel. It was formerly necessary for the priest to preach to believers gathered outside in the open field before the chapel from this outdoor pulpit because the chapel was too small. The chapel was first mentioned in 1656; it was newly built in 1717. In 2004, the chapel was once again lavishly renovated by local volunteer helpers, and since then it has shone with new radiance. The Fintenkapelle is the municipality's landmark.

Before the French Revolution, the Lords of Warsberg held the landlordship in the Imperial Knightly Lordship of Bergweiler. Years-long legal proceedings over Imperial immediacy before the Imperial Chamber Court were rendered obsolete in 1794 by the French occupation of the area. In 1815, Bergweiler became part of the Kingdom of Prussia. Since 1946, it has been part of the then newly founded state of Rhineland-Palatinate.

The village is even today, both by the inhabitants and on maps, divided into two Ortsteile. The old centre with the church is called Bergweiler or Unterdorf (“Lower Village”), whereas the newer part, which is a few metres higher than the older part, is called Oberbergweiler or Oberdorf (“Upper Village”). Meanwhile, the further building that comes with population growth means that the village is growing together more and more.

== Politics ==
=== Municipal council ===
The council is made up of 12 council members, who were elected by proportional representation at the municipal election held on 7 June 2009, and the honorary mayor as chairman.

The twelve seats on council are shared between the Thielen voters’ group (7 seats) and the Bergweiler free voters’ group (5 seats).

=== Coat of arms ===
The German blazon reads: Schild geteilt, oben in Schwarz ein goldbekrönter und goldbewehrter silberner wachsender Löwe, unten Silber-Rot geschacht.

The municipality's arms might in English heraldic language be described thus: Per fess sable a demi-lion rampant argent armed and crowned Or and chequy argent and gules.

To establish the historical basis for Bergweiler's coat of arms, one must go back to the territorial situation before 1789. Bergweiler's landlord was the Baron of Warsberg. He exercised his powers within the Imperially immediate Lordship of Bergweiler, which had been transferred to the Counts of Sponheim. Bergweiler's coat of arms must therefore express both the overlordship of the Counts of Sponheim and the landlordship of the Barons of Warsberg. This was done by composing a coat of arms party per fess (divided crosswise through the centre) whose lower half shows the Sponheims’ silver and red checkerboard pattern, and whose upper half shows a black field charged with the Warsbergs’ silver lion.

By approval in 1967, Bergweiler was granted the right to bear its own arms.

== Culture and sightseeing ==
- At the Eifel-Heimat-Museum (Kirchstraße 3), agricultural equipment and tools from the 19th century are shown. In the middle of the museum stands an oil painting that shows one of the many legends surrounding the history of the Wittlich Säubrennerkirmes (a folk festival started in 1950 and based on a 14th-century legend). The painting, believed to be the biggest oil painting in Rhineland-Palatinate, was painted by Otto Frankfurter.
- The Werthelstein (also called Wedelstein or Würstelstein, or dialectally, Werdelsteen) is a pillarlike, isolated crag measuring some two to three metres in cross-section with relatively smooth surfaces. It stands at the municipal limit, where it crosses the old way from Bergweiler to Dreis. According to legend it is a sacrifice stone. Since 1940 it has been a natural monument.
- Fintenkapelle: a small pilgrimage chapel from the 17th century outside the village.
