= Winterspelt =

- Municipality
- Coat of arms

- Location of Winterspelt within Eifelkreis Bitburg-Prüm district
- Interactive map of Winterspelt
- Location within Germany Location within Rhineland-Palatinate
- Coordinates: 50°12′50″N 6°12′52″E
- Country: Germany
- State: Rhineland-Palatinate
- District: Eifelkreis Bitburg-Prüm
- Municipal assoc.: Prüm
- Subdivisions: 11

Government
  - Mayor (2019–24): Edgar Henkes

Area
  - Total: 25.60 km^{2} (9.88 sq mi)
- Elevation: 500 m (1,600 ft)

Population (2025-12-31)
  - Total: 831
  - Density: 32.5/km^{2} (84.1/sq mi)
- Time zone: UTC+01:00 (CET)
  - Summer (DST): UTC+02:00 (CEST)
- Postal codes: 54616
- Dialling codes: 06555
- Vehicle registration: BIT
- Website: www.winterspelt.de

Winterspelt (German pronunciation: [ˈvɪntɐˌʃpɛlt]) is a municipality in the district of Bitburg-Prüm, in Rhineland-Palatinate, western Germany.
