= Povegliano Veronese =

Povegliano Veronese Povejan (Venetian)
- Comune
- Comune di Povegliano Veronese
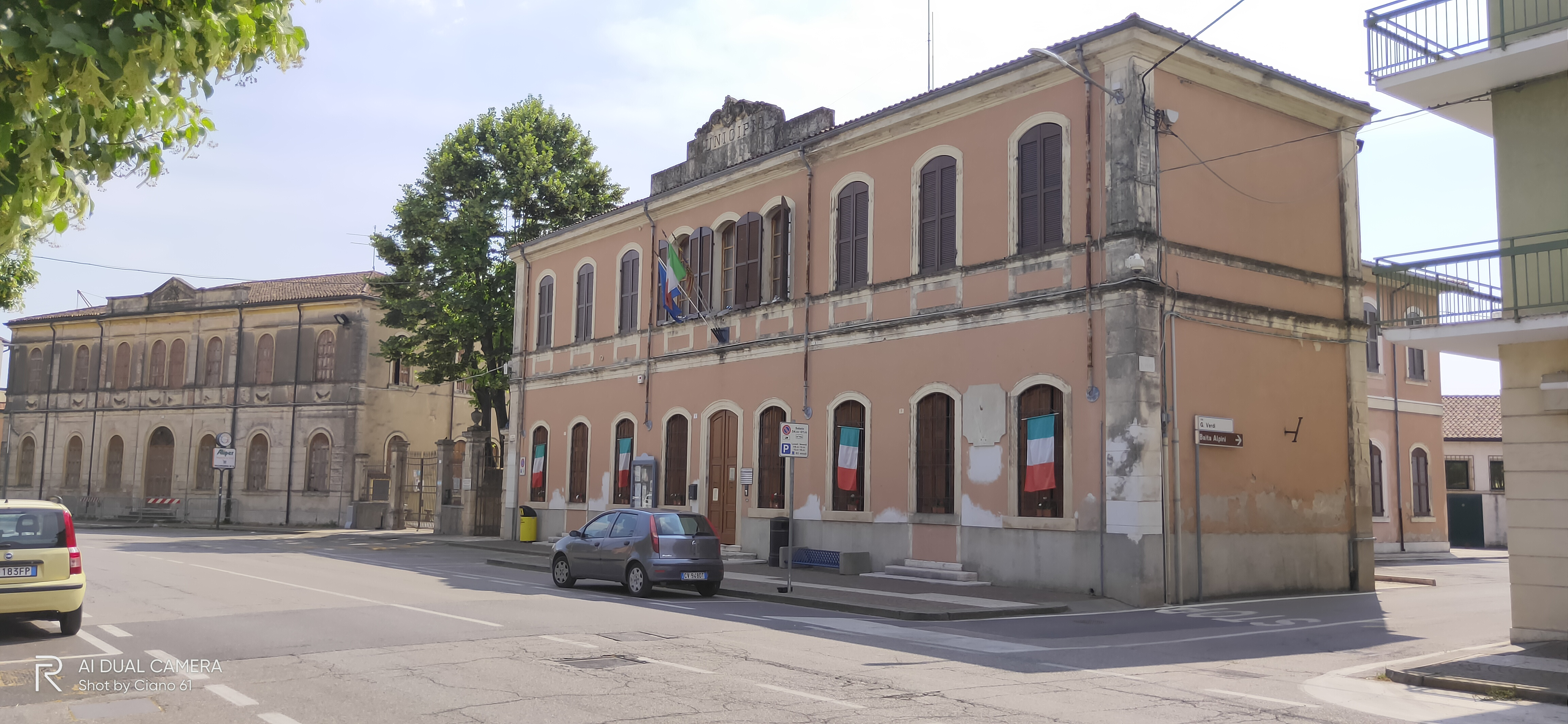

- Location within Italy Location within Veneto
- Coordinates: 45°20′50″N 10°52′50″E
- Country: Italy
- Region: Veneto
- Province: Verona (VR)

Area
  - Total: 18.53 km^{2} (7.15 sq mi)

Population (Dec. 2004)
  - Total: 6,921
  - Density: 373.5/km^{2} (967.4/sq mi)
- Demonym: Poveglianesi
- Time zone: UTC+1 (CET)
  - Summer (DST): UTC+2 (CEST)
- Postal code: 37064
- Dialing code: 045

Povegliano Veronese (Venetian: Pojan) is a comune (municipality) in the Province of Verona in the Italian region Veneto, located about 110 kilometres (68 mi) west of Venice and about 5 kilometres (3 mi) from the Catullo Airport (Verona's Airport).

== Demographic evolution ==
Historical population

Year	Pop.	±%
1861	?	—
1871	1,970	—
1881	2,101	+6.6%
1901	2,514	+19.7%
1911	2,795	+11.2%

Year	Pop.	±%
1921	3,150	+12.7%
1931	3,485	+10.6%
1936	3,672	+5.4%
1951	4,089	+11.4%
1961	4,137	+1.2%

Year	Pop.	±%
1971	4,334	+4.8%
1981	5,262	+21.4%
1991	5,709	+8.5%
2001	6,567	+15.0%

Source: Data from ISTAT

== Twin towns ==
Povegliano Veronese is twinned with:

- Ockenheim, Germany
- La Concepcion, Ecuador
