= Wilsecker =

- Municipality
- Coat of arms

- Location of Wilsecker within Eifelkreis Bitburg-Prüm district
- Interactive map of Wilsecker
- Location within Germany Location within Rhineland-Palatinate
- Coordinates: 50°01′39″N 6°35′00″E
- Country: Germany
- State: Rhineland-Palatinate
- District: Eifelkreis Bitburg-Prüm
- Municipal assoc.: Bitburger Land

Government
  - Mayor (2019–24): Marlene Burggraf

Area
  - Total: 4.53 km^{2} (1.75 sq mi)
- Elevation: 339 m (1,112 ft)

Population (2025-12-31)
  - Total: 179
  - Density: 39.5/km^{2} (102/sq mi)
- Time zone: UTC+01:00 (CET)
  - Summer (DST): UTC+02:00 (CEST)
- Postal codes: 54655
- Dialling codes: 06563
- Vehicle registration: BIT
- Website: www.wilsecker.de

Wilsecker is a municipality in the district of Bitburg-Prüm, in Rhineland-Palatinate, western Germany.

Wilsecker is a small town of approximately 200 inhabitants, close to the border of Luxembourg. Wilsecker is host to a respectively high percentage of American citizens as it is a very affordable town which is conveniently located right in between Spangdahlem Air Force Base and Bitburg city, which is known for its famous beer from the Bitburger brewery and its American military facilities.

== History ==
The town's name derives from its Latin toponym, villa sacra, which means 'holy town'. The reason for this name was an early church which arose from a Roman temple. In the High Middle Ages Wilsecker was a possession of the Abbey of Prüm. From the Thirty Years' War (1618–1648) until the time of the Kingdom of Prussia (1918) Wilsecker was administrated by the municipality of Kyllburg.

== Partnerships ==
Since 2007 Wilsecker has had a partnership with the 52 EMS Armament Flight Unit of Spangdahlem Airbase. The desire for a partnership was requested by the Americans as an effort to work closely with the local community and point out the typical German small-town lifestyle to American troops.

== Population ==
Population statistics for Wilsecker:

- 1815 – 196
- 1835 – 237
- 1871 – 258
- 1905 – 221
- 1939 – 230
- 1950 – 205
- 1961 – 193
- 1965 – 205
- 1970 – 220
- 1975 – 192
- 1980 – 180
- 1985 – 174
- 1987 – 184
- 1990 – 178
- 1995 – 184
- 2000 – 200
- 2005 – 194

Source of data: Statistic State office of Rhineland-Palatinate

== Politics ==
The Municipal Council of Wilsecker consists of six elected members and the mayor as chairman.

== Church ==
Today's church is consecrated to Saint Nicholas and was inaugurated in 1862. A statue of Saint Nicholas is standing on the altar. This altar came from the church of Badem in 1907.

== Traditions ==
=== Klappern ===
The children from Wilsecker congregate during Holy Week to celebrate an old tradition which is called klappern. The children use wooden instruments to replace the missing sound of the church bells from Good Friday to Holy Saturday. On Easter Day they go from door to door to collect Easter eggs.

=== Daida's BBQ ===
Daida's BBQ is one of the local events that attracts Americans and Germans alike and ensures a deep and fraternal alliance between American and German inhabitants of this small German town. This event takes place at irregular intervals.

=== Horse blessing ===
The horse blessing is an annual event where horsemen ride their horses to town. The horses are then blessed there by a Catholic priest.
