= Welzbach (Rhine) =

River in Germany

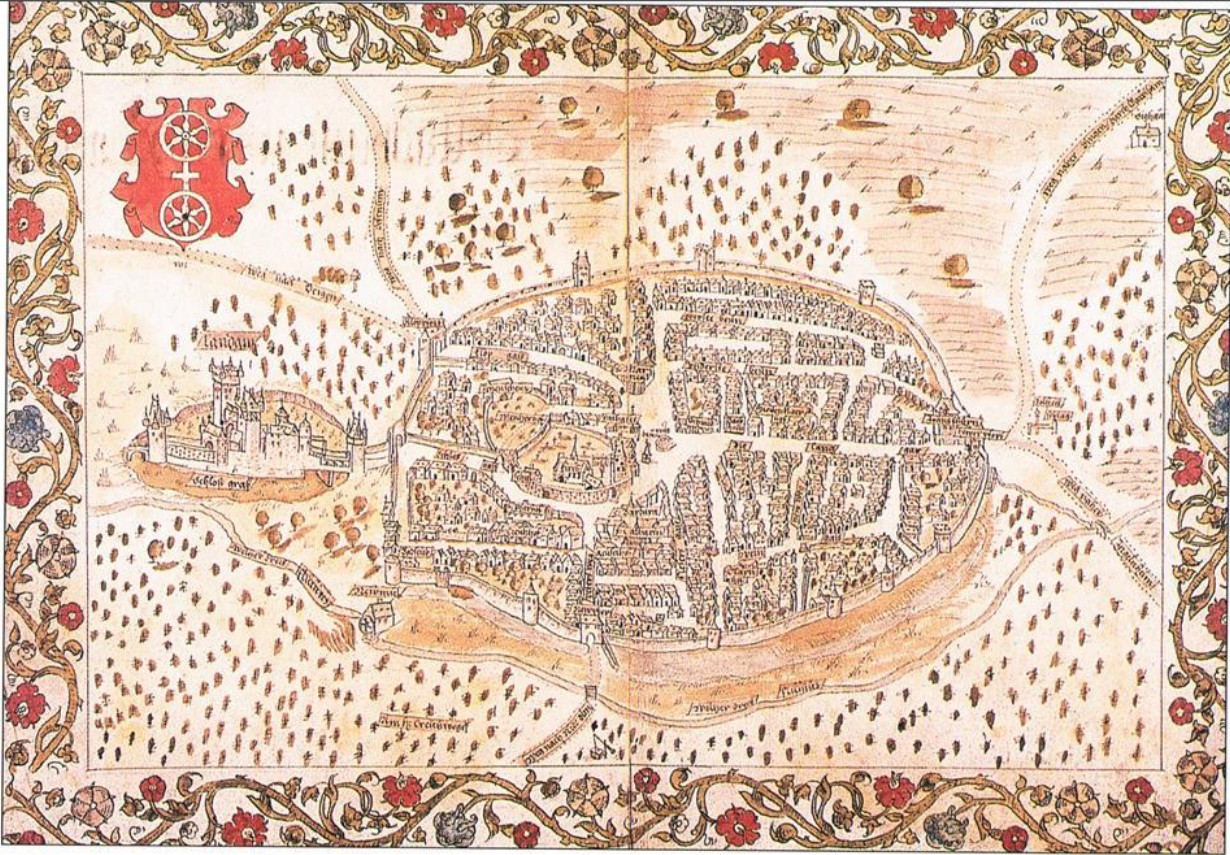
- Map of Gau-Algesheim from 1577, the Welzbach is shown below the town

Location
- Country: Germany
- State: Rhineland-Palatinate

Physical characteristics
- Mouth: Rhine
  - coordinates: 49°58′34″N 7°58′48″E
- Length: 12.6 km (7.8 mi)

Basin features
- Progression: Rhine→ North Sea

Welzbach is a river of Rhineland-Palatinate, Germany. It is a left tributary of the Rhine near Gau-Algesheim.

== See also ==
- List of rivers of Rhineland-Palatinate
