= Gau-Algesheim =

- Town
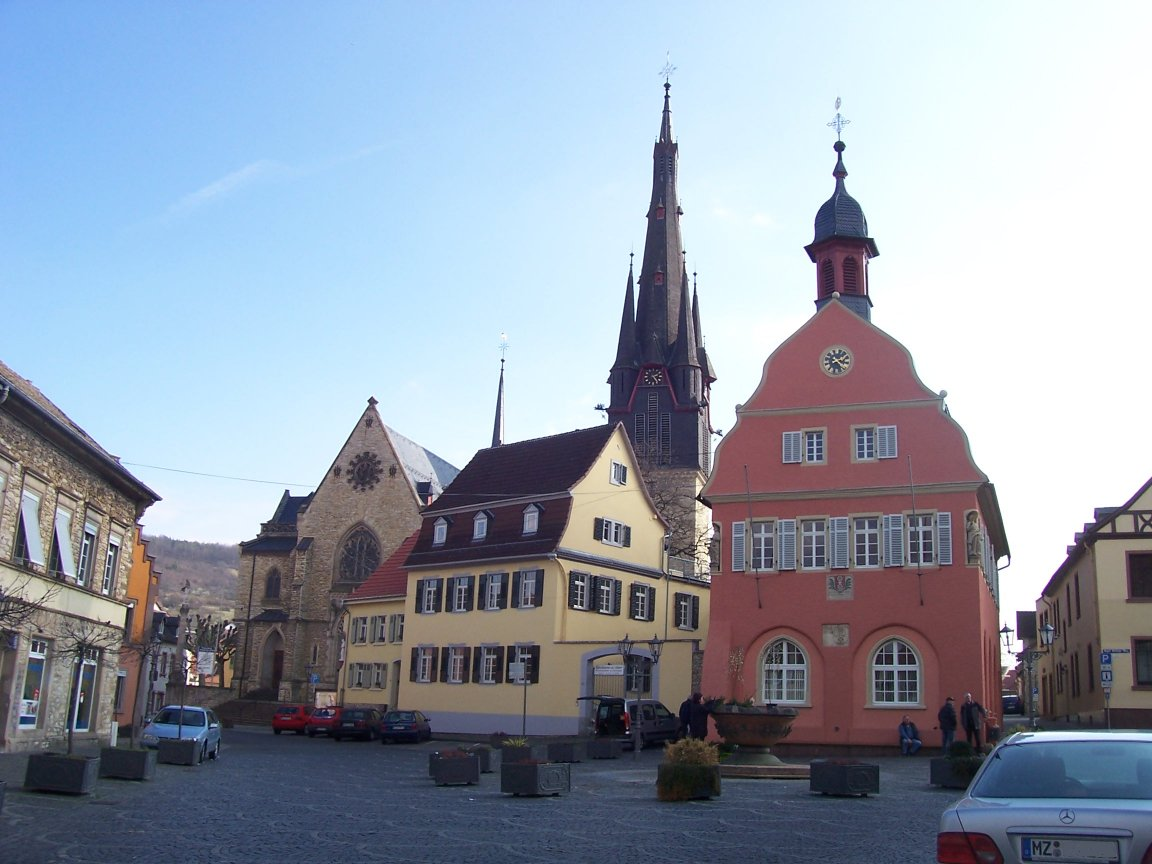
- View of the Town Hall in Gau-Algesheim

- Coat of arms

- Location of Gau-Algesheim within Mainz-Bingen district
- Interactive map of Gau-Algesheim
- Location within Germany Location within Rhineland-Palatinate
- Coordinates: 49°57′N 8°01′E
- Country: Germany
- State: Rhineland-Palatinate
- District: Mainz-Bingen
- Municipal assoc.: Gau-Algesheim
- Subdivisions: 2

Government
  - Mayor (2024–29): Michael König (CDU)

Area
  - Total: 13.99 km^{2} (5.40 sq mi)
- Elevation: 121 m (397 ft)

Population (2025-12-31)
  - Total: 6,585
  - Density: 470.7/km^{2} (1,219/sq mi)
- Time zone: UTC+01:00 (CET)
  - Summer (DST): UTC+02:00 (CEST)
- Postal codes: 55435
- Dialling codes: 06725
- Vehicle registration: MZ
- Website: www.gau-algesheim.de

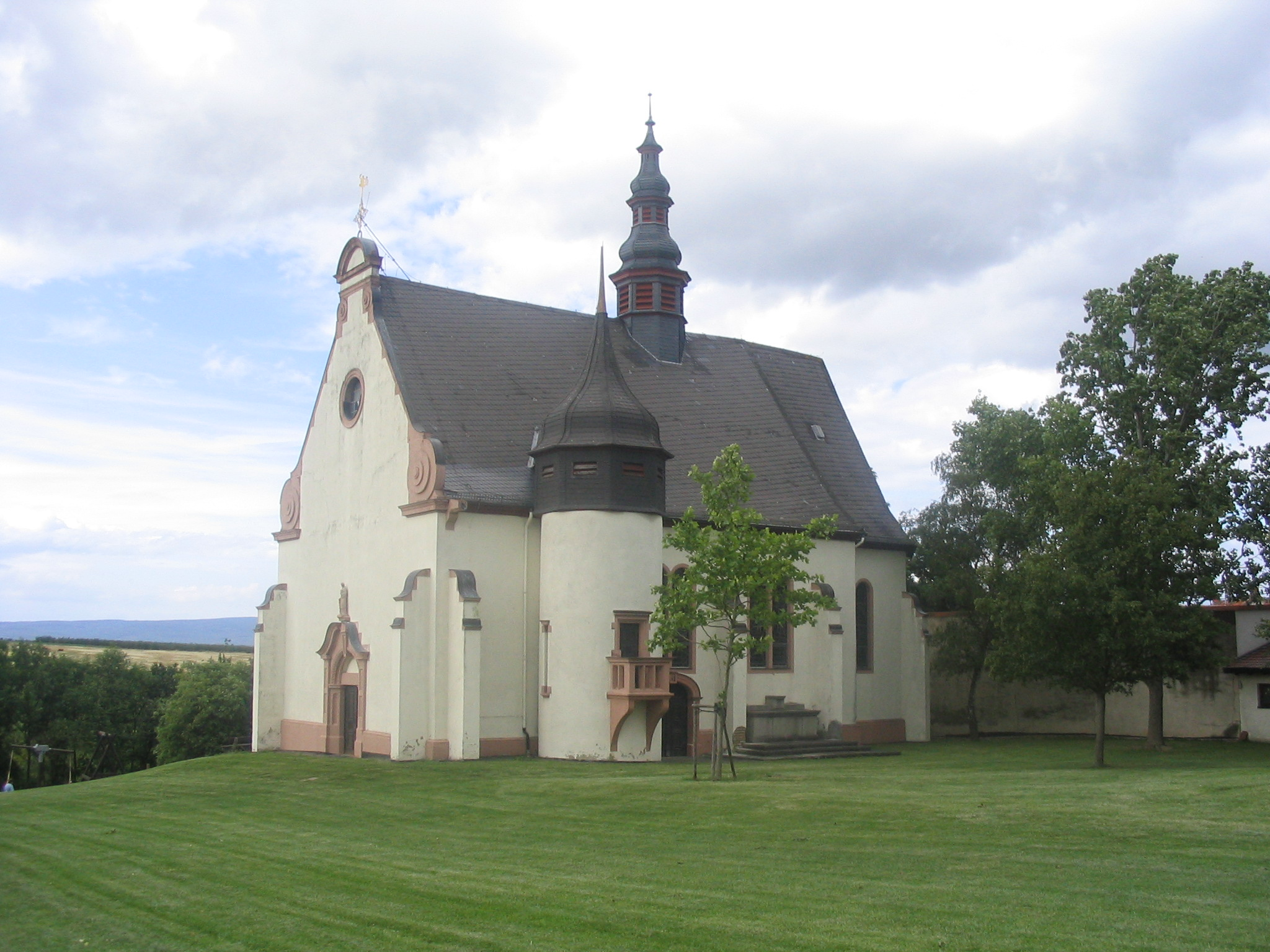
Chapel on the Laurenziberg

Gau-Algesheim (German pronunciation: [ɡaʊ ˈʔalɡəshaɪm]) is a town in the Mainz-Bingen district in Rhineland-Palatinate, Germany. It is the seat of the Verbandsgemeinde of Gau-Algesheim, a kind of collective municipality.

== Geography ==
=== Location ===
Gau-Algesheim lies roughly 20 km west of Mainz and just under 3 km away from the Rhine on the edge of the Ingelheimer Rheinebene (“Ingelheim Rhine Plain”) on the terraces at the Rhenish Hesse West Plateau, into whose varied soil structure the “Geo-Ecological Teaching Path” on the Westerberg slopes allows a glimpse. Through the municipal area flows the Welzbach.

=== Neighbouring municipalities ===
Clockwise from the north, these are Ingelheim, Appenheim, Ockenheim and Bingen.

=== Constituent communities ===
Gau-Algesheim's Stadtteile are Gau-Algesheim and Laurenziberg.

== History ==
In Roman times this was a border area, but already by the Middle Ages it had grown into part of the Holy Roman Empire’s heartland.

Before the town’s first documentary mention in the Lorsch codex in 766, Alagastesheim may already have had more than two centuries of history behind it. The documents about Alagastesheim and Bergen (Laurenziberg) in the lists of holdings from the Lorsch and Fulda Abbeys beginning in 766-767 allow inferences about cropraising, livestock raising, winegrowing, fruitgrowing and individual inhabitants’ wealth. Gau-Algesheim came to the fore in history along with all the other places in the Binger Land with the ″Verona Donation″ on 14 June 983, when Emperor Otto II donated to his Archchancellor Willigis in Verona the town of Bingen and the land “that stretches this side of the Rhine from the bridge over the Selzbach as far as Heimbach, beyond the Rhine but from the spot where the Elzbächlein (a small stream) flows into the same, as far as the little village of Caub”.

=== Middle Ages ===
Under financial pressure, Gau-Algesheim was pledged to the Baden Margraves. The Margrave himself then further pledged it in 1461, and the villages of Dromersheim, Gau-Bickelheim, Ockenheim, Windesheim, Kempten, Münster and Büdesheim to the financially strong Count Philipp I, Count of Katzenelnbogen. Under him, the term Wein vom Gau, meaning “Wine from the Gau (or Region)”, was coined. As Philipp died in 1479 without a male heir, Gau-Algesheim ended up involved in the Katzenelnbogen succession dispute.

“Living well under the crozier” was not something that held true at all times. Often domestic or foreign armies would sweep through the town bringing war's attendant burdens and havoc, for instance, in 1248 during the struggles between Emperor Frederick II's and King William II's troops, in 1553 in the war of Protestant princely opposition to Emperor Charles V, in 1631 when Swedish King Gustav II Adolf's troops burnt much of the town down, or 1690, 1733 and 1792, when French soldiers burnt or seized Gau-Algesheim.

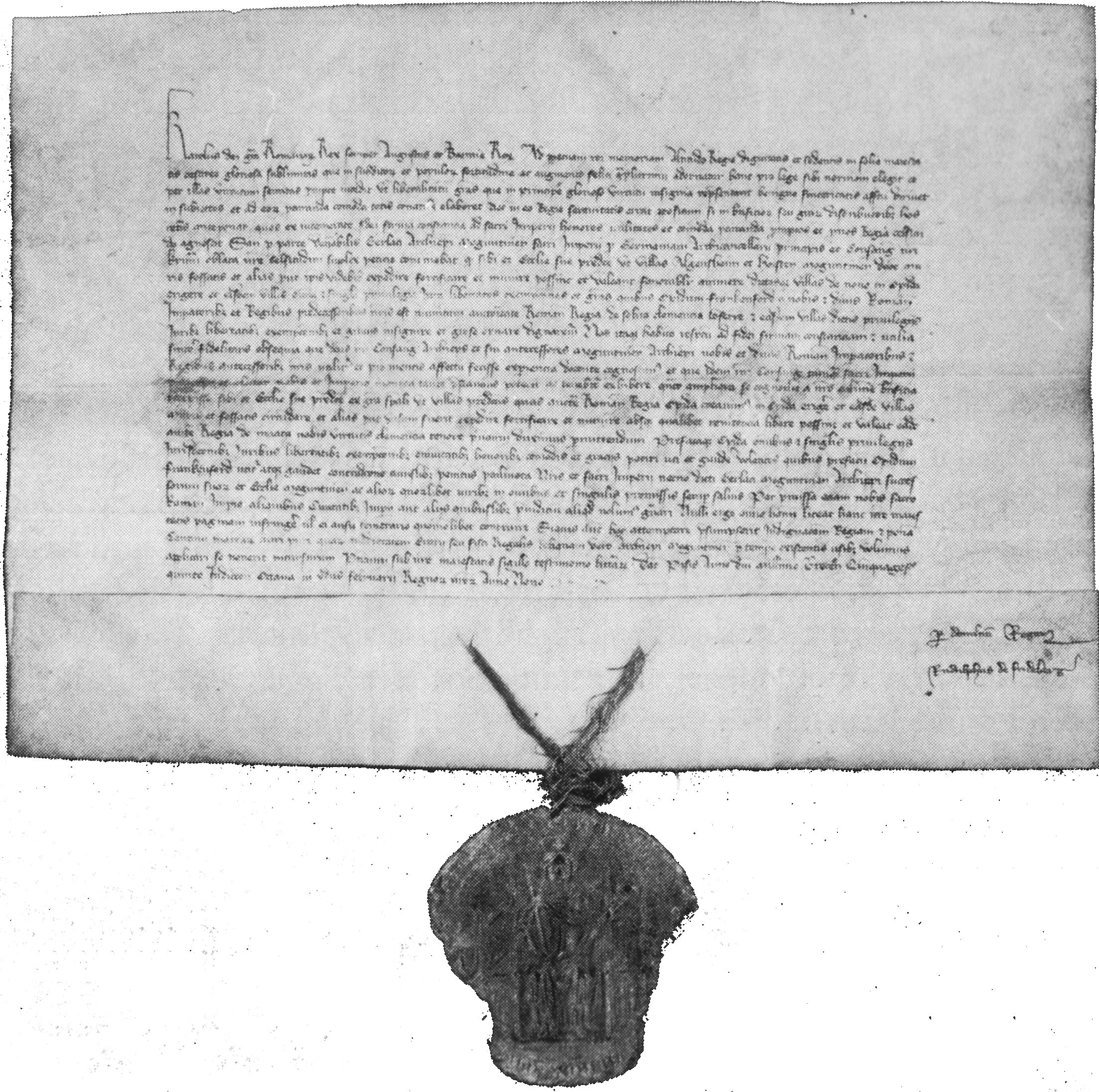
Town Charter from 11 February 1355 for the villages of Algensheim and Hoisten (Höchst am Main)

Even the two conferrals of town rights, the one in 1332 at Elector of Mainz Baldwin of Luxembourg's request by Emperor Louis the Bavarian and the one in 1355 by King Charles IV in support of the Archbishop of Mainz, were primarily motivated by political and military considerations and were only secondarily meant to further the towsfolk's security and well-being. Nevertheless, there arose a weekly market and a wine market along with a healthy number of craftsmen and businessmen with the urban life then creating supply and demand for regular markets.

At the same time, a great many financial pledges and the mention of a Jewish head tax point to rather a high demand for cash and business. Eventually, for over 400 years, from the latter half of the 14th century until the end of the Old Empire, there arose the Amt of Algesheim under the governance of Amtmänner, Landschreiber, Amtskeller (all titles for various officials) and Schultheißen (roughly “sheriffs”) of the Mainz overlords.

The overlords’ might, already demonstrated in the municipal law of 15 July 1417, was keenly felt by Gau-Algesheim when Elector Albrecht of Brandenburg put an end to efforts to secure self-administration for the town by issuing the state law of 3 January 1527 because the town had taken part in the “Rheingau Uprising” in 1525, and released “unser stadt Algeßheym von unserm landt dem Ringgaw” (“our town Algesheim from our land, the Rheingau”, in archaic German), cutting the town off from the Rheingau, supposedly in perpetuity. Alongside this, pictures of the town, cadastral plans and village descriptions from cartographer Gottfried Mascop's 1577 atlas, the 1590 and 1668 village descriptions and the 1595 Police Law give impressions of the extent to which, and within what bounds of administrative structures the small farming town's social and economic life, and also the townsfolk's self-awareness and self-will developed.

=== French Revolution and the years that followed ===
From 1797 to 1815, Gau-Algesheim, along with the whole of the territory on the Rhine's left bank, belonged to the French Republic or the Napoleonic Empire. In the person of scientist, engineer and officer Rudolf Eickemeyer, who was from 1811 to 1813 and again from 1814 to 1815 the maire and from 1815 to 1822 the Bürgermeister (“mayor” in French and German respectively), Gau-Algesheim had a personal continuity from the time of French rule on into Hessian times. Eickemeyer gave the community a modern shape by reforming fire control, restructuring finances, expanding the town's building work, and furthering schooling and agriculture.

The town's growing importance found expression in the institution of a notary's office (1809), the building of the Ludwigsbahn (Mainz-Bingen railway) with a station (1859), the building of a postal depot (1861) out of which grew postal shipping and a post office, and in Georg Presser's (1862) and the Avenarius Brothers’ (1869) first factories.

The traces left in Gau-Algesheim by the Catholic priest Peter Koser from 1869 to 1890 are still apparent today. The Rheinischer Volksbote (“Rhenish Messenger”), first published by the printer Reidel in 1869 and under Father Koser's editorship, was for decades a regionally important organ of the Catholic Centre Party. A teacher preparation institute (an institution that prepared students for teacher's college), known to locals as the Lateinschul (“Latin School”) or the Aljesemer Hochschul (“Algesheim College”, in dialectal German), a childcare centre, a credit and savings union on a coöperative basis, a farmers’ and consumers’ association, and not least of all the newly built Catholic parish church and the establishment of church music in 1888 confirm Peter Koser's religious and sociopolitical contributions in a time of political and ideological struggles.

=== Third Reich ===
In the 5 March 1933 Reichstag elections, the town's Catholic character showed itself once again with the Centre Party holding its own as the strongest party with 46.6% of the vote, against the National Socialists with 26.6%. The SPD and the Communists trailed rather badly with 16.2% and 6.9% respectively. After the dissolution or banning of democratic political parties and ecclesiastical associations, and the Gleichschaltung of clubs, opponents of National Socialism were progressively isolated and intimidated. In the context of the dispute over the Reichskonkordat between the German Empire and the Roman Curia, members of the Centre, and also two Social Democrats, were defamed as separatists and traitors to the Fatherland, resulting in their being delivered to Osthofen Concentration Camp. When the Second World War ended, the roughly 80 dead and missing from the First World War were joined by a further 200 or so dead, murdered and missing.

=== Since the war ===
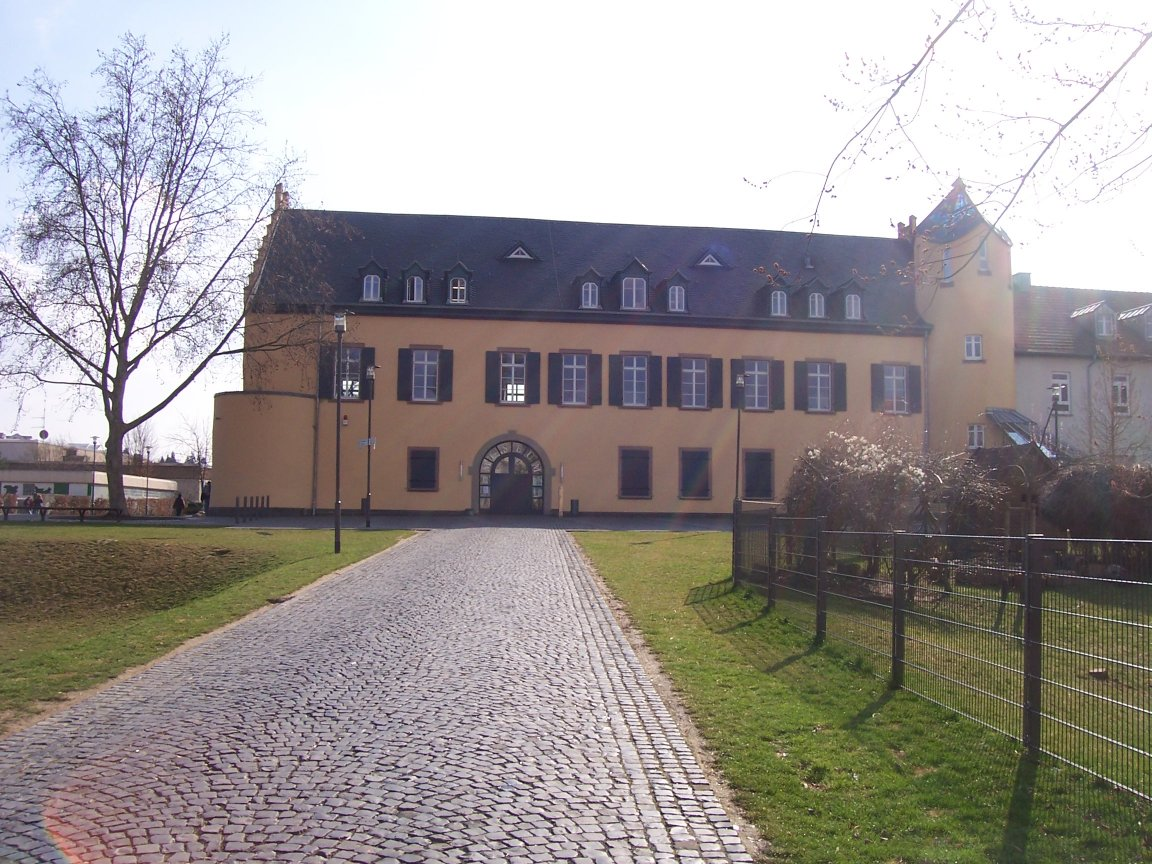
Schloss Ardeck

The 600th anniversary of Gau-Algesheim's elevation to town in 1355 was recalled by a days-long festival in the summer of 1955, which formed the high point, and indeed the completion of the phase of reconstruction and restoration of traditional structures. Within a few years, the roadbridge (Bundesstraße 41) over the railway line (1957), the cycling sport hall (1960), the new Catholic kindergarten (1961) and the expansion of the Albertus-Hospital (1962) and the primary school (1963) changed the town's face. Once the town administration had moved from the Town Hall on the marketplace to Schloss Ardeck (castle) in 1969, the results of administrative reform made themselves known, among which were the Regierungsbezirk of Rheinhessen-Pfalz (1968), the Mainz-Bingen district (1969) and the Verbandsgemeinde of Gau-Algesheim (1972) as well as the new Schloss-Ardeck-Grundschule (primary school, 1979), the Schloss-Ardeck-Sporthalle (1981) and the Christian Erbach Regional School (2003).

Life in the many clubs and the conviviality are anchored in an historical foundation: in the traditional festivals, the pilgrimage on the Laurenziberg on the Sunday after Saint Lawrence's Day (10 August), the kermis (church consecration festival, locally known as the Kerb) around Assumption Day (15 August), the Young Wine Festival on the second weekend in October and the Christmas Market on the first Sunday in Advent.

== Politics ==
=== Town partnerships ===
- Saulieu, Côte-d'Or, France
- Caprino Veronese, Province of Verona, Veneto, Italy
- (United States) Redford, Michigan, USA
- (Germany) Neudietendorf, Gotha district, Thuringia
- (Germany) Erfurt-Stotternheim, Thuringia

The partnerships began in 1964 with Saulieu. After both places’ mayors had met, a group of Catholic youths (from the Katholische Junge Gemeinde) travelled to a campground in Burgundy. The links with Caprino Veronese, Redford, Neudietendorf and Stotternheim, too, began with contacts by individual persons or groups before there was ever official contact, much less formal ties. For its dedication to nurturing town partnerships, Gau-Algesheim was awarded the Europe Diploma in 1994 by the Council of Europe, and the European Flag of Honour in 1995.

In 2002, the many stresses on the town and its inhabitants were greatly eased by state recognition of the town as a Tourism Municipality (Fremdenverkehrsgemeinde).

=== Coat of arms ===
The town's arms might be described thus: Gules a cross crosslet pattée couped top and bottom by a wheel in each of chief and base spoked of six lozengy argent.

The arms are derived from those borne by Mainz, which is explained by an historical connection. Gau-Algesheim was an Archbishopric of Mainz holding until 1803. The arms were conferred in 1853, at least officially. The wheel-and-cross composition had, however, been appearing in town seals since at least the 15th century.

== Economy and infrastructure ==
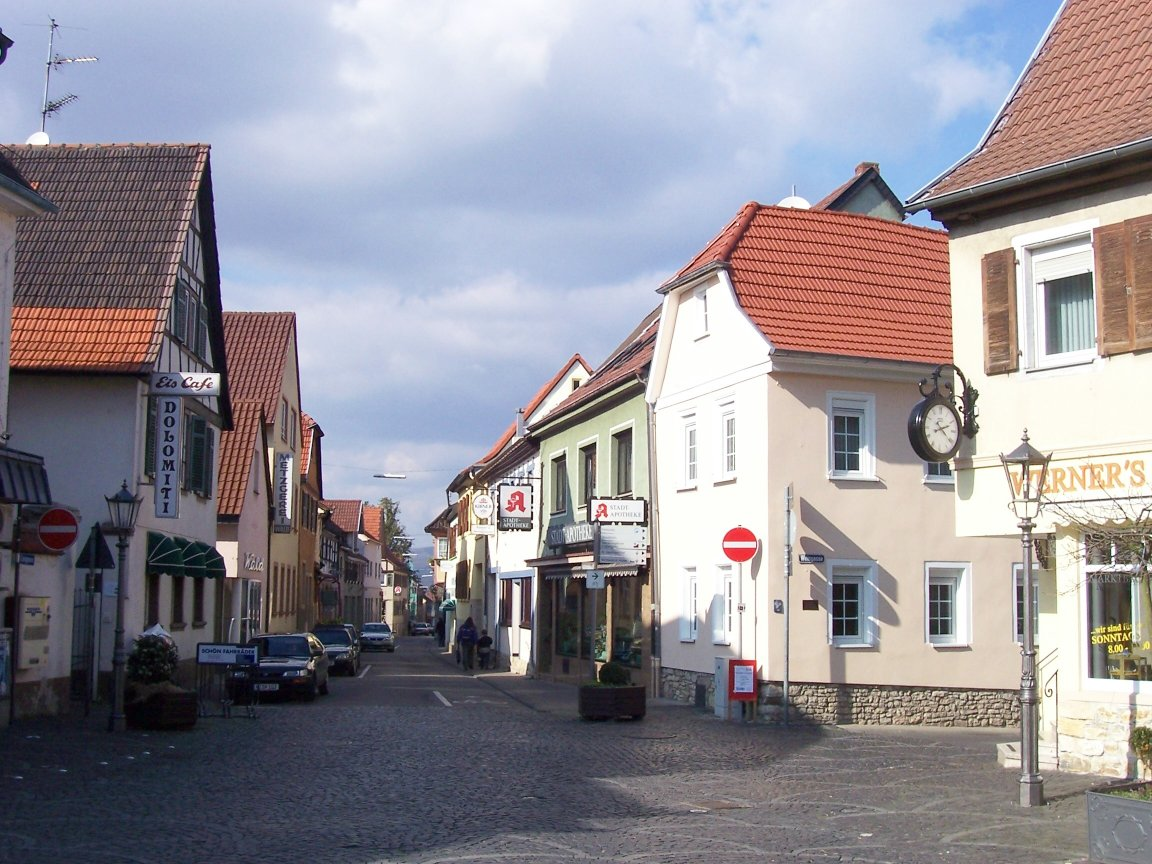
Langgasse

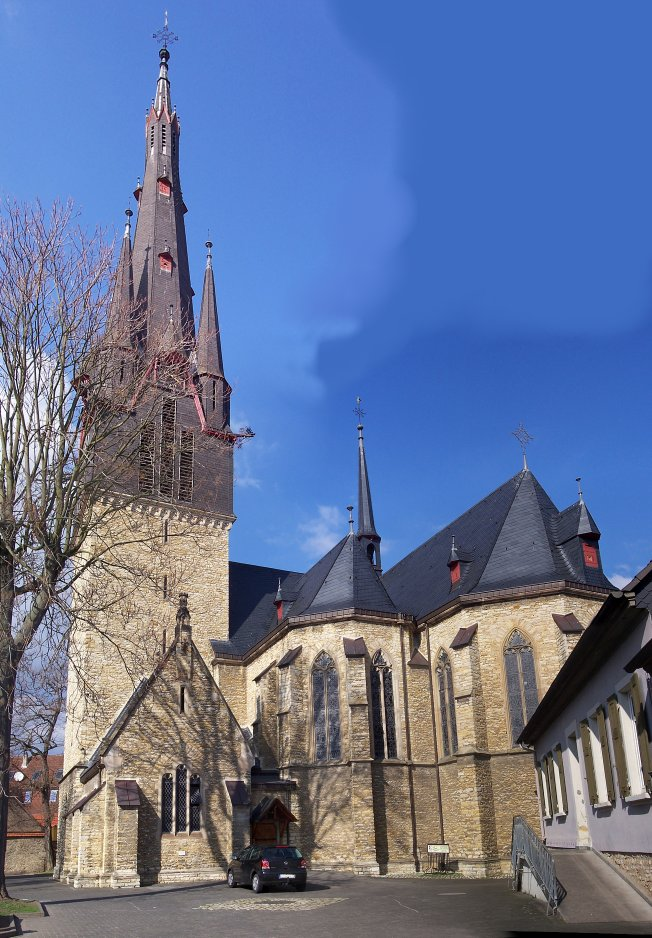
Parish church

The town lies in a favourable location for transport on the Left Rhine railway towards Frankfurt, Koblenz, and Mainz and the line to Bad Kreuznach, which connects to the Nahe Valley line to Saarbrücken and on Autobahn A 60. The town's landmarks are the ensemble of the Catholic parish church, the Town Hall, townsmen's houses and marketplace, Schloss Ardeck (castle), the Graulturm (tower) and the Evangelical church.

Schloss Ardeck has housed since 2002 the Rhenish Hesse Bicycle Museum. It is open every Sunday and holiday from 11:00 to 17:00 from Easter to the Young Wine Festival on the second weekend in October.

Since late 2005, the new regional “Rheinwelle” adventure pool on Landesstraße (State Road) 419 within Gau-Algesheim town limits has been open. It is run jointly by Gau-Algesheim, Ingelheim and Bingen.

== Notable people ==
- Christian Erbach, (around 1570 – 1635), organist and composer
- Rudolf Eickemeyer (1753–1825), mayor of Gau-Algesheim, scientist, soldier
- Heinrich Vogt (1890–1968), astronomer and theoretical astrophysicist
- Winfried Hassemer (1940–2014), criminal law scientist, vice-president of the Federal Constitutional Court of Germany
