= Kinheim, Germany =

Kinheim
- Municipality
- Location of Kinheim within Bernkastel-Wittlich district
- Interactive map of Kinheim
- Location within Germany Location within Rhineland-Palatinate
- Coordinates: 49°58′24″N 7°3′13″E
- Country: Germany
- State: Rhineland-Palatinate
- District: Bernkastel-Wittlich
- Municipal assoc.: Traben-Trarbach
- Subdivisions: 2

Government
  - Mayor (2019–24): Walter Klink (CDU)

Area
  - Total: 9.07 km^{2} (3.50 sq mi)
- Elevation: 110 m (360 ft)

Population (2025-12-31)
  - Total: 746
  - Density: 82.2/km^{2} (213/sq mi)
- Time zone: UTC+01:00 (CET)
  - Summer (DST): UTC+02:00 (CEST)
- Postal codes: 54538
- Dialling codes: 06532
- Vehicle registration: WIL
- Website: www.kinheim.de

Kinheim is an Ortsgemeinde – a municipality belonging to a Verbandsgemeinde, a kind of collective municipality – in the Bernkastel-Wittlich district in Rhineland-Palatinate, Germany.

== Geography ==
=== Location ===
The municipality lies on the Middle Moselle’s left bank at Moselle kilometre 116. The outlying centre of Kindel lies on the right bank. The two centres are linked with each other by a bridge across the Moselle. The outlying centre of Sengwald is nestled in the Alf valley between Kinderbeuern and the settlement of Ürziger Bahnhof (“Ürzig Railway Station”). Just under half the municipal area is wooded. Kinheim belongs to the Verbandsgemeinde of Traben-Trarbach.

=== Climate ===
Yearly precipitation in Kinheim amounts to 706 mm, falling into middle third of the precipitation chart for all Germany. At 41% of the German Weather Service’s weather stations, lower figures are recorded. The driest month is February. The most rainfall comes in June. In that month, precipitation is 1.6 times what it is in February. Precipitation varies only minimally and is spread out quite evenly throughout the year. At only 3% of the weather stations are lower seasonal swings recorded.

=== Neighbouring municipalities ===
Kinheim borders in the north on the municipality of Kinderbeuern, in the northeast on the municipality of Bengel, in the east on the municipality of Kröv, in the southeast on the town of Traben-Trarbach, in the southwest on the municipality of Lösnich, in the west on the municipality of Ürzig, and in the northwest on the municipality of Bausendorf.

== History ==
In 1161, the placename Kinheim had its first documentary mention. The name’s meaning is uncertain. It is believed that the determiner Ken is of pre-Roman origin. The root word Heim suggests that Kinheim was an early Frankish settlement. The outlying centre of Kindel across the river was named as early as 1069 as Kennelle, and was later called Kinelle (1304) or Kinnel (1404). Kindel is surely a daughter settlement of Kinheim, for Kennelle means “little Kindel”. Furthermore, Kinheim had an outlying centre in the Alf valley, today’s Kinderbeuern (1296: Kynheymerbüren), which until sometime about 1740 was politically united with the municipality of Kinheim.

Beginning in 1794, XXX lay under French rule as part of the Département de Rhin-et-Moselle (Rhein-Mosel-Département in German). In 1814 it was assigned to the Kingdom of Prussia at the Congress of Vienna. Since 1946, it has been part of the then newly founded state of Rhineland-Palatinate.

In the outlying centre of Kindel, the remnants of a Celtic-Roman estate from the 3rd century were unearthed. This also entailed the discovery of a high relief of the hammer god Sucellus. This archaeological find is said to be the oldest evidence of winegrowing on the Moselle.

== Politics ==
=== Municipal council ===
The council is made up of 12 council members, who were elected by majority vote at the municipal election held on 7 June 2009, and the honorary mayor as chairman.

=== Coat of arms ===
The municipality’s arms might be described thus: Or an eagle bicapitate displayed sable armed and langued gules, on his breast an inescutcheon chequy of sixteen argent and gules, between the heads a royal crown proper.

=== Town partnerships ===
Kinheim fosters partnerships with the following places:

- Harelbeke, West Flanders, Belgium
- Ambonnay, Marne, France

== Culture and sightseeing ==
=== Clubs ===
The clubs in Kinheim-Kindel include a gymnastic and sport club, a Winzerkapelle (“winemakers’ orchestra”), a volunteer fire brigade, the village youth club and a Carnival club. These clubs organize and stage several events over the year.

== Economy and infrastructure ==
- The municipality is characterized by winegrowing and tourism. Thriving in roughly 120 ha of vineyards are wine grapes in the locations of Rosenberg, Hubertuslay and Römerhang (“Romans’ Slope”). All three locations belong to the winemaking appellation – Großlage – of Schwarzlay and to the winegrowing domain of Bernkastel in the Mosel wine region.
- Kinheim is a state-recognized recreational municipality (Erholungsort).
- Running through the municipality is Bundesstraße 53. To the west runs the Autobahn A 1. Access thereto is gained through the Wittlich-Mitte interchange about 15 km away. After the completion of the High Moselle Crossing (Hochmoselübergang – a highway link whose centrepiece will be a long, high bridge over the Moselle), the four-lane Bundesstraße 50 will be reachable through the Erden-Lösnich interchange about 4 km away beginning in 2016, shortening the travelling time to the A 61 at the Rheinböllen interchange from the roughly 50 minutes that it takes now to an expected 40 minutes or so.
- In nearby Ürzig is a railway station on the Koblenz-Trier railway line.

== Famous people ==
=== Sons and daughters of the town ===
- Helmut Mathy (1934–2008), German historian and politician
- Alfred Beth (1940– ), German politician and administrative jurist; state minister for environment and health for Rhineland-Palatinate (1988-1991)
- Angelina Baum (2000- )
