= Kinderbeuern =

- Municipality
- Location of Kinderbeuern within Bernkastel-Wittlich district
- Interactive map of Kinderbeuern
- Location within Germany Location within Rhineland-Palatinate
- Coordinates: 50°0′33.5″N 7°1′24.45″E
- Country: Germany
- State: Rhineland-Palatinate
- District: Bernkastel-Wittlich
- Municipal assoc.: Traben-Trarbach
- Subdivisions: 2

Government
  - Mayor (2019–24): Rainer Schwind

Area
  - Total: 5.56 km^{2} (2.15 sq mi)
- Elevation: 168 m (551 ft)

Population (2025-12-31)
  - Total: 994
  - Density: 179/km^{2} (463/sq mi)
- Time zone: UTC+01:00 (CET)
  - Summer (DST): UTC+02:00 (CEST)
- Postal codes: 54538
- Dialling codes: 06532
- Vehicle registration: WIL

Kinderbeuern (also known locally as Kinderbeuern-Hetzhof) is an Ortsgemeinde – a municipality belonging to a Verbandsgemeinde, a kind of collective municipality – in the Bernkastel-Wittlich district in Rhineland-Palatinate, Germany.

== Geography ==
=== Location ===
Kinderbeuern lies in the Alf valley at the foot of the Kondelwald, a forested hill region. The outlying centre of Hetzhof lies not far north on the Kammerbach. Kinderbeuern belongs to the Verbandsgemeinde of Traben-Trarbach.

=== Neighbouring municipalities ===
Kinderbeuern's neighbours in the Alf valley are Bausendorf, Bengel and Sengwald, likewise in the Alf valley, but an outlying centre of the municipality of Kinheim on the Moselle.

== History ==
Originally, Kinderbeuern (1296: Kynheymerbüren) was an outlying settlement in the Alf valley of the municipality of Kinheim on the Moselle and until 1740 was united with Kinheim Kinderbeuern had its first documentary mention in 1296. Beginning in 1794, Kinderbeuern lay under French rule. In 1814 it was assigned to the Kingdom of Prussia at the Congress of Vienna. Since 1947, it has been part of the then newly founded state of Rhineland-Palatinate.

== Politics ==
=== Municipal council ===
The council is made up of 16 council members, who were elected by proportional representation at the municipal election held on 7 June 2009, and the honorary mayor as chairman.

The municipal election held on 7 June 2009 yielded the following results:

Year	SPD	CDU	FWG	Total
2009	7	9	-	16 seats
2004	7	7	2	16 seats

=== Coat of arms ===
The municipality's arms might be described thus: Or an eagle bicapitate displayed sable armed and langued gules, on his breast the letters CR of the field, between the heads a crown of the field, in a chief of the third three crowns of the first.

== Economy and infrastructure ==
In Kinderbeuern there are one kindergarten and one primary school. Within the municipality, Bundesstraßen 421 and 49 meet. To the west runs the Autobahn A 1. In each of the neighbouring municipalities of Ürzig and Bengel is a railway station on the Koblenz-Trier railway line.
