= Hörscheid =

- Municipality
- Coat of arms

- Location of Hörscheid within Vulkaneifel district
- Interactive map of Hörscheid
- Location within Germany Location within Rhineland-Palatinate
- Coordinates: 50°13′12″N 6°52′33″E
- Country: Germany
- State: Rhineland-Palatinate
- District: Vulkaneifel
- Municipal assoc.: Daun

Government
  - Mayor (2019–24): Kurt Binz

Area
  - Total: 4.04 km^{2} (1.56 sq mi)
- Elevation: 516 m (1,693 ft)

Population (2025-12-31)
  - Total: 116
  - Density: 28.7/km^{2} (74.4/sq mi)
- Time zone: UTC+01:00 (CET)
  - Summer (DST): UTC+02:00 (CEST)
- Postal codes: 54552
- Dialling codes: 06592
- Vehicle registration: DAU

Hörscheid is an Ortsgemeinde – a municipality belonging to a Verbandsgemeinde, a kind of collective municipality – in the Vulkaneifel district in Rhineland-Palatinate, Germany. It belongs to the Verbandsgemeinde of Daun, whose seat is in the like-named town.

== Geography ==
The municipality lies in the Vulkaneifel, a part of the Eifel known for its volcanic history, geographical and geological features, and even ongoing activity today, including gases that sometimes well up from the earth.

The highest elevation in the municipal area is the Kapp, lying to the northeast, at 590 m above sea level. The village itself lies on a long ridge from which the land slopes down on either side. Falling away steeply to the north from the village towards the Hasenbach is a wooded slope; to the south are meadowlands that slope down to the Maubach. Both these brooks flow together in the west of the municipal area, whereafter the Maubach flows down to a place near Boverath where it empties into the river Lieser.

In the east of the municipal area rises the river Alf, whence it flows towards the south.

Hörscheid is a one-street village (by some definitions, a “thorpe”), but the street in question is not a through road. This is greatly valued by families with children. West of the village runs the newly built stretch of the Autobahn A 1 from Trier to Cologne. In 1982, Hörscheid was the regional winner in the contest Unser Dorf soll schöner werden (“Our village should become lovelier”).

== History ==
The area was settled as early as the New Stone Age, with Celtic stone hatchets having been found in the settlement area. The rural cadastral area Runkelhof shows traces of Roman settlement. A stone villa from the 2nd to 4th century once stood here on the Roman road from Trier to Cologne. The Romans had diverted and channelled one of the Alf's lesser sources. The aqueduct lay 1.3 m underground and ran to the neighbouring village of Darscheid, ending at a fountain, which is no longer extant.

The village's name is believed to have been derived from the Celtic word for “mountain forest” or “deer forest”, although this is uncertain. The ending —scheid points to forest clearing in the Early Middle Ages. In 1465, Hörscheid had its first documentary mention, according to which the village already existed in 1398. In the 16th century, the settlement consisted of five hearths. The village was from Frankish times part of the Amt of Daun, which as of 1354 belonged to the Electorate of Trier. Ecclesiastically, however, the whole Amt of Daun belonged to the Electorate of Cologne. The area is mainly Roman Catholic, and Hörscheid has belonged to the Parish of Darscheid since 1803. The bell at Saint Brigid's Catholic Chapel was poured in 1678, meaning that there must also have been a chapel as early as that. It was renovated in 1850. The Evangelical parish belongs to the Deaconry of Adenau.

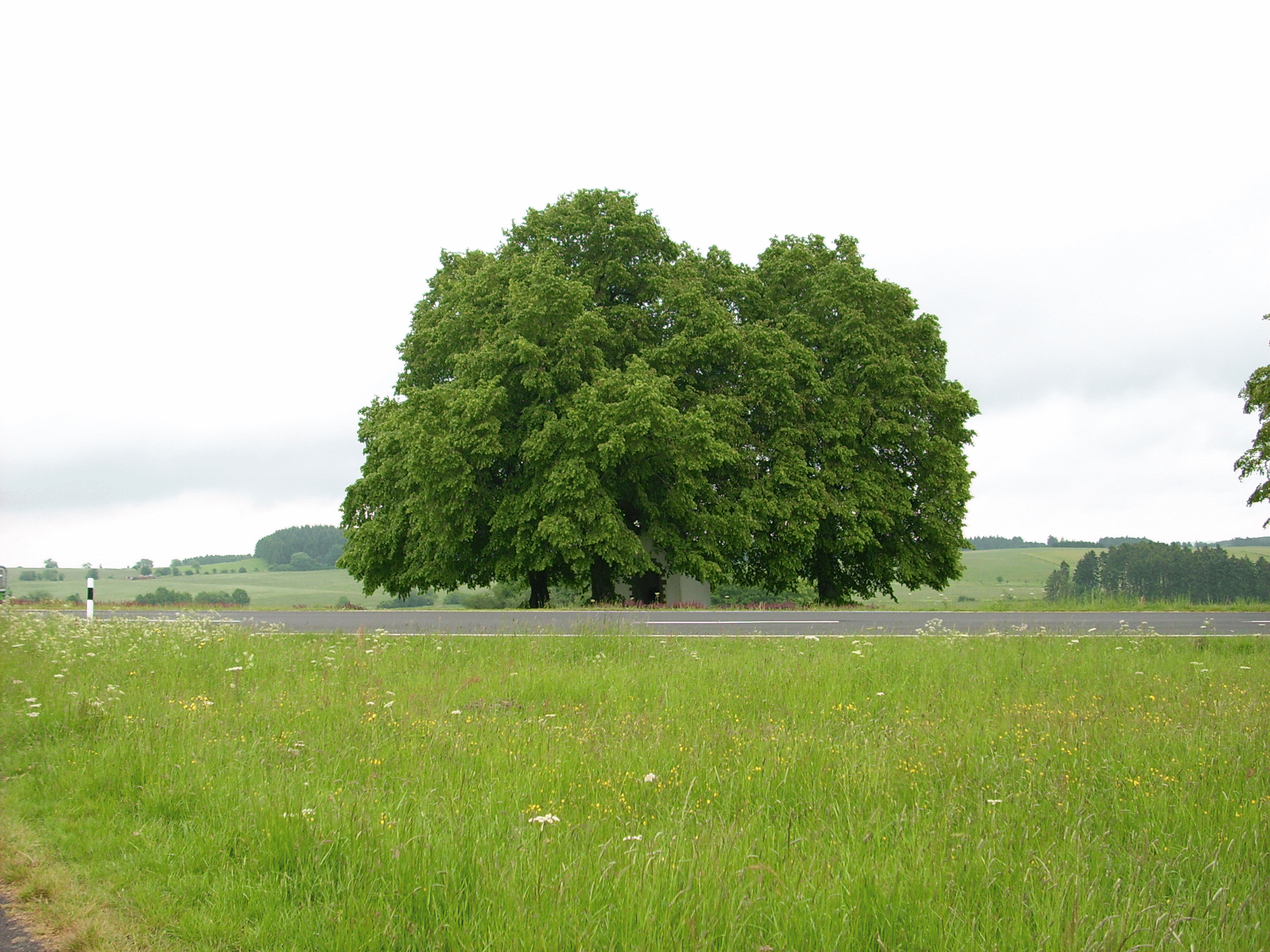
Heiligenhäuschen from the 1960s

In 1787, there was a “winter school” (Winterschule – a kind of agricultural school that grew up in response to the Industrial Revolution) in Hörscheid. The teacher at the time was Johann Peter Stoll. Later, schoolchildren went to a one-room primary school in Darscheid, which was closed in 1975. Ever since, Hörscheid schoolchildren have been attending the two-stream primary school in Mehren. A kindergarten is also available in Darscheid.

Life for Eifel dwellers was often hard owing to the rough climate and the poor soils. Owing to the great neediness in the early 19th century, 31 persons all together emigrated from Hörscheid to North America. Only beginning in 1860 could the food supply for the people be lastingly ensured by reforestation of the sparse heath and improved agricultural methods. In 1912 came the merging of fields that through inheritance had become splintered. In 1931, a central water supply was built. In 1933, a great deal of the heathland was cultivated.

== Politics ==
=== Municipal council ===
The council is made up of 6 council members, who were elected by majority vote at the municipal election held on 7 June 2009, and the honorary mayor as chairman.

=== Mayor ===
Hörscheid's mayor is Kurt Binz.

=== Coat of arms ===
The German blazon reads: In Silber ein blauer Wellenstab, vorn ein durchgehendes rotes Balkenkreuz, hinten über einem grünen Eichenblatt eine rote Flamme.

The municipality's arms might in English heraldic language be described thus: Argent a pallet wavy azure, dexter a cross gules and sinister in base an oakleaf bendwise sinister proper and in chief fire of the third.

The red cross on the silver field refers to the municipality's centuries-long history with the Electoral-Trier Amt of Daun. The wavy blue pallet (narrow vertical stripe) symbolizes the source of the river Alf. The green oakleaf refers to the interpretation of the placename as meaning “mountain forest”, and also to the harvest of oak bark for tanning in the rural cadastral area Gebrannter Berg that was once undertaken. The red flame is Saint Brigid's attribute, thus representing the municipality's patron saint.

The arms have been borne since 7 May 1991.

== Culture and sightseeing ==
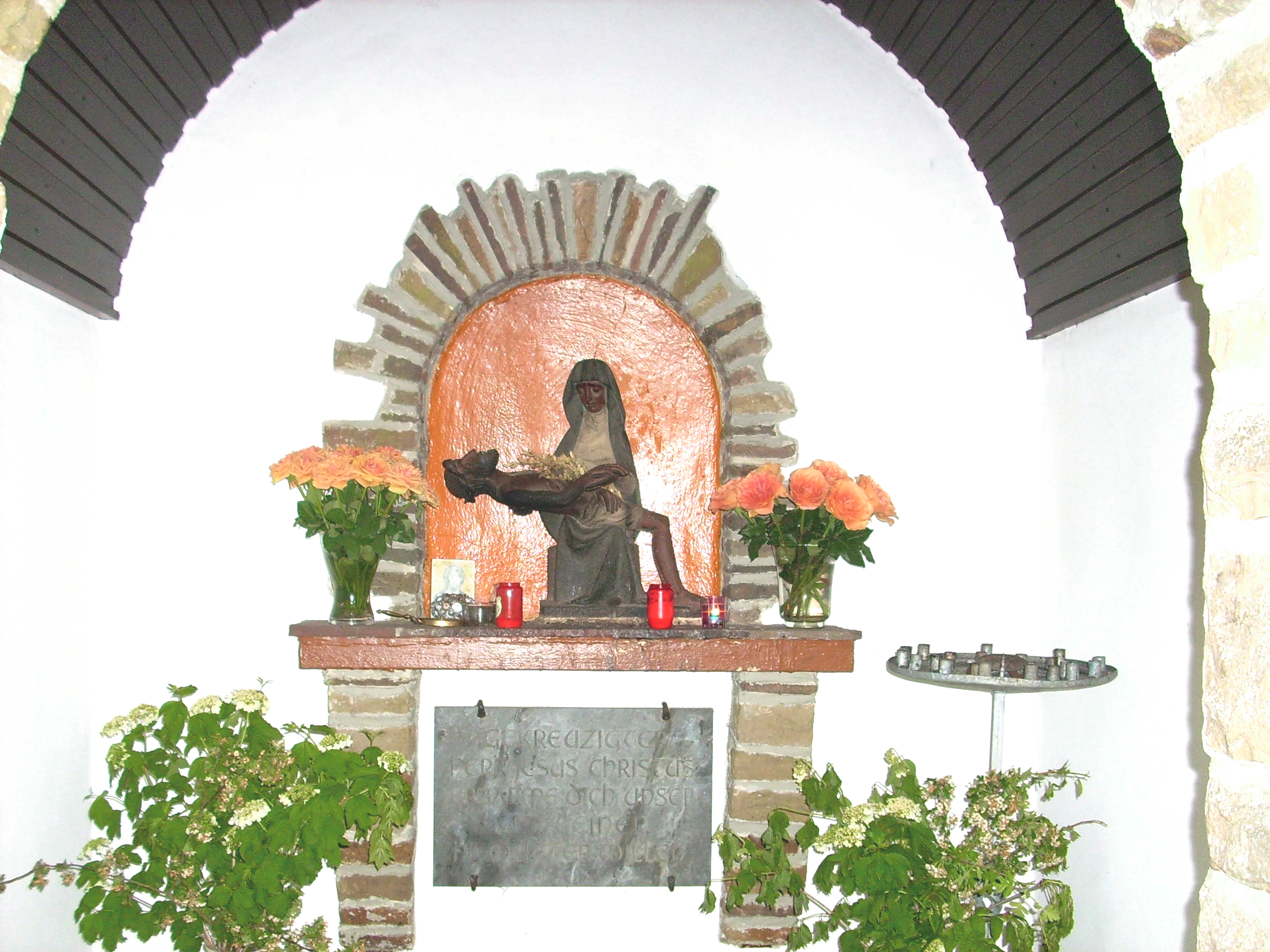
Pietà in the Heiligenhäuschen

Besides a chapel consecrated to Saint Brigid of Kildare that was newly built in 1850 with a Baroque altar from 1738, there is also within municipal limits a picturesque Heiligenhäuschen (a small, shrinelike structure consecrated to a saint or saints) that was built in the 1960s with a Pietà made of reddish basalt. Centrally located are, besides the chapel, the fountain square built in 1980, a playground renovated in 2006 with citizens’ personal contributions and a community centre with a fire station.

=== Buildings ===
- Saint Brigid's Catholic Church (branch church; Filialkirche St. Brigida), Hauptstraße, biaxial aisleless church, 18th/19th century (?).

== Economy and infrastructure ==
The small village is home to three major agricultural businesses of which two are outlying farms, and business selling tiles.
