= Alf (river) =

River in Germany

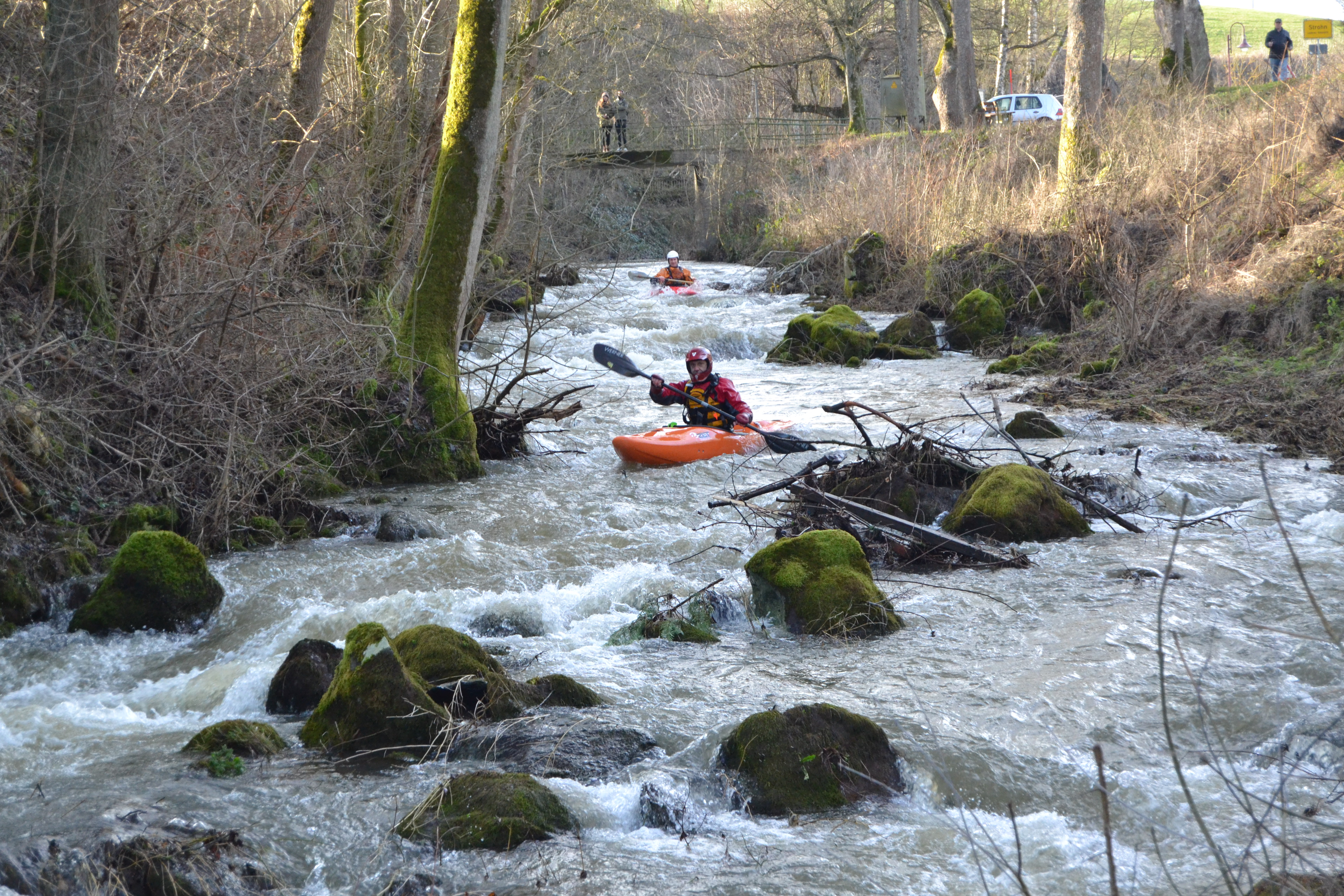
- Rapids in the Strohn Gorge near Strohn

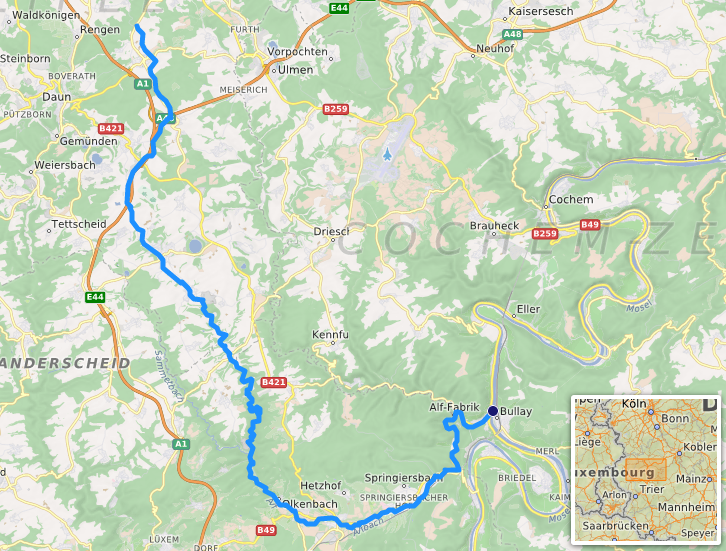
- Alf location

Location
- Country: Germany
- State: Rhineland-Palatinate
- Reference no.: DE: 268

Physical characteristics
- Source
  - location: North of Darscheid
  - coordinates: 50°13′41″N 6°53′08″E
  - elevation: 549 m above sea level (NHN)
- Mouth
  - location: Near Alf into the Moselle
  - coordinates: 50°03′26″N 7°07′43″E
  - elevation: 95 m above sea level (NHN)
- Length: 51.879 km
- Basin size: 358.146 km^{2}

Basin features
- Progression: Moselle→ Rhine→ North Sea
- Landmarks: Villages: Darscheid, Gillenfeld, Strohn, Bausendorf, Kinderbeuern, Bengel, Alf
- Tributaries
  - left: Laubach, Diefenbach, Holzbach, Salzbach, Olkenbach, Ewesbach, Kammerbach, Udelsbach, Saalsbach, Üßbach
  - right: Irlenbach, Sammetbach, Demichbach, Elterbach, Hoegbach, Ilbach, Erbach, Scherbach,

The Alf is a small river in Rhineland-Palatinate, Germany, a left tributary of the Moselle. It rises in the Eifel, near Darscheid, east of Daun. The Alf flows south through Mehren, Gillenfeld and Bausendorf, where it turns east to flow into the Moselle at the village of Alf.

== Geography ==
=== Course ===
The Alf rises about 1 kilometre (0.62 mi) northeast of Hörscheid in the Volcanic Eifel. From its source at a height of 549 metres (1,801 ft), the Alf initially flows in a southerly direction to the village of Darscheid, from which it flows to the east through the villages of Gillenfeld and Strohn. The next section of the Alf, to Bausendorf, is very winding; it then turns towards the east and cuts through the south of the forest of Kondelwald, passing the villages of Kinderbeuern and Bengel. Around 3.5 kilometres (2.2 mi) beyond Bengel it changes course abruptly and swings north. A ridge prevents it from flowing further east unto the Moselle, here just 500 metres (1,600 ft) away. After breaking through the Moselle Hills the Alf finally reaches the Moselle at Alf (Cochem-Zell) at a height of 95 metres (312 ft). Along its 53 kilometres (33 mi) course from source to mouth, the Alf descends through 454 metres (1,490 ft), giving it an average river bed gradient of 8.6‰.

=== Tributaries ===
Left tributaries
- Laubach near Gillenfeld at 393 m above NHN
- Diefenbach near Sprinker Mill at 328 m above NHN
- Holzbach behind the Oberscheidweiler Mill at 306 m above NHN
- Salzbach at 223 m above NHN
- Olkenbach near Olkenbach at 188 m above NHN
- Ewesbach near Kinderbeuern at 167 m above NHN
- Kammerbach between Kinderbeuern and Bengel at 149 m above NHN
- Füllersbach near Bengel at 141 m above NHN
- Udelsbach near Hammermühle at 130 m above NHN
- Saalsbach at 121 m above NHN
- Üßbach near Alf-Fabrik at 107 m above NHN
Right tributaries
- Irlenbach behind Darscheid at 458 m above NHN
- Sammetbach behind Niederscheidweiler 222 m above NHN
- Demichbach at 211 m above NHN
- Elterbach vor Kraulsmühle at 198 m above NHN
- Hoegbach near Heinzerather Mühle at 193 m above NHN
- Ilbach near Bengel at 142 m above NHN
- Erbach near Bengel at 142 m above NHN
- Scherbach near Bengel at 135 m above NHN
