= Bruno (archbishop of Trier) =

Archbishop of Trier

- Archbishop of Trier
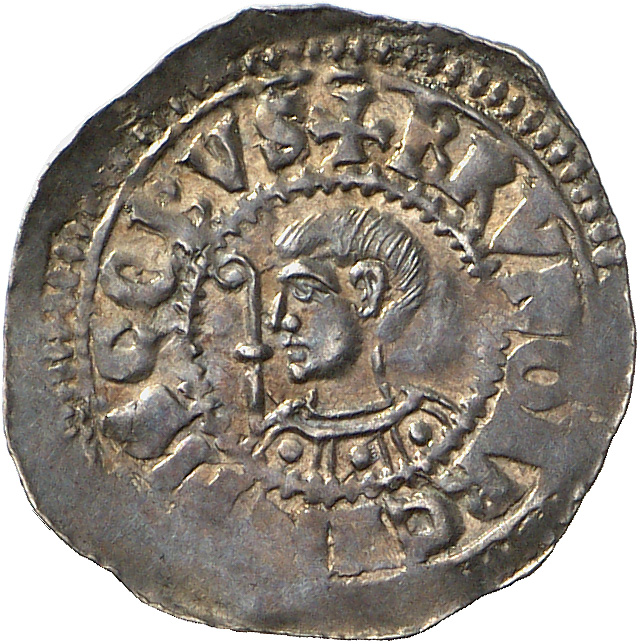
- Bruno's effigy on a silver denarius
- Church: Catholic Church
- Diocese: Electorate of Trier
- In office: 1101–1124

Personal details
- Born: c. 1045
- Died: 25 April 1124

Bruno (died 1124) was the archbishop of Trier from 1101 until his death. He was a relative of the Emperor Henry IV and a priest of Trier Cathedral prior to his election. He was invested with his office by the emperor amidst controversy.

With Duke Frederick I of Swabia and Archbishop Frederick I of Cologne, Bruno was part of a delegation sent by Henry IV to his rebellious son Henry V in early 1105. The job of the delegates was "somehow to reconcile" father and son, but they failed since the younger Henry refused to have anything to do with his excommunicated father.

In 1107 Bruno founded Springiersbach Abbey out of a bequest left to the church by a ministerialis named Benigna, who had belonged to the Count Palatine Siegfried of Orlamünde.

== Sources ==
- Arnold, Benjamin (1985). German Knighthood, 1050–1300. Oxford: Clarendon Press.
- Robinson, Ian S. (2000). Henry IV of Germany. New York: Cambridge University Press.
