= Mehren, Vulkaneifel =

Mehren
- Municipality
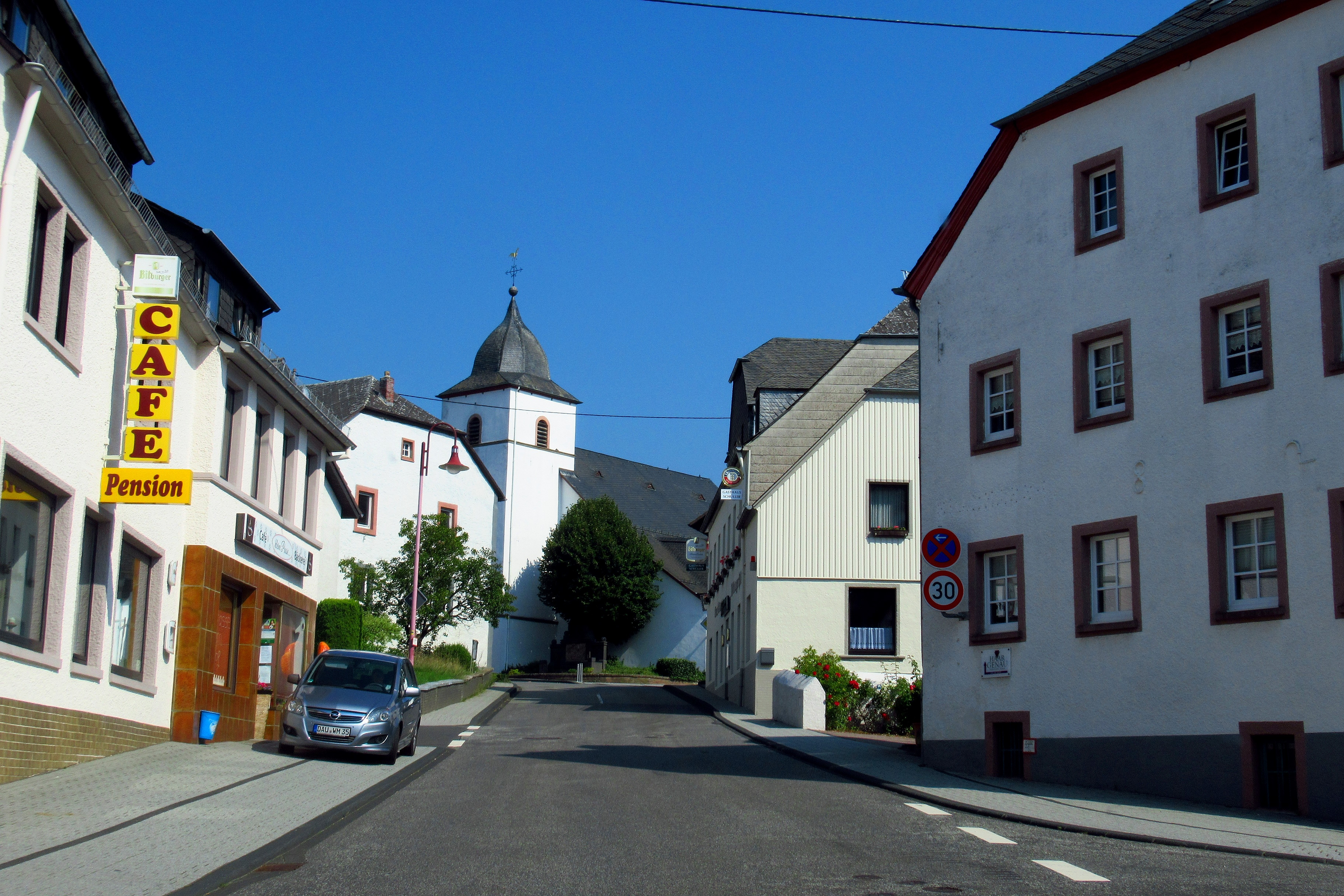

- Coat of arms

- Location of Mehren within Vulkaneifel district
- Interactive map of Mehren
- Location within Germany Location within Rhineland-Palatinate
- Coordinates: 50°10′38″N 6°52′40″E
- Country: Germany
- State: Rhineland-Palatinate
- District: Vulkaneifel
- Municipal assoc.: Daun

Government
  - Mayor (2019–24): Erwin Umbach

Area
  - Total: 12.96 km^{2} (5.00 sq mi)
- Elevation: 450 m (1,480 ft)

Population (2025-12-31)
  - Total: 1,292
  - Density: 99.69/km^{2} (258.2/sq mi)
- Time zone: UTC+01:00 (CET)
  - Summer (DST): UTC+02:00 (CEST)
- Postal codes: 54552
- Dialling codes: 06592
- Vehicle registration: DAU
- Website: www.mehren.de

Mehren (German pronunciation: [ˈmeːʁən]) is an Ortsgemeinde – a municipality belonging to a Verbandsgemeinde, a kind of collective municipality – in the Vulkaneifel district in Rhineland-Palatinate, Germany. It belongs to the Verbandsgemeinde of Daun, whose seat is in the like-named town.

== Geography ==
=== Location ===
The municipality lies in the Vulkaneifel, a part of the Eifel known for its volcanic history, geographical and geological features, and even ongoing activity today, including gases that sometimes well up from the earth. Mehren also lies on the Autobahn A 1.

=== Climate ===
Yearly precipitation in Mehren amounts to 832 mm, which is high, falling into the highest third of the precipitation chart for all Germany. At 69% of the German Weather Service's weather stations, higher figures are recorded. The driest month is April. The most rainfall comes in December. In that month, precipitation is 1.5 times what it is in April. Precipitation varies hardly at all and is distributed evenly throughout the year. Only at 0% of the weather stations are lower seasonal swings recorded.

== History ==
The Mehren area is known to have been settled as early as late Hallstatt times, about 700 BCE. Archaeologists have named the finds from ancient settlements, because they show such a uniformity among themselves, after the biggest centre in the area, calling the artifacts part of the "Mehren culture".

The remains of a Roman settlement were believed to have been found on the Mürmes (a moorland), and others have been confirmed near Schalkenmehren railway station and in Weinfeld. The Frankish settlement that followed the Roman period shows up mainly in grave finds and even in the traditional structures still seen today in the old village layout.

In 1282 and 1284, Mehren had its first documentary mentions in connection with donations to Prüm Abbey. According to a legend, the village of Mehren arose "out of several estates", or in German, aus mehreren Höfen, the dative form of mehrere ("several") in that phrase supposedly being where the village's name came from.

While it is true that such noble estates existed, the name's origins are not quite as the legend says. Clearly, the name developed from the prehistoric term mer, for "marshy water", through the Old High German derivative therefrom, meri, followed by Meren (14th century), Muren (1654) and Mem (1683) to today's form, Mehren (compare the English word "mere"). The most important lordly estates were the Zolverhof, the one believed to have been near the Mürmes, and the one that formerly stood on the Hostert, the Demeklischer Hof, which until 1482 belonged to the Count of Manderscheid.

In a church register from Archbishop Heinrich von Virneburg from 1316, the parish of Meren is already listed, whereafter it was to grow until 1803 into one of the biggest and most sprawling parochial regions in the so-called Eifel Deaconry. Belonging to this body, besides the parochial seat of Mehren, were the villages of Trittscheid, Tettscheid, Ellscheid, Steineberg, Steiningen, Allscheid, Darscheid and parts of Schönbach.

The oldest part of Saint Matthias’s Parish Church – the quire – was built in 1534 under Archbishop of Trier Josef von Metzhausen. The churchtower with the curved cupola comes from 1825, but only in the early 20th century was it given the former Himmerod Abbey church's portal. Together with the rectory, built in 1730, and the school, today a community centre, built in 1838 and 1875, the parish church forms the dominant feature of the village's appearance.

The village of Mehren has grown over the centuries to a considerable size in comparison with neighbouring places.

While life under the Electoral overlords brought little else but a scant livelihood in farming for the overwhelming majority of the people in Mehren, in the 19th century, there was an economic upswing during which Mehren grew into a prosperous market centre with a brewery, a tannery, many inns, craft businesses and shops. For broad sectors of the population, though, the new wealth brought no relief from the great need for a livelihood, and thus, between the years 1842 and 1890, no fewer than 364 people from Mehren emigrated to the United States.

== Politics ==
=== Municipal council ===
The council is made up of 16 council members, who were elected at the municipal election held on 7 June 2009, and the honorary mayor as chairman.

=== Mayor ===
Mehren's mayor is Erwin Umbach.

=== Coat of arms ===
The German blazon reads: Schild von Silber und Grün gespalten. Vorne ein rotes Balkenkreuz, hinten eine silberne, nach links gewendete Axt.

The municipality's arms might in English heraldic language be described thus: Per pale argent a cross gules and vert an axe palewise sinister of the first.

The cross is Electoral Trier's old armorial bearing, while the other charge, the axe, is Saint Matthias’s attribute, thus representing the municipality’s and the church’s patron saint. The field tincture on the sinister (armsbearer’s left, viewer’s right) side, vert (green), stands for the rustic charm of the local countryside and woods.

== Images ==
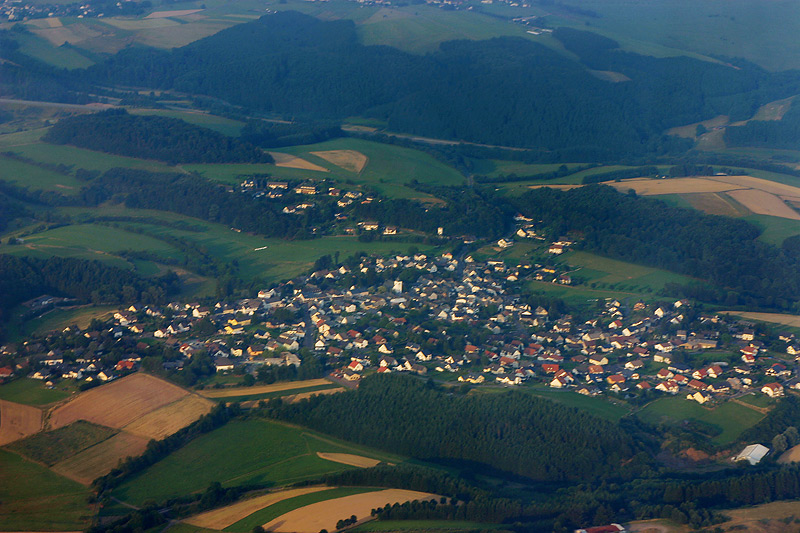
Mehren

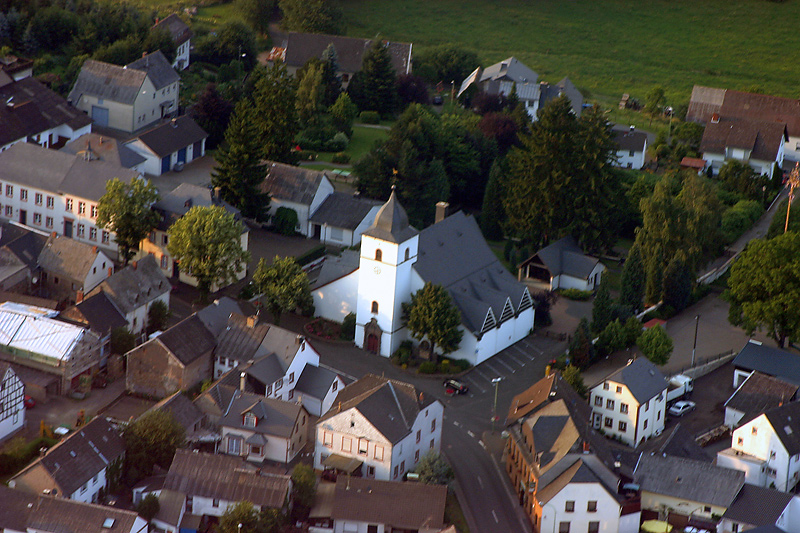
Mehren’s church

== Culture and sightseeing ==
=== Sport ===
SV (Sportverein – sport club) Mehren plays in a playing community along with SV Darscheid, in both the youth and senior sections.

TC (tennis club) Blau-Weiß Mehren has a good 100 members and puts forth 5 teams that take part in competitions (2 youth teams, 2 men’s teams and 1 men’s young seniors team).

=== Buildings ===
- Saint Matthias’s Parish Church, Hauptstraße, west tower 1825, former quire from 1534 incorporated into nave from 1965-1966, portal about 1700, warriors’ memorial 1914-1918, sandstone churchyard cross from 1542.
- Am Beckersberg 2 – house, latter half of 19th century.
- Hauptstraße 12 – Quereinhaus (a combination residential and commercial house divided for these two purposes down the middle, perpendicularly to the street) from 1847.
- Hauptstraße 14 – timber-frame house, partly solid.
- Hauptstraße 16 – five-axis building with mansard roof, possibly 18th century, entrance from mid 19th century.
- Poststraße 11 – corner estate, Classicist plastered building, about 1880, stable-barn, bakehouse or servants quarters.
- Poststraße 17 – Classicist plastered building from 1847.
- Steininger Straße 30 – quarrystone house, partly fitted with timber framing, 1608.
- Heiligenhäuschen (a small, shrinelike structure consecrated to a saint or saints), south of the village on the road to Schalkenmehren, enclosed wall block, 19th century?
- Heiligenhäuschen, west of and above the village northeast of the Weinfelder Maar, wall block from 1770

== Economy and infrastructure ==
=== Education ===
- Kindergarten
- Primary school
- Music school
