= Schönbach, Rhineland-Palatinate =

Schönbach
- Municipality
- Coat of arms

- Location of Schönbach within Vulkaneifel district
- Interactive map of Schönbach
- Location within Germany Location within Rhineland-Palatinate
- Coordinates: 50°12′53.92″N 6°56′47.56″E
- Country: Germany
- State: Rhineland-Palatinate
- District: Vulkaneifel
- Municipal assoc.: Daun

Government
  - Mayor (2019–24): Martin Knüvener

Area
  - Total: 4.67 km^{2} (1.80 sq mi)
- Elevation: 395 m (1,296 ft)

Population (2025-12-31)
  - Total: 244
  - Density: 52.2/km^{2} (135/sq mi)
- Time zone: UTC+01:00 (CET)
  - Summer (DST): UTC+02:00 (CEST)
- Postal codes: 54552
- Dialling codes: 02676
- Vehicle registration: DAU

Schönbach (Eifel dialect: Schimich) is an Ortsgemeinde – a municipality belonging to a Verbandsgemeinde, a kind of collective municipality – in the Vulkaneifel district in Rhineland-Palatinate, Germany. It belongs to the Verbandsgemeinde of Daun, whose seat is in the like-named town.

== Geography ==
=== Location ===
The municipality lies in the Vulkaneifel, a part of the Eifel known for its volcanic history, geographical and geological features, and even ongoing activity today, including gases that sometimes well up from the earth.

Near Schönbach runs the Autobahn A 1.

=== Geology ===
The bedrock under Schönbach is made up of greywacke, a mineral of the Rheinisches Schiefergebirge (Rhenish Slate Mountains), which formed 360,000,000 years ago out of the ooze on the floor of the Devonian Sea. Often found in this stone are fossils of long extinct marine animals. Volcanic activity began aeons later, after an uplift had already laid the former seabed bare. The most recent volcanoes, the maar volcanoes, are only about 9000 years old.

== History ==
Traces of early human habitation have been found locally, including stone tools, sometimes ground, dating from the New Stone Age, which began about 4000 BC. They passed through the dale as hunter-gatherers and later settled, as witnessed by the ringwalls on the Hommerich and the Steineberger Ley, local peaks. There are barrows in Schönbach dating from this time, as well. Finds made there, such as “fat-bellied” urns, small bowls, bronze rings, neck rings and iron lance heads, date the barrows to the 7th century BC. Research has yielded information that these people were Celts, more specifically the Treveri, a people of mixed Celtic and Germanic stock, from whom the Latin name for the city of Trier, Augusta Treverorum, is also derived.

In Roman times, which began in 51 BC when Julius Caesar subdued the Celts, Roman roads sprang up in the Eifel, and many buildings appeared, one of which was at the foot of the Kreuzberg in Schönbach. A springwater parlour has also been brought to light. According to the State Museum in Trier, it is Roman. A Roman grave was also unearthed during Flurbereinigung. It yielded two well preserved urns, now in the State Museum.

Next came the Franks, who ended Roman hegemony in the Eifel in the 5th century AD. Placenames ending in —heim and —hof were given places that arose as a single household, whereas groups of houses – villages – were given names ending in —dorf, —hausen, —bach, —feld, —born, —roth, —rat, —scheid, —berg or —bruch.

Christianity first arrived in the region even in Roman times, although the Franks were not Christian when they first settled. It is known that Frankish King Clovis I converted to Christianity after his victory at the Battle of Tolbiac (Zülpich). Furthermore, the preamble to the Salic law, the Franks’ law written in the 5th or 6th century, reads: “Long live Christ, Who loves the Franks! May He keep their empire and fill its leaders with the light of His grace.” Clearly, the Franks had become a Christian power.

Later on in the Middle Ages, the village's namesake brook, the Schönbach, formed the border between the Electorates of Cologne and Trier, thus splitting the village between these two bodies.

In 1364, Schönbach had its first documentary mention on the Sunday after Saint Vitus’s Day (15 June). The document itself, thus dated, deals with Arnold von Daun’s yearly payment of 7 Gulden to Burkhard von Vinstigen, Lord of Schönecken, and his wife Blanchflor from his half of an estate at Schonnbach; he also enfeoffed Burkhard with this holding.

The Thirty Years' War spared no village in the Eifel. What was not felled by the sword was beaten by hunger and sickness – the Plague. In 1563, before the war, Schönbach had 17 houses. In 1654, after the war, only 5 hearths remained.

After the Thirty Years' War, Schönbach belonged to the Electoral-Trier Amt of Daun (actually beginning in 1357). The Electorate of Cologne, however, continued to hold the Amt ecclesiastically until 1801.

In 1716, a chapel was built in Schönbach. It stood until 1968.

In the wake of the French Revolution in 1789, German armies invaded France, but were not only repulsed, but also overwhelmed on their own soil. This put an end to the Electorate of Trier and indeed, all lands on the Rhine’s left bank then found themselves under French rule as a result of the 1797 Treaty of Campo Formio. Schönbach became part of the Mairie (“Mayoralty”) of Sarmersbach in the Canton of Daun, which in turn was part of the Arrondissement of Prüm in the Department of Sarre. Napoleonic administrative reform grouped Schönbach parochially with Utzerath, Allscheid and Hörscheid, thus ending the parochial division that had prevailed in Schönbach. French rule ended with the Congress of Vienna in 1814 and Waterloo the following year, which put a definitive end to Napoleonic times.

The late 18th and 19th centuries were lean years in the Eifel. Farmers owned little enough livestock without the sicknesses that struck both cattle and swine in these years, which not only decimated herds but also raised the price of meat. Furthermore, a column of 40,000 Russian troops who passed through the needy region in May 1814 on their way back home to Russia did not help matters. The Kingdom of Prussia acquired not only new territory under the terms of the Congress of Vienna, but also no dearth of new problems. Worst of all was the Year Without a Summer – 1816 – which almost drove the Eifel into famine.

Between 1870 and 1890, railways began to crisscross the Eifel, but none ever came to Schönbach. The nearest stations were in Utzerath and Ulmen.

In 1882, sixteen children in Schönbach – and many more in the district as a whole – died in an outbreak of scarlet fever, literally decimating the village, whose population had been 160.

The turn of the 20th century brought Schönbach some measure of relief from the usual neediness. This was a time that saw the rise of industry in the cities, and this replaced the customary emigration to places overseas with migration to industrial areas within Germany itself. Many from the region found work there and remitted their earnings to the still struggling Eifel.

The early 20th century brought the First and Second World Wars, each sweeping away an old order and replacing it with a new one. After the Second World War, 21 new houses were built in Schönbach and 13 other buildings were remodelled or expanded. Streets were paved and a new freezer building was built. A new chapel was built to replace the old one built in 1716. On 2 February 1959, work began on Flurbereinigung, the rearrangement of rural property boundaries, which over the centuries had become such a tangle that agriculture had become rather inefficient owing to the splintered bits of property that had arisen over time. Heading the board that oversaw this undertaking was Peter Hab and the treasurer was Rudi Röder, both from Schönbach. The work resulted not only in a redistribution of lands among the landowners, but also in woods and hedgerows being removed. New hedgerows were planted in some places as windbreaks, and as habitat for birds and hedgehogs. A new drainage system was also laid out.

== Politics ==
=== Municipal council ===
The council is made up of 6 council members, who were elected at the municipal election held on 7 June 2009, and the honorary mayor as chairman.

=== Mayor ===
Schönbach's mayor is Martin Knüvener.

=== Coat of arms ===
The German blazon reads: In Silber durch schräglinke, blaue Wellenleiste geteilt; oben ein rotes Balkenkreuz, unten ein roter Schild belegt mit 9 (3 : 3 : 3) goldenen Kugeln.

The municipality's arms might in English heraldic language be described thus: Argent a bend sinister wavy azure between a cross gules and an inescutcheon of the same charged with nine bezants, three, three and three.

The wavy bend sinister refers to the municipality's namesake brook, the Schönbach. The red cross refers to Schönbach's former allegiance to the Electorate of Trier as part of the Amt of Daun from 1357. The inescutcheon charged with nine bezants (golden disks, or in this case balls or orbs, as the German blazon has it) is Saint Quirinus's attribute, thus representing the municipality's patron saint.

== Culture and sightseeing ==
Buildings:

- Across the street from Borngasse 5 – timber-frame house, 17th/18th century.
- Schönbachermühle (mill), east of the village on the Ueßbach
