= Volcanic bomb =

Mass of molten rock ejected during an eruption

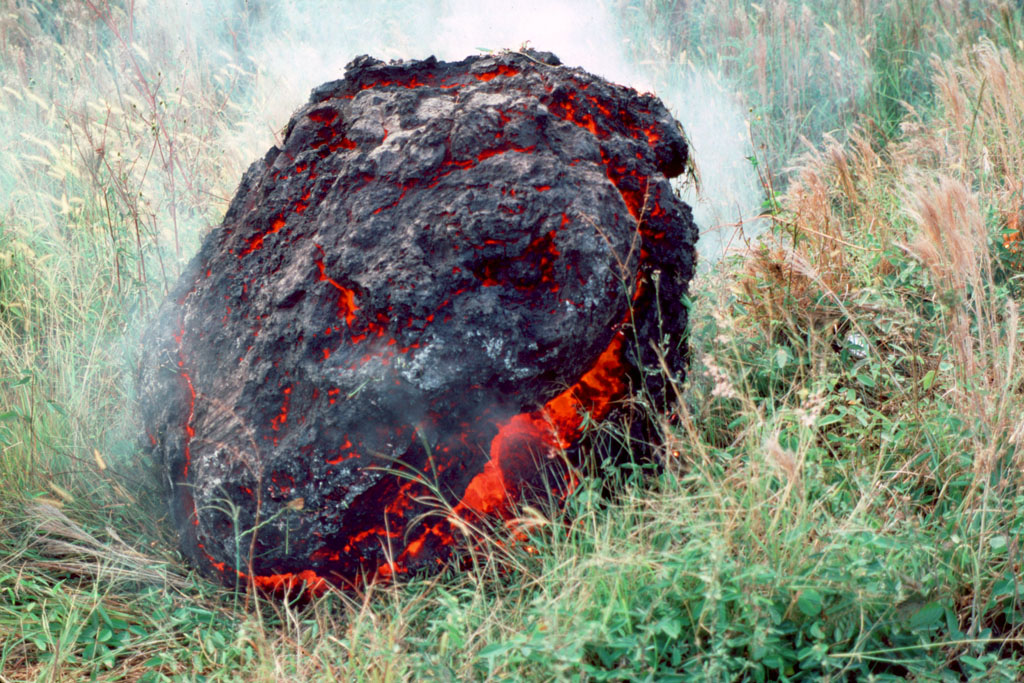
Lava bomb, ejected from the Kīlauea Volcano, Hawaii in 1983

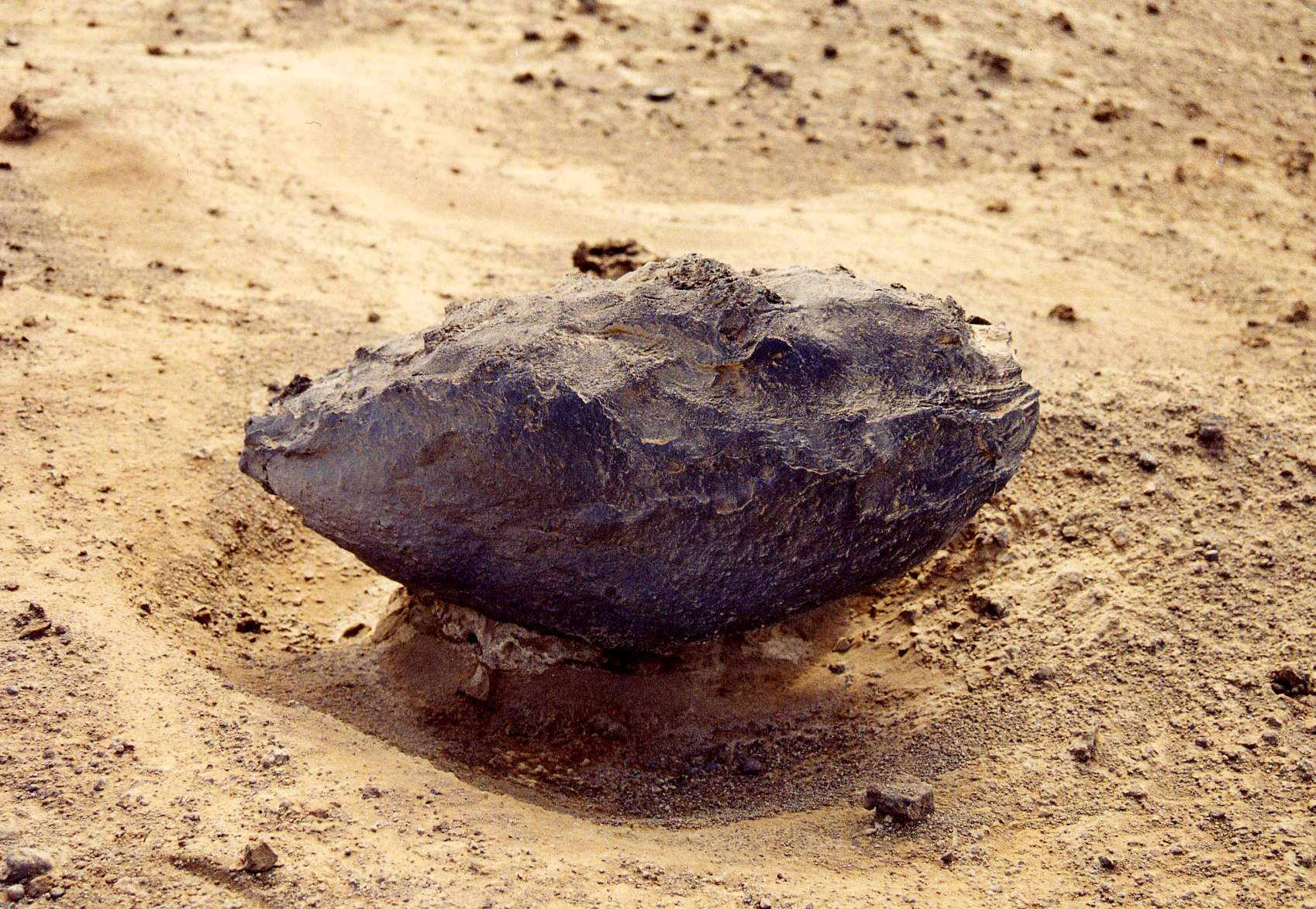
"Fusiform" type volcanic bomb. Capelinhos Volcano, Faial Island, Azores

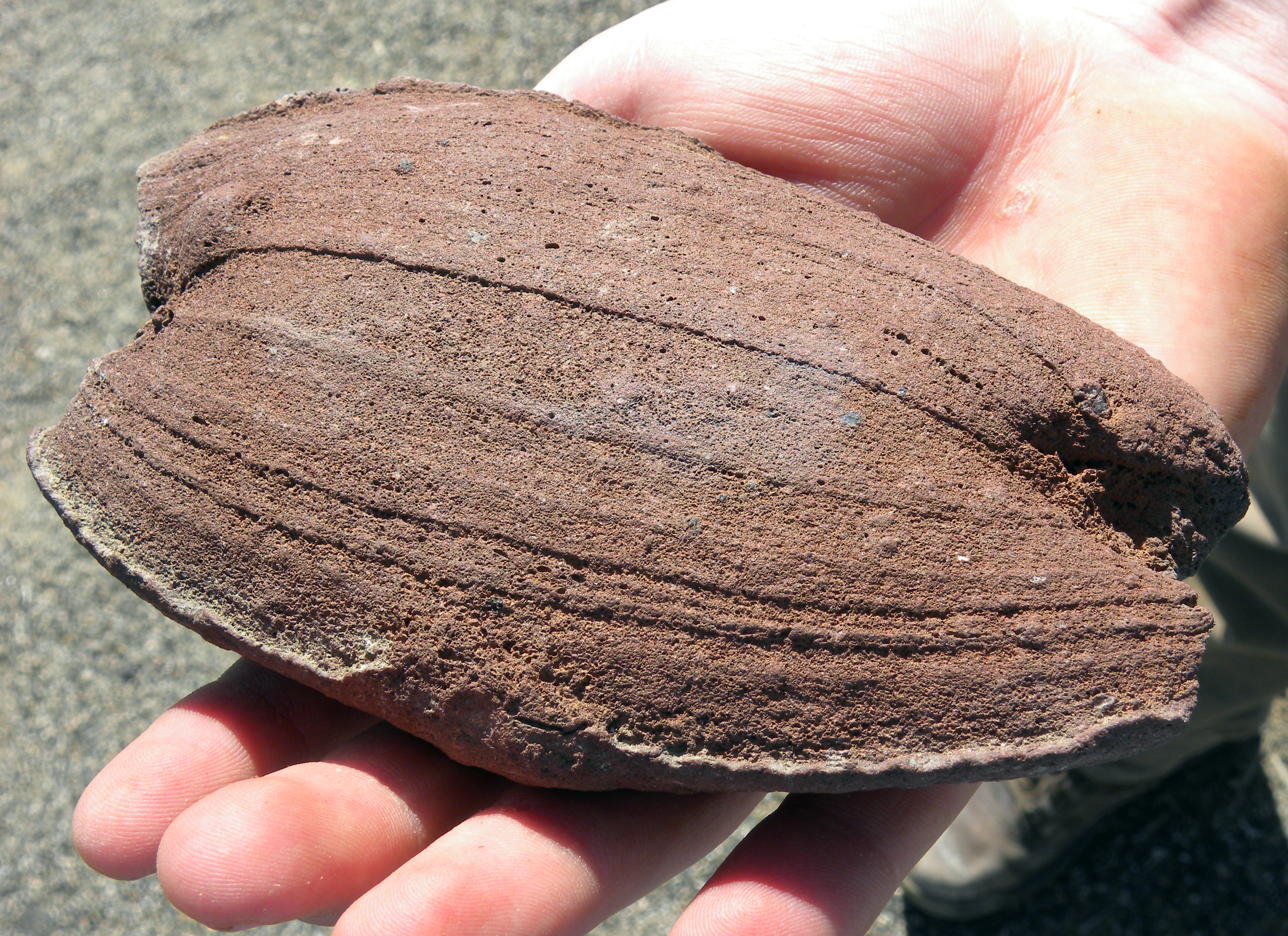
"Almond" type volcanic bomb found in the Cinder Cones region of the Mojave National Preserve

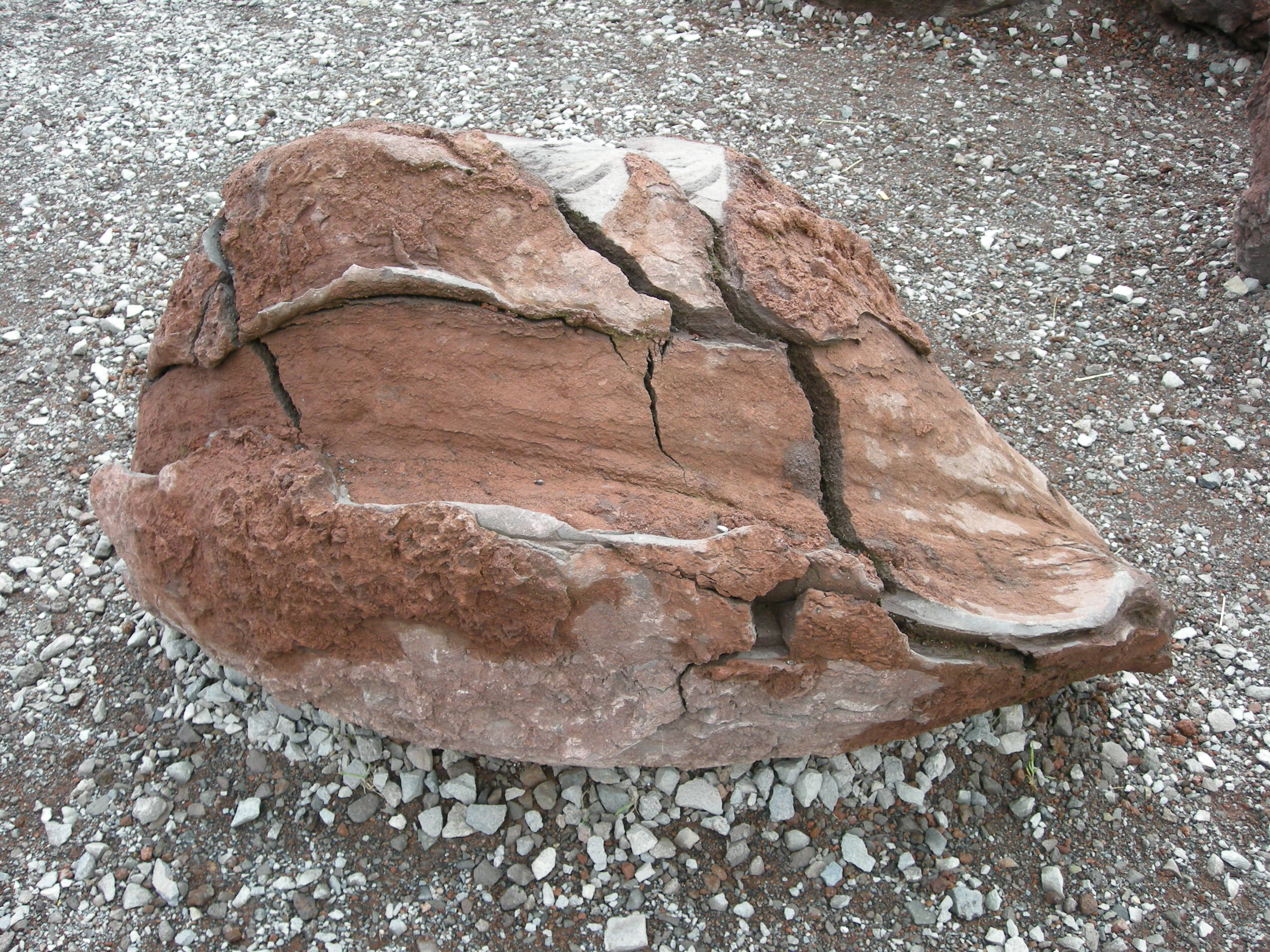
"Bread-crust" type volcanic bomb at Vulcania, Puy-de-Dôme, France

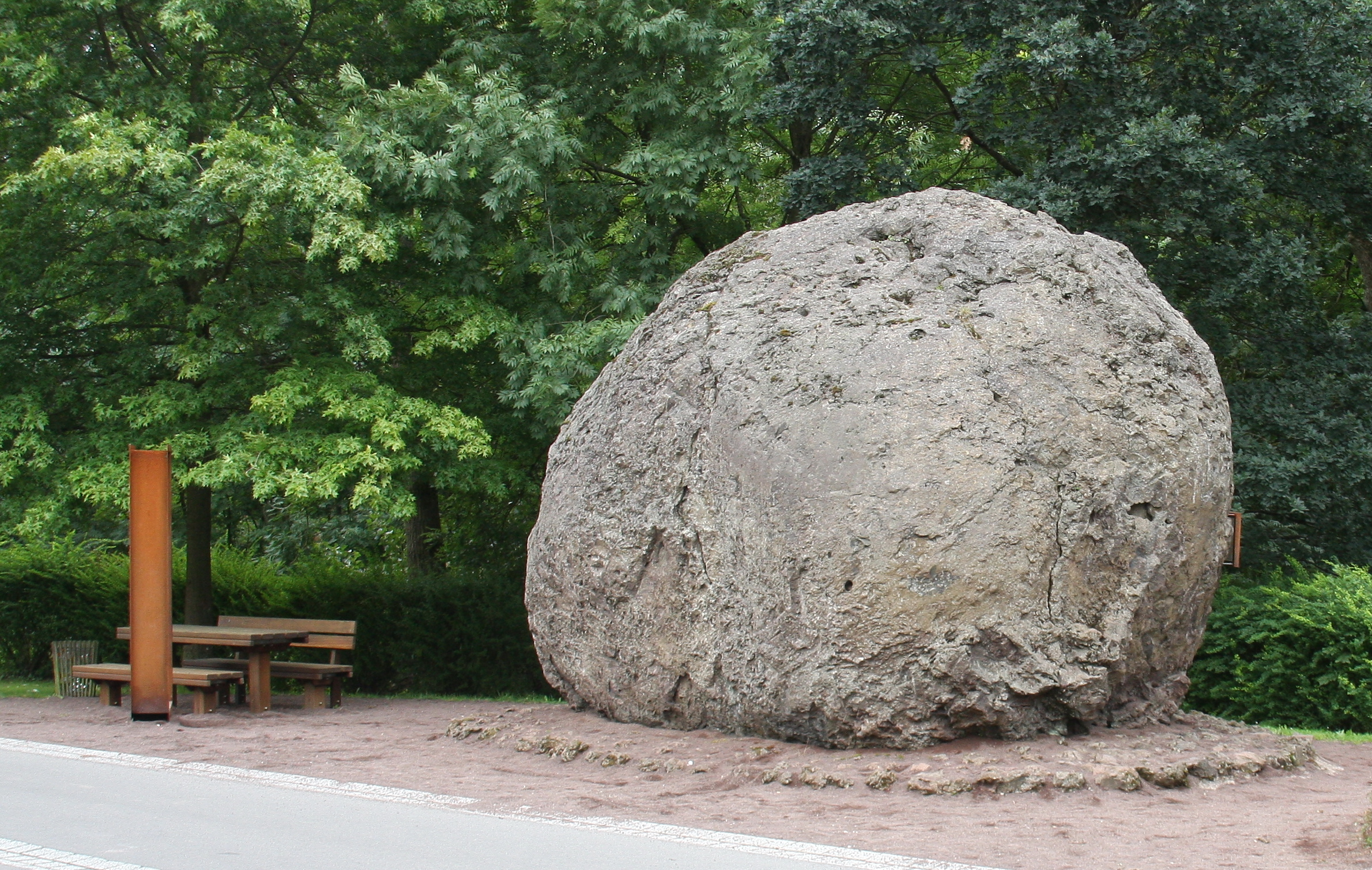
Lava bomb at Strohn, Rhineland-Palatinate, Germany, with a diameter of 5 metres and a mass of 120 tonnes. It was caused by a volcanic eruption in 8300 BC.

A volcanic bomb or lava bomb is a mass of partially molten rock (tephra) larger than 64 mm (2.5 inches) in diameter, formed when a volcano ejects viscous fragments of lava during an eruption. Because volcanic bombs cool after they leave the volcano, they are extrusive igneous rocks. Volcanic bombs can be thrown many kilometres from an erupting vent, and often acquire aerodynamic shapes during their flight. Volcanic bombs can be extremely large; the 1935 eruption of Mount Asama in Japan expelled bombs measuring 5–6 m (16-20 ft) in diameter to a distance up to 600 m (2,000 ft) from the vent. Volcanic bombs are a potentially deadly volcanic hazard in an eruption zone. In an incident at Galeras volcano in Colombia in 1993, six people near the summit were killed and several seriously injured by lava bombs when an eruption broke out unexpectedly. On July 16, 2018, 23 people were injured on a tour boat near the Kilauea volcano by a basketball-sized lava bomb from the Puna eruption.

Volcanic bombs occasionally explode from internal gas pressure as they cool, but in most cases, the damage is from impact or subsequent fire. Explosions are most often observed in "bread-crust" type bombs.

== Bomb types ==
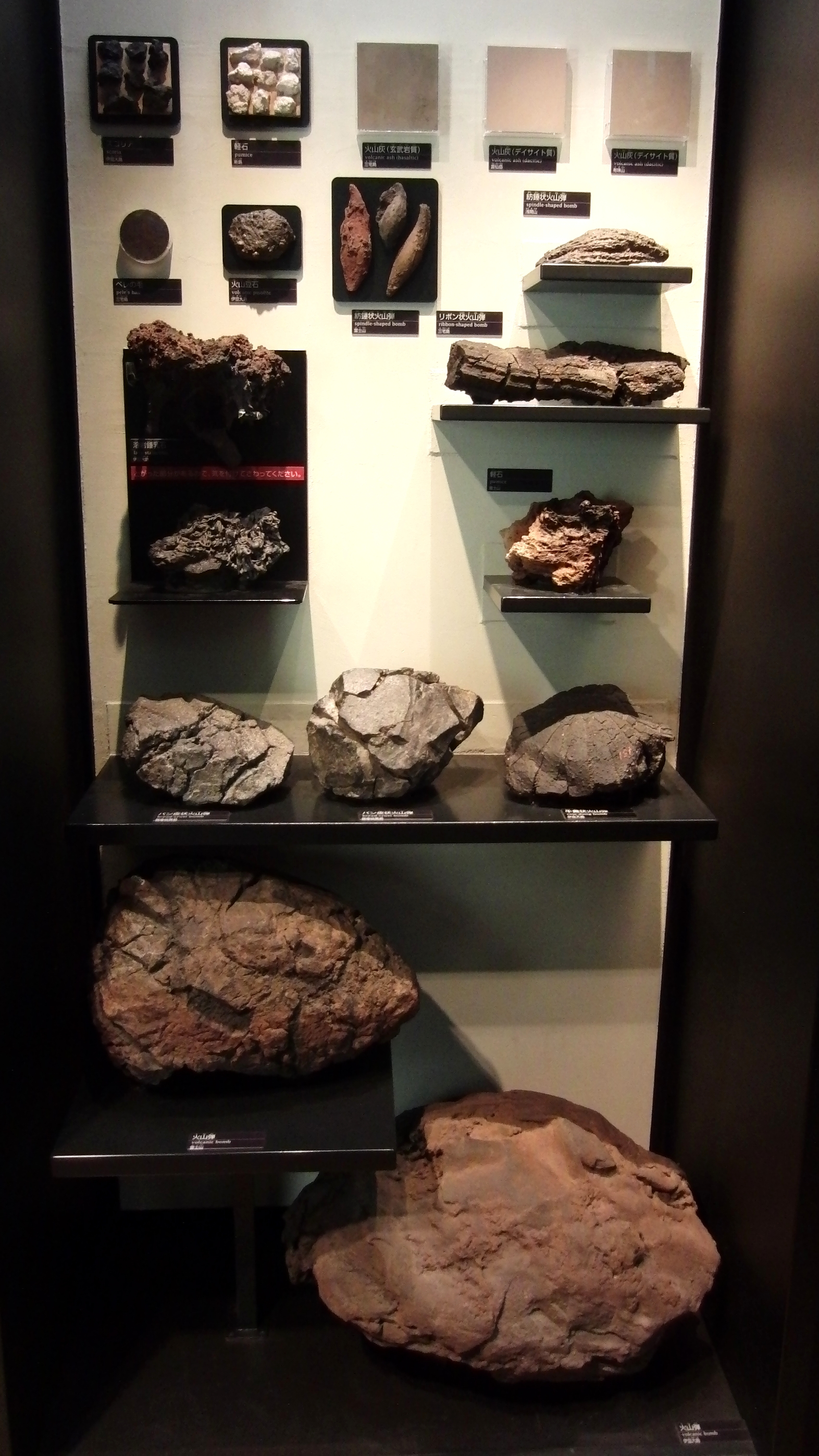
Various volcanic bombs in the National Museum of Nature and Science, Tokyo, Japan

Bombs are named according to their shape, which is determined by the fluidity of the magma from which they are formed.

- Ribbon or cylindrical bombs form from highly to moderately fluid magma, ejected as irregular strings and blobs. The strings break up into small segments which fall to the ground intact and look like ribbons. They are circular or flattened in cross section, are fluted along their length, and have tabular vesicles.
- Spherical bombs also form from high to moderately fluid magma, when surface tension pulls the ejecta into spheres.
- Spindle, fusiform, or almond/rotational bombs are formed by the same processes, but with only a partial spherical shape. Spinning during flight leaves these bombs looking elongated or almond shaped; this theory of their formation has also given them the name 'fusiform bombs'. They are characterised by longitudinal fluting, one side slightly smoother and broader than the other. The smooth side forms as the underside of the bomb during flight.
- Cow pie or cow dung bombs are formed when highly fluid magma falls from moderate height and is still liquid when it strikes the ground. They flatten or splash to form irregular discs resembling cow dung.
- Bread-crust bombs form when the outside of a lava bomb solidifies during flight. It may develop a cracked outer surface as the interior continues to expand.
- Cored bombs have rinds of lava enclosing a core of previously consolidated lava. The core consists of accessory fragments of an earlier eruption, accidental fragments of country rock (such as xenoliths) or occasionally bits of previous lava from the same eruption.
