= Bausendorf =

- Municipality
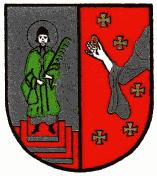
- Coat of arms

- Location of Bausendorf within Bernkastel-Wittlich district
- Interactive map of Bausendorf
- Location within Germany Location within Rhineland-Palatinate
- Coordinates: 50°00′56″N 06°59′52″E
- Country: Germany
- State: Rhineland-Palatinate
- District: Bernkastel-Wittlich
- Municipal assoc.: Traben-Trarbach
- Subdivisions: 2

Government
  - Mayor (2019–24): Hans-Peter Heck

Area
  - Total: 11.86 km^{2} (4.58 sq mi)
- Elevation: 177 m (581 ft)

Population (2025-12-31)
  - Total: 1,392
  - Density: 117.4/km^{2} (304.0/sq mi)
- Time zone: UTC+01:00 (CET)
  - Summer (DST): UTC+02:00 (CEST)
- Postal codes: 54538
- Dialling codes: 06532
- Vehicle registration: WIL
- Website: www.bausendorf.de

Bausendorf (German pronunciation: [ˈbaʊzn̩dɔʁf]; also known locally as Bausendorf-Olkenbach) is an Ortsgemeinde – a municipality belonging to a Verbandsgemeinde, a kind of collective municipality – in the Bernkastel-Wittlich district in Rhineland-Palatinate, Germany.

== Geography ==
The holiday resort of Bausendorf with its outlying centre of Olkenbach is found sheltered at the foot of the broad Kondelwald forest in the southern Eifel in the lower Alf valley. The municipal area is 54.5% wooded. It belongs to the Verbandsgemeinde of Traben-Trarbach.

== History ==
Beginning in 1794, Bausendorf was under French rule, and then in 1814 the village was assigned to the Kingdom of Prussia at the Congress of Vienna. Since 1947, it has been part of the then newly founded state of Rhineland-Palatinate. Today's Ortsgemeinde came into being within the framework of administrative reform through the merger of the formerly separate municipalities of Bausendorf and Olkenbach on 7 June 1969.

== Politics ==
The municipal council is made up of 16 council members, who were elected by proportional representation at the municipal election held on 7 June 2009, and the honorary mayor as chairman.

The municipal election held on 7 June 2009 yielded the following results:

Year	SPD	Steinmetz	Zukunft	Total
2009	3	7	6	16 seats

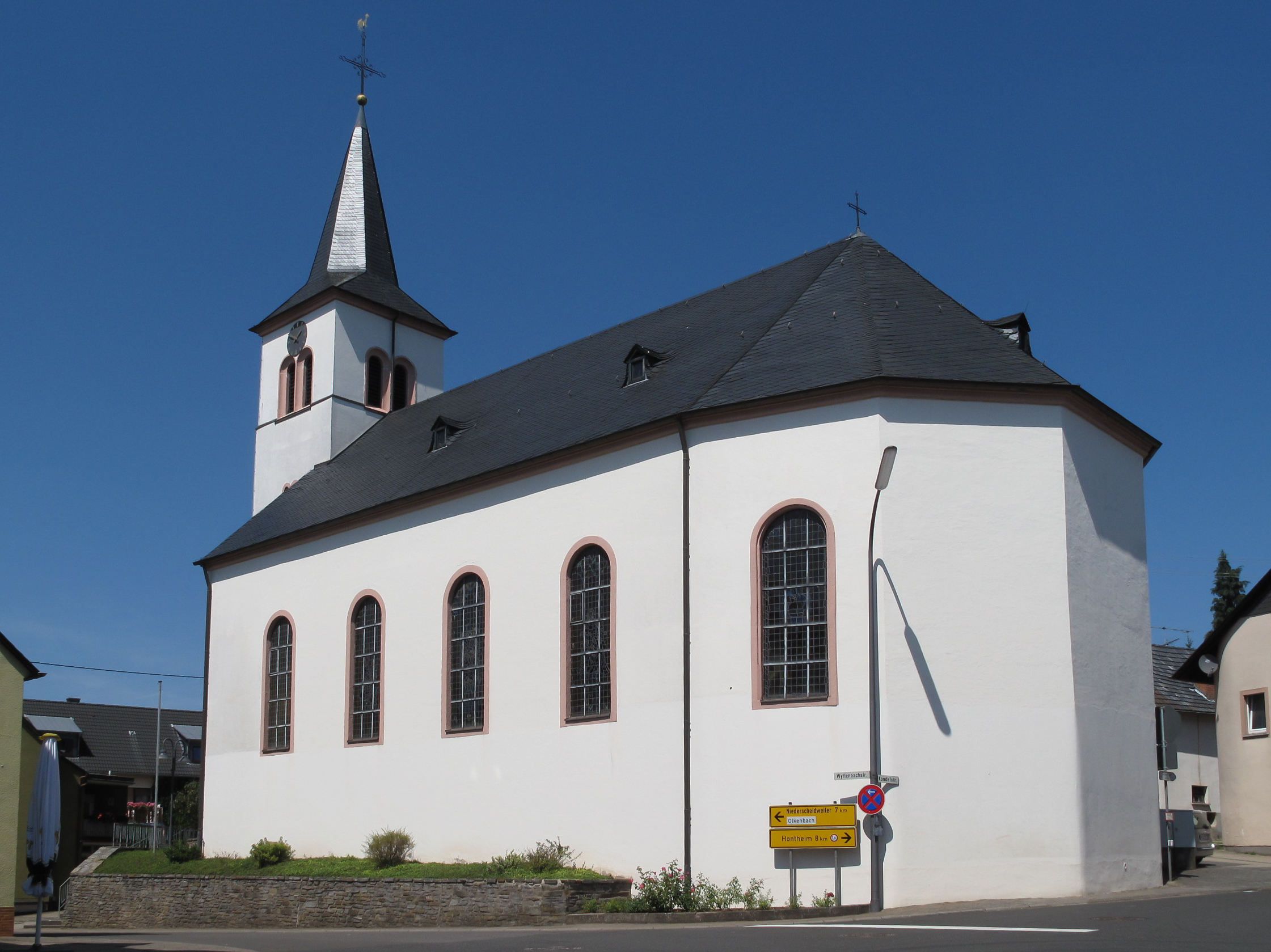
Bausendorf, church

== Culture and sightseeing ==
The St. Bartholomäus Wallfahrtskirche Heinzerath (“Saint Bartholomew’s Heinzerath Pilgrimage Church”) in the outlying centre of Olkenbach stands on the bank of the Alf. The inhabitants of the nearby Eifel, the middle Moselle and the “Wittlich Valley” (Wittlicher Tal) make a pilgrimage each year to this church at harvest time.

== Economy and infrastructure ==
Bausendorf has a daycare centre and a primary school. It also has a bakery, a postal agency, two electrical specialists’ shops, a butcher shop and three car dealerships.

Through the municipality runs Bundesstraße 49. To the west runs the Autobahn A 1. In Ürzig is a railway station on the Moselstrecke (Moselle Line).
