= Strohn =

- Municipality
- Coat of arms

- Location of Strohn within Vulkaneifel district
- Interactive map of Strohn
- Location within Germany Location within Rhineland-Palatinate
- Coordinates: 50°6′37.34″N 6°55′20.98″E
- Country: Germany
- State: Rhineland-Palatinate
- District: Vulkaneifel
- Municipal assoc.: Daun

Government
  - Mayor (2019–24): Heinz Martin

Area
  - Total: 8.60 km^{2} (3.32 sq mi)
- Elevation: 390 m (1,280 ft)

Population (2025-12-31)
  - Total: 504
  - Density: 58.6/km^{2} (152/sq mi)
- Time zone: UTC+01:00 (CET)
  - Summer (DST): UTC+02:00 (CEST)
- Postal codes: 54558
- Dialling codes: 06573
- Vehicle registration: DAU
- Website: www.strohn.de

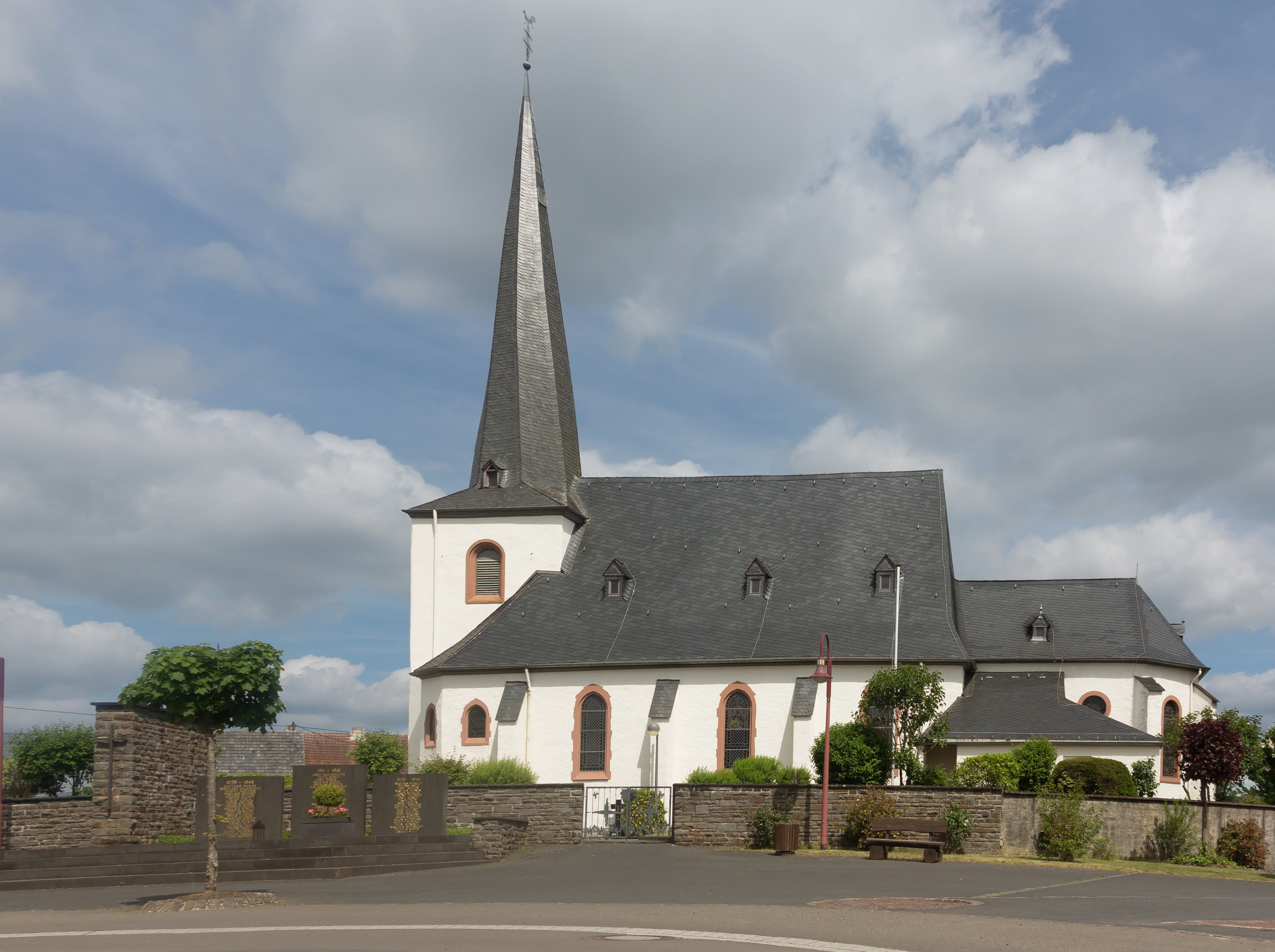
Strohn, catholic church: die Pfarrkirche Sankt Johannes der Täufer

Strohn is an Ortsgemeinde – a municipality belonging to a Verbandsgemeinde, a kind of collective municipality – in the Vulkaneifel district in Rhineland-Palatinate, Germany. It belongs to the Verbandsgemeinde of Daun, whose seat is in the like-named town.

== Geography ==
=== Location ===
The municipality lies in the Vulkaneifel, a part of the Eifel known for its volcanic history, geographical and geological features, and even ongoing activity today, including gases that sometimes well up from the earth.

Strohn lies south of Gillenfeld and the Pulvermaar, a local volcanic crater lake, on the river Alf’s left bank.

=== Constituent communities ===
The following hamlets and homesteads belong to Strohn: Altheck, Buchholz, Dornheck, Herrenbüsch, Sprink, Tannenhof and Trautzberg.

=== Vulcanism ===
The surrounding area is characterized by the Eifel’s vulcanism. Particularly worthy of mention is the Strohner Märchen, a small maar that has almost dried up (Märchen here is a diminutive of Maar, not the German word for "fairy tale"). It came into being about 8,100 years ago through a side eruption of the Römerberg, a local cinder cone. Together with the Pulvermaar and the Römerberg, it forms a nature conservation area, which became protected in 1984.

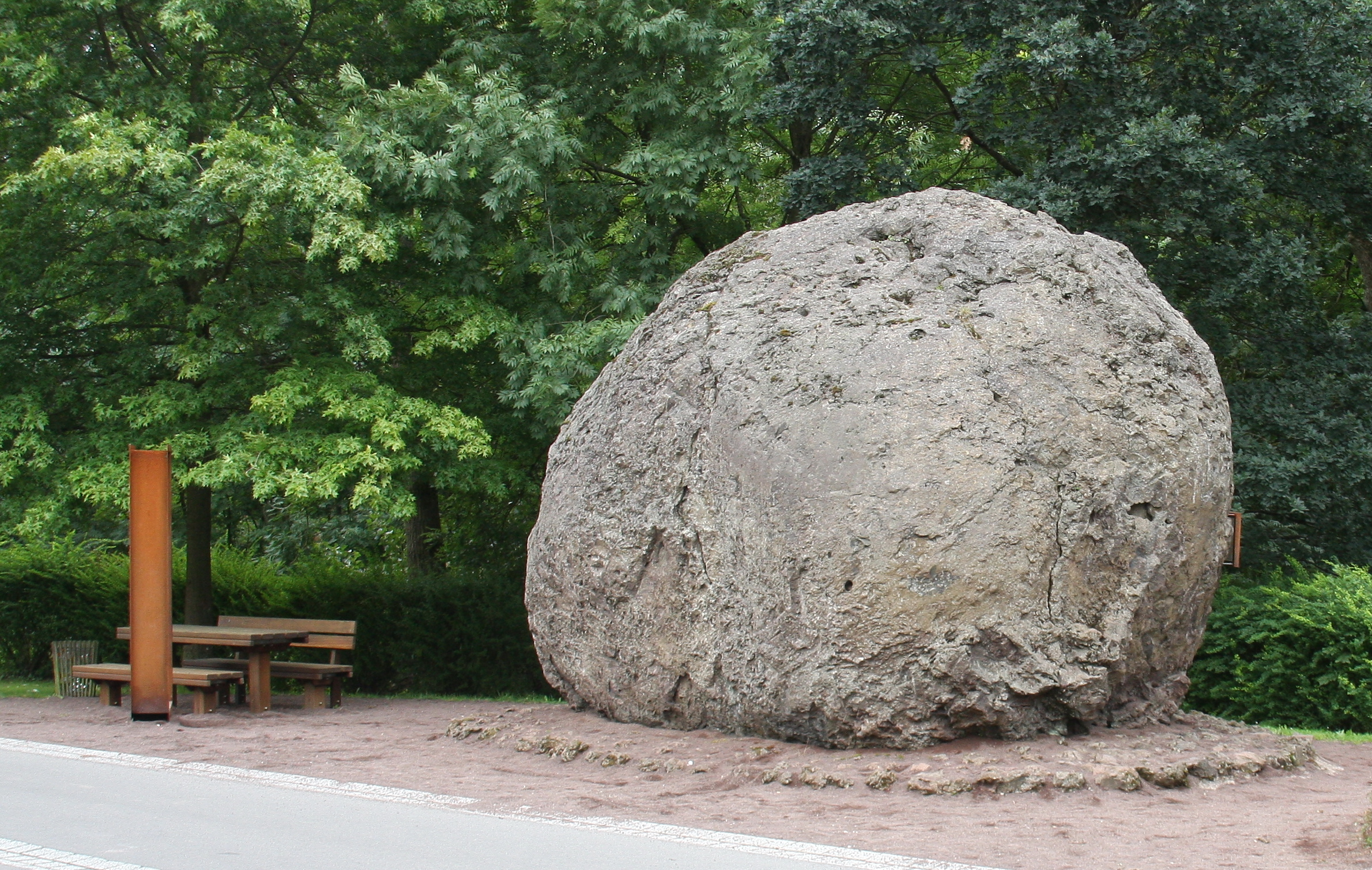
Lava bomb at Strohn, with a diameter of 5 metres and a mass of 120 tonnes. It was caused by a volcanic eruption in 8300 BC

In the village itself sits a lava bomb, a basalt globe formed by volcanic activity. It has a diameter of some five metres and a weight of more than 120 metric tons. It formed not through a single expulsion from the volcanic vent, but rather by being shot upwards several times and then sliding back down into the crater, getting a new coating of lava and cinder each time until it got stuck at the edge of the crater and cooled permanently. It came to light in 1969 during blasting at a quarry on the volcanic cone, and in the winter of 1980 and 1981 was towed on an iron plate over a compacted layer of snow with a bulldozer into the village centre.

== History ==
As early as Roman times, there was a settlement at what is now Strohn named Struhna. The view into the distance from the Wartgesberg (mountain) as far as the Altburg and the heights of the Hunsrück was used by the Romans, who built watchtowers on its heights.

Emperor Heinrich VI, who was the great Emperor Barbarossa's son, transferred lordship over Struhna and the estate of Drucksbersch (Trautzberg) to Springiersbach Abbey. This monastery maintained a monasterial estate here with huge forest and land areas. The estate buildings stood in what is today's outlying centre of Sprink. Even today, Springiersbach's coat of arms can be found preserved on a house in Sprink.

Among the places named in a confirmation document issued by Heinrich VI to Abbot Absalon von Springiersbach are cropfields and meadows at Struhna. In 1297, Count Heinrich of Luxembourg enfeoffed the knight Richard, Lord of Daun, with the tithes from Stroin. In 1299, the fief was expanded to include the whole village, which hitherto had only been an allodial holding.

A newly built house – a fortified one – was owned in 1336 by Aegidius, Lord of Daun, who, because of this house, had to assume obligations to the Archbishop. In later centuries, the monastery's estate was forsaken. The lands and woods were sold off, and bought up by the villagers. The estate buildings in Sprink were acquired by three families. Even today, there are agricultural businesses being run there.

In the Middle Ages, Strohn was also the site of a high court.

In the 19th century, Strohn found itself under the lordship of the Count of Daun and thereby belonged to the County of Daun. A great fire struck the village in 1760, and it burnt down utterly. Only one house was left, the Justenhaus owned by the family Schmitz. Even the church's nave burnt down; only the tower remained standing. From inside, the old Marien Glocke (bell) still sounds. It bears the year 1483 and this inscription, in archaic German: Maria heißen ich, alle Weder verdriffen ich Claus von Enen gos mich ("Maria is my name, all weather I drive away, Claus von Enen poured me").

During the time of French rule, Strohn was the seat of a mairie ("mayoralty") in the Canton of Manderscheid and the Arrondissement of Prüm, and even into Prussian times, this was still a Bürgermeisterei (also "mayoralty"). On 22 August 1841, with ministerial permission, the Bürgermeisterei of Strohn was amalgamated with that of Gillenfeld. The Bürgermeisterei of Strohn included until 1841 Brockscheid, Immerath, mit dem Heckenhofe, Mückeln mit Schutzalf, Niederwinkel, Oberwinkel, Sprink, Trautzberg and Strotzbüsch. On the road from Strohn to Mückeln lies the Herrenbüsch where graves from Roman times can still be found. Some officers who were here on manoeuvres in 1875 had one such grave right at the roadside opened. Inside, they found jugs still filled with ashes, old coins, swords, amulets and lance heads.

== Politics ==
=== Municipal council ===
The council is made up of 12 council members, who were elected by majority vote at the municipal election held on 7 June 2009, and the honorary mayor as chairman. Before this last election, Strohn's council had eight seats.

=== Mayor ===
Strohn's mayor is Heinz Martin.

=== Coat of arms ===
The German blazon reads: Schild, durch eingeschobene silberne Spitze gespalten, darin eine rote Waage, vorne in Grün ein rotgezungter abgeschnittener goldener Löwenkopf, hinten in Grün ein silberner Mühlstein mit drei goldenen Ähren belegt.

The municipality's arms might in English heraldic language be described thus: Tierced in mantle, dexter vert a lion's head couped Or langued gules, sinister vert a millstone argent surmounted by three ears of wheat laid per pall reversed of the second, in base argent balances of the third.

The lion's head refers to Strohn's former status as a Springiersbach Abbey holding. The lion was a common charge in arms borne by abbots. Lions may still be seen in the sandstone coat of arms on a house in the outlying centre of Sprink, which was also a monasterial landholding, and on the hearth heating plate in the same house. The millstone and ears of wheat refer to Strohn's mills, of which one is still working today. The three ears also refer to agriculture, which is still important in the municipality. The balances are meant to stand for the high court at Strohn, belonging within whose jurisdiction were not only Strohn, but also Mückeln and Oberscheidweiler as well as the estates of Sprink and Trautzberg. The tinctures gules and argent (red and silver) stand for the Electorate of Trier; Strohn for centuries belonged to the Electoral-Trier Amt of Daun. The tincture vert (green) in the two upper divisions was chosen to stand for the "Strohn Switzerland" (Strohner Schweiz) – the Strohner Märchen and its scenic charm.

== Culture and sightseeing ==
=== Museums ===
Strohn has a museum dedicated to volcanoes, the Vulkanhaus.

=== Buildings ===
- Saint John the Baptist’s Catholic Parish Church (Pfarrkirche St. Johannes der Täufer), Kirchstraße 2 – west tower 1760, quire 1867, two-naved hall church 1909; sandstone shaft cross from 1716; red sandstone Heiligenhäuschen (a small, shrinelike structure consecrated to a saint or saints) from 1791.
- Hauptstraße 38 – Quereinhaus (a combination residential and commercial house divided for these two purposes down the middle, perpendicularly to the street).
- Hauptstraße 45 – estate complex; so-called Bockfachwerkhaus, a timber-frame house, early 19th century, commercial building, late 19th century.
- Hauptstraße/corner of Kastanienweg – Heiligenhäuschen, enclosed with wall with segmental arches, 18th/19th century.
- Obere Mühle, Zur Schweiz 32 – former mill.
- Sprinker Hof, Sprinker Hof 2 /3 – stately timber-frame house, partly solid, 18th/19th century.

== Economy and infrastructure ==
As well as the Vulkanhaus museum, Strohn also has marked hiking paths.
