= Springiersbach =

Monastery in Germany

Coordinates: 50°01′31″N 7°04′10″E

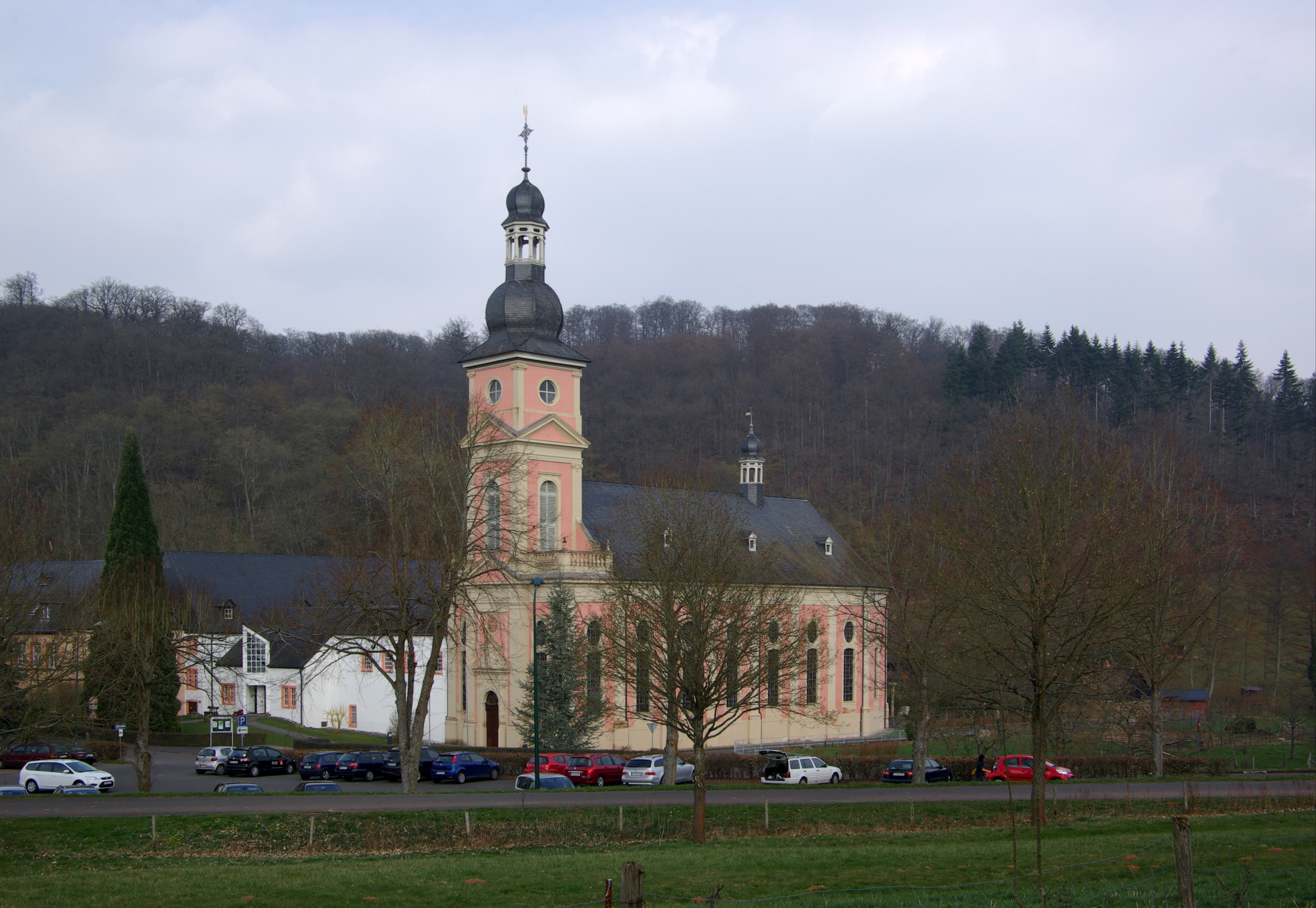
Springiersbach Monastery

Springiersbach Abbey is a former Augustinian (Canons Regular) monastery, and currently a Carmelite monastery in Bengel municipality, in the Eifel region of Rhineland-Palatinate, Germany.

== History ==
It was founded around 1102 by Bruno of Lauffen, archbishop of Trier, out of a bequest left to the church by a noble lady, Benigna von Daun. It was a double monastery under the Rule of Saint Augustine.

In 1107, the monastery became independent of the archbishopric, allowing the monks to elect their abbots freely. Entrance into the monastery was reserved for nobility, who would typically bequeath their lands to the monastery on entry. Construction of the abbey church began in 1123. The double monastery was abolished in 1128 with the establishment of the new women's monastery of St. Thomas in Andernach. Richard von Daun, son of Benigna, became the first abbot of the now men's monastery which was situated on his late father's farm.

In 1137 Albero de Montreuil, Archbishop of Trier, transferred his house at Stuben to Springiersbach for a house for Augustine canonesses, according to the wishes of his daughter Gisela, who wanted to live a life away from the world with her companions. Maria Martental Monastery in Leienkaul was founded about 1141 by Springiersbach, and soon became an important pilgrimage site. Kloster St. Irminen in Trier came under the supervision of Springiersbach in 1148 before reverting to Benedictine rule again in 1495. Peternach Monastery was founded near Boppard around 1157.

In 1769 the Romanesque structure was demolished and replaced with a new church in the Baroque style. The Augustinian convent was dissolved in the Napoleonic era, and the abbey church became the parish church of Bengel. In 1902 Bengel built its own parish church.

The Carmelite convent was established in 1922 from Bamberg. The convent was gutted by fire in 1940, but was reconstructed and restored.

== Present Day ==
As of 2023 seven Carmelites currently live at Springiersbach Monastery, primarily working as healthcare chaplains and parish pastors and at the neighbouring "Carmel Springiersbach" retreat and education facility.

Monthly concerts featuring well known soloists and orchestras are held in the church and the late-Romanesque chapter house. The abbey has also hosted music classes.

== Sources ==
- Karl-Josef Gilles und Erwin Schaaf: Springiersbach. Von der Augustiner-Chorherrenabtei zum Karmelitenkloster 1102–2002. (Schriftenreihe Ortschroniken des Trierer Landes, Band 36), Trier 2002, ISBN 3-928497-07-3.
