= Kondelwald =

- Location within Rhineland-Palatinate

Highest point
- Peak: Reudelheck
- Elevation: 477.5 m above NHN

Geography
- State(s): between Bengel and Bad Bertrich; counties of Bernkastel-Wittlich and Cochem-Zell, Rhineland-Palatinate, Germany
- Range coordinates: 50°02′46″N 7°02′30″E
- Parent range: Moselle Eifel (East Eifel)

The Kondelwald, also known as the Kondel, is a forest, about 2,500 hectares in area and up to 477.5 m above sea level (NHN), that forms part of the Moselle Eifel. It lies within the counties of Bernkastel-Wittlich and Cochem-Zell in the German state of Rhineland-Palatinate. It used to belong to the imperial Carolingian estate of Kröver Reich.

== Geography ==
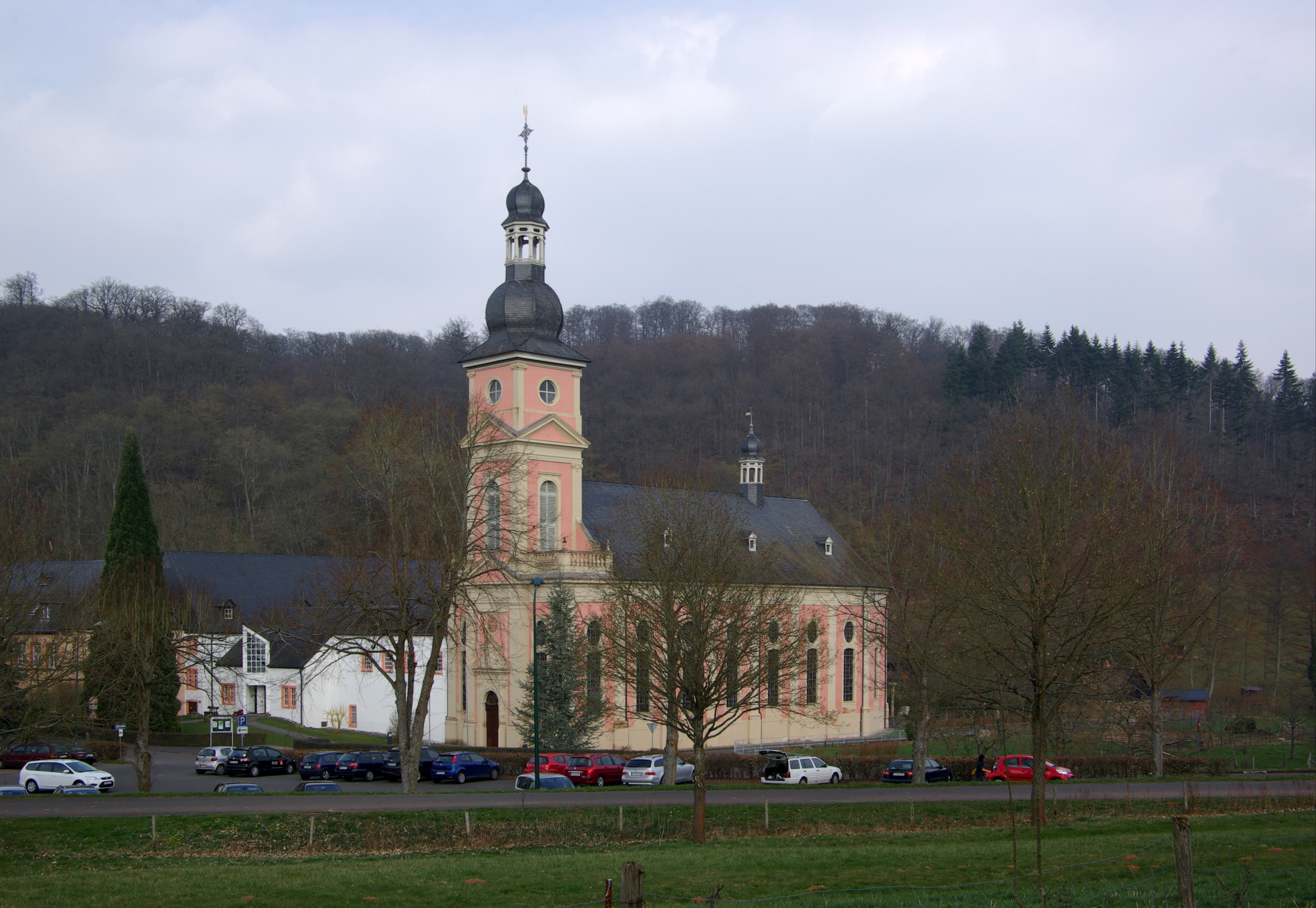
Springiersbach Abbey

=== Location ===
The Kondelwald is located east-northeast of Wittlich between the villages of Bengel on the Moselle tributary of Alf in the south and Bad Bertrich on the Alf tributary of Üßbach in the north. Its highest point lies between Bengel and the Hontheim village of Bonsbeuren about 750 metres as the crow flies west of the Waidmannsheil hunting lodge on the Reudelheck hill, near the road from Bengel to Bonsbeuren (Kreisstraßen 35 and 9). Near this point is a 77 metre high transmission tower (50°2′45.9″N 7°2′27.8″E). To the south, at Bengel, is Springiersbach Abbey.

=== Natural regions ===
The Kondelwald forms the subunit of Kondelwald (270.2) in the natural regional major unit group of East Eifel (No. 27) and major unit Moselle Eifel (270).
