= Bengel (Mosel) =

- Municipality
- Location of Bengel within Bernkastel-Wittlich district
- Interactive map of Bengel
- Location within Germany Location within Rhineland-Palatinate
- Coordinates: 50°00′58″N 07°03′51″E
- Country: Germany
- State: Rhineland-Palatinate
- District: Bernkastel-Wittlich
- Municipal assoc.: Traben-Trarbach
- Subdivisions: 3 Ortsteile

Government
  - Mayor (2019–24): Bruno Kihm

Area
  - Total: 27.44 km^{2} (10.59 sq mi)
- Elevation: 150 m (490 ft)

Population (2025-12-31)
  - Total: 824
  - Density: 30.0/km^{2} (77.8/sq mi)
- Time zone: UTC+01:00 (CET)
  - Summer (DST): UTC+02:00 (CEST)
- Postal codes: 54538
- Dialling codes: 06532
- Vehicle registration: WIL
- Website: www.gemeinde-bengel.de

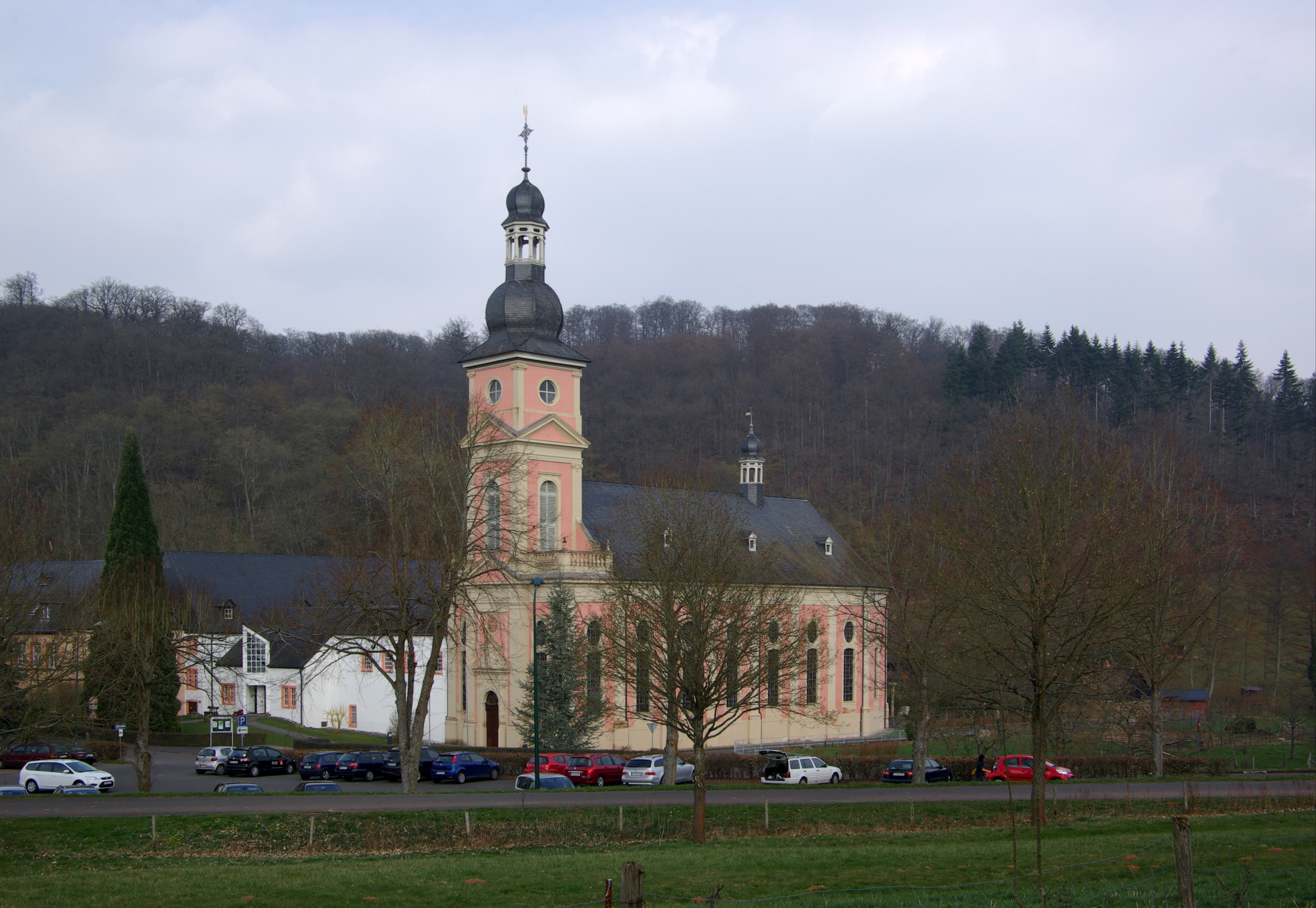
Springiersbach Monastery

Bengel (German pronunciation: [ˈbɛŋl̩]) is an Ortsgemeinde – a municipality belonging to a Verbandsgemeinde, a kind of collective municipality – in the Bernkastel-Wittlich district in Rhineland-Palatinate, Germany.

== Geography ==
=== Location ===
The municipality lies at the foot of the Eifel on the river Alf near the Moselle valley, has some 900 inhabitants and is found in the Middle Moselle-Kondelwald holiday region. The municipal area is 78% wooded. It belongs to the Verbandsgemeinde of Traben-Trarbach.

=== Constituent communities ===
Bengel's Ortsteile are Springiersbach and Neithof.

== History ==
In Springiersbach in 1102, the Augustinian Springiersbach Monastery was founded, to which the village of Bengel and also Neithof were assigned. Beginning in 1794, Bengel lay under French hegemony. In 1802, the church and the monastery in Springiersbach were secularized. To save the almost new church from being torn down, the Bishop of Trier raised it to Parish Church of Bengel. In 1815, the municipality was assigned to the Kingdom of Prussia at the Congress of Vienna. Since 1947, it has been part of the then newly founded state of Rhineland-Palatinate.

== Politics ==
The municipal council is made up of 12 council members, who were elected by majority vote at the municipal election held on 7 June 2009, and the honorary mayor as chairman.

== Culture and sightseeing ==
In the outlying centre of Springiersbach stands the Springiersbach Monastery, founded in 1102 as an Augustinian institution and since 1922 a Carmelite convent with a Rococo church. This has ceiling paintings and carved works that visitors may view. The convent was gutted by fire in 1940, but today has been restored and reconstructed.

== Economy and infrastructure ==
=== Transport ===
Through Bengel runs Bundesstraße 49. To the west runs the Autobahn A 1. The municipality has at its disposal a railway station on the Moselstrecke (Moselle line).
