= Ürzig =

- Municipality
- Coat of arms

- Location of Ürzig within Bernkastel-Wittlich district
- Interactive map of Ürzig
- Location within Germany Location within Rhineland-Palatinate
- Coordinates: 49°58′56″N 07°00′19″E
- Country: Germany
- State: Rhineland-Palatinate
- District: Bernkastel-Wittlich
- Municipal assoc.: Bernkastel-Kues

Government
  - Mayor (2019–24): Mirko Dornbach

Area
  - Total: 6.04 km^{2} (2.33 sq mi)
- Elevation: 104 m (341 ft)

Population (2025-12-31)
  - Total: 873
  - Density: 145/km^{2} (374/sq mi)
- Time zone: UTC+01:00 (CET)
  - Summer (DST): UTC+02:00 (CEST)
- Postal codes: 54539
- Dialling codes: 06532
- Vehicle registration: WIL
- Website: www.uerzig.de

Ürzig is an Ortsgemeinde – a municipality belonging to a Verbandsgemeinde, a kind of collective municipality – in the Bernkastel-Wittlich district in Rhineland-Palatinate, Germany.

== Geography ==
=== Location ===
The municipality lies surrounded by vineyards in the great bend in the Moselle between Bernkastel-Kues and Traben-Trarbach, not far from Trier. Ürzig is found on the river’s left bank, where very steep slopes rise up to the Eifel. Over the other side of the Moselle, the valley broadens out onto very flat countryside that eventually runs up against the Hunsrück.

Ürzig belongs to the Verbandsgemeinde of Bernkastel-Kues, whose seat is in the like-named town.

=== Nearby municipalities ===
Neighbouring municipalities are, among others, Kinheim, Erden, Lösnich and also Zeltingen-Rachtig. The nearest middle centres are the double town of Bernkastel-Kues, some 9 km away, and the district seat, Wittlich, some 8 km away. Trier lies some 37 km away.

=== Population ===
The population density is 150 inhabitants per square kilometre. The local speech in the region is Moselle Franconian (Moselfränkisch), part of the Central Franconian dialect group.

=== Climate ===
Ürzig lies in a transitional zone between temperate oceanic climate and continental climate; compared to other regions in Germany, a very warm and sunny climate prevails here. In nearby Brauneberg on 11 August 1998, a record temperature of 41.2 °C in the shade, the highest ever air temperature recorded in the Federal Republic, was confirmed at the Meteomedia weather station by Jörg Kachelmann (however, Brauneberg is not said to be Germany’s number-one hotspot because the weather station is not included in official measurements owing to its location on a slate mountain).

The barrier formed by the Eifel shields Ürzig from west winds, putting it in a rain shadow and sometimes subjecting it to a föhn effect. At the same time, the warming of the air is favoured by the only slight exchange of air with the surrounding area. Tied in with this is the high humidity due to ongoing evaporation of water from the Moselle, which, especially in summer, makes at times for heavy and muggy weather, and which also brings many storms along with it.

== History ==
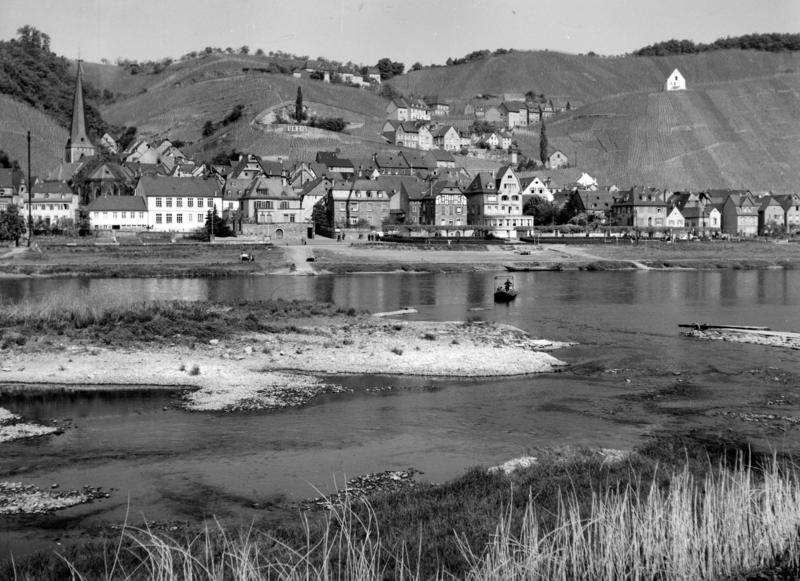
Ürzig, 1954

In the surrounding areas, remnants of settlement from the Bronze Age have been found. About 500 BC, the Treveri, a people of mixed Celtic and Germanic stock, from whom the Latin name for the city of Trier, Augusta Treverorum, is also derived, settled the region around Trier. Following the Treveri, from roughly 50 BC until AD 500 were the Romans. From times of yore, winegrowing has been an important factor in the economy; foremost among the winegrowers that plied their trade in Ürzig were the monastic wineries, such as Himmerod Abbey and the Springiersbach Carmelite Monastery, whose estates are still preserved.

== Politics ==
=== Municipal council ===
The council is made up of 12 council members, who were elected by proportional representation at the municipal election held on 7 June 2009, and the honorary mayor as chairman.

The municipal election held on 7 June 2009 yielded the following results:

Year	VBB	Simon	Loosen	Total
2009	1	7	4	12 seats

=== Town partnerships ===
Ürzig fosters partnerships with the following places:

- Aloxe-Corton, Côte-d'Or, France

== Culture and sightseeing ==
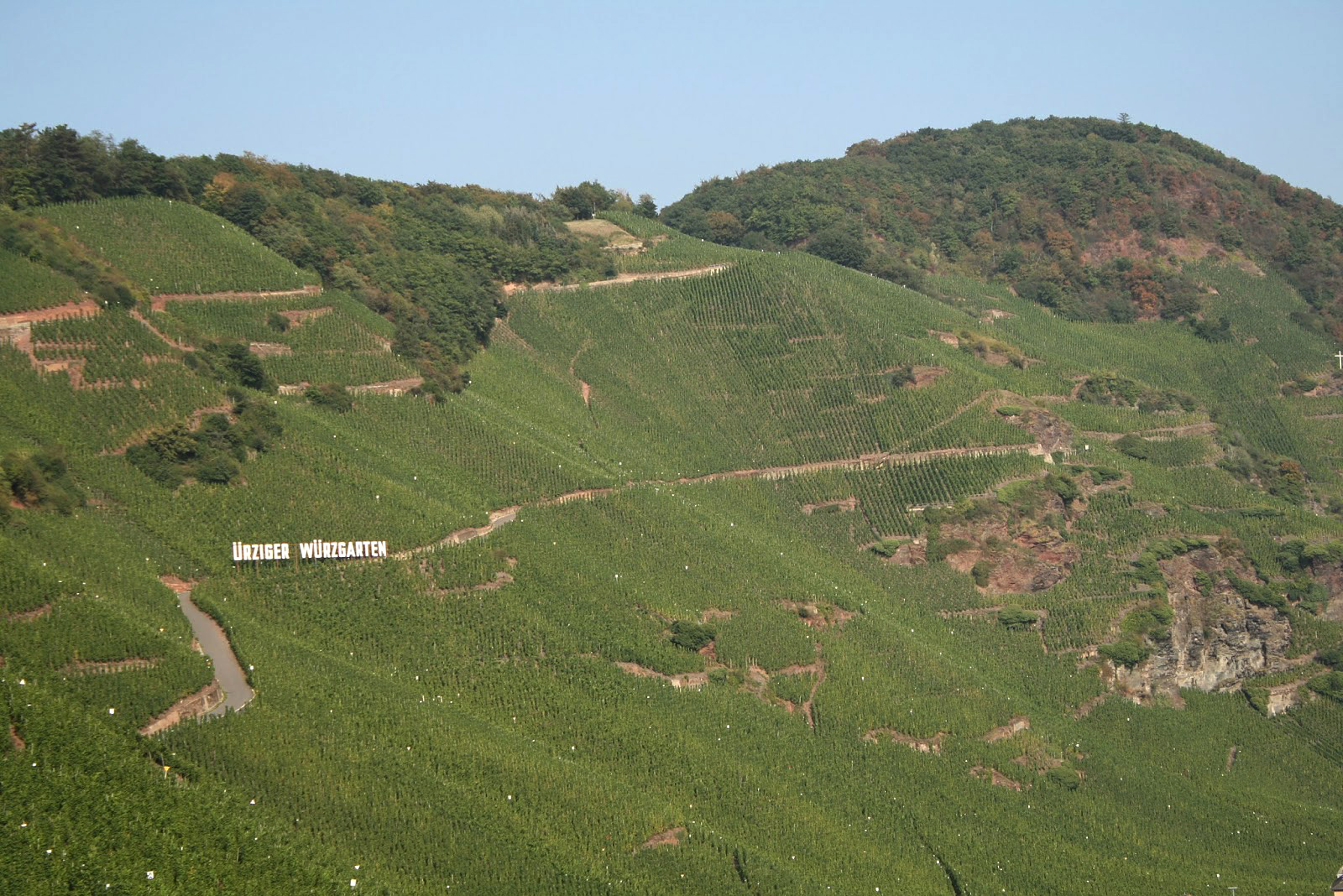
View of the Ürziger Würzgarten vineyard, near Bernkastel-Kues, Germany

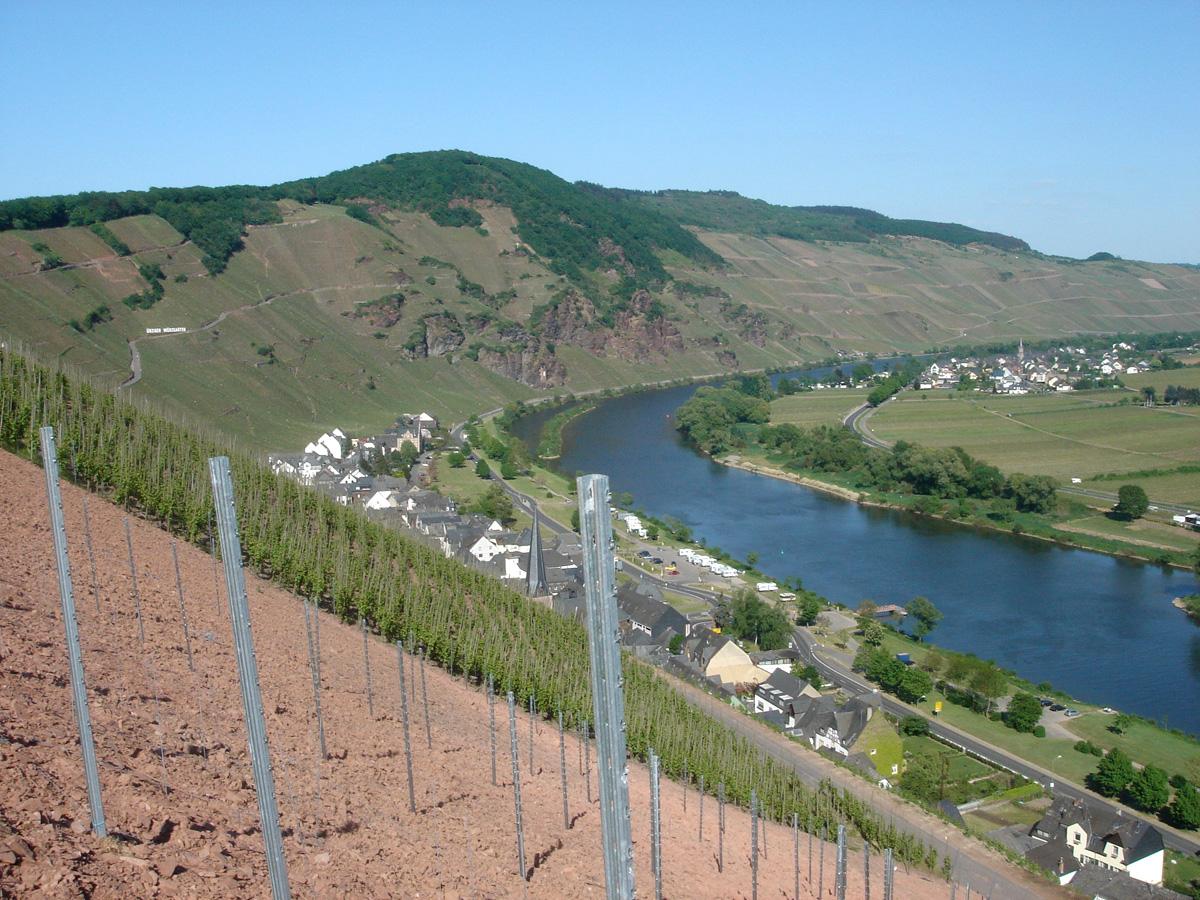
Another view of the Ürziger Würzgarten

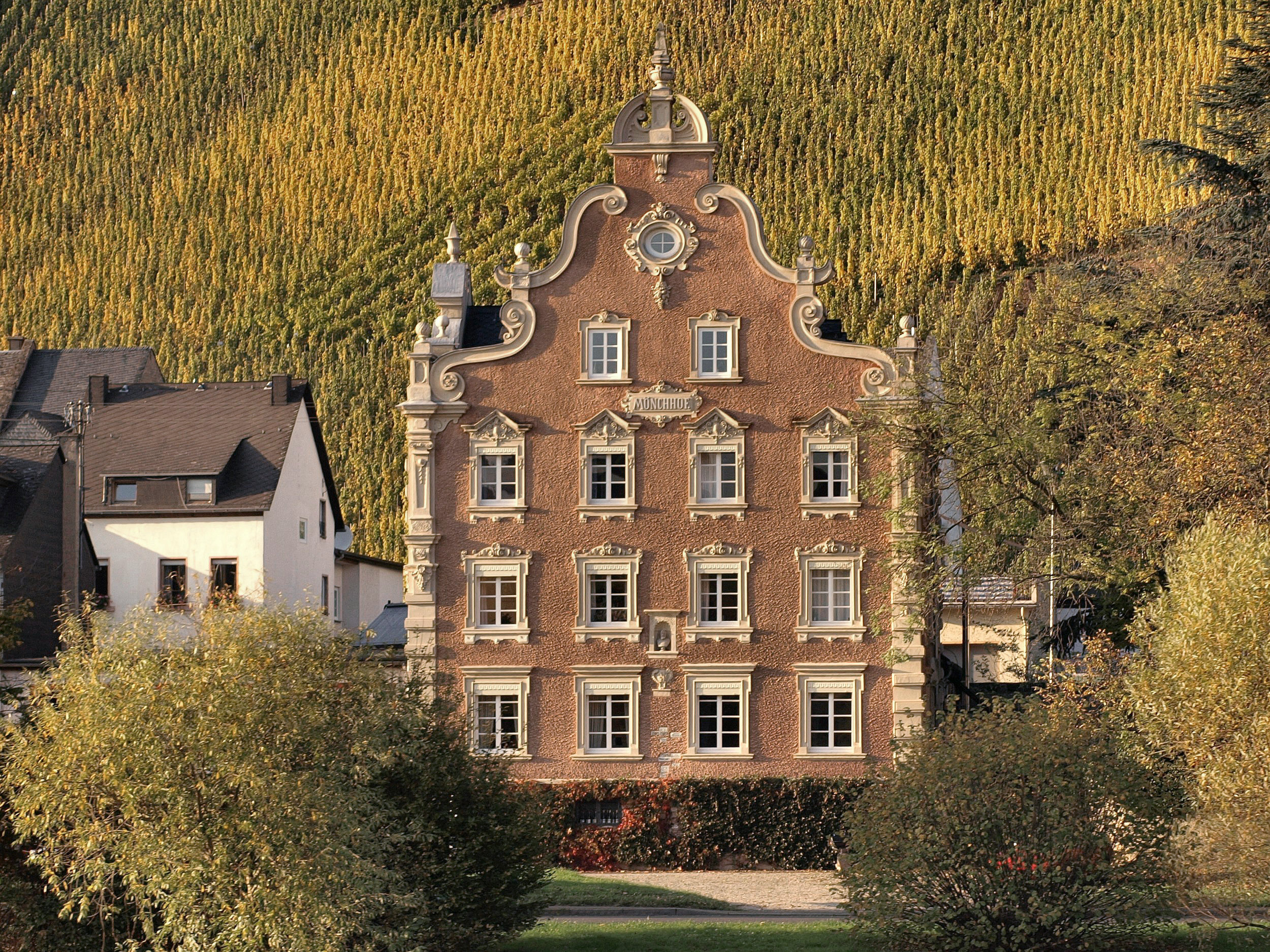
Mönchhof in Ürzig

=== Village culture ===
Ürzig is characterized by little lanes and nooks as well as patrician and timber-frame houses in the historical village centre. Knightly families once built three castles here, only one of which has been preserved, and that only as ruins. At the remnants of an old watchtower in the vineyards, a sundial has been installed. In Ürzig, there exist even today several wineries, which mainly grow Riesling. The best known vineyard is the Ürziger Würzgarten, although there is also the less well known Ürziger Goldwingert. The Baroque Mönchhof on the promenade served in the late 1980s as a backdrop in the television series Moselbrück.

== Economy and infrastructure ==
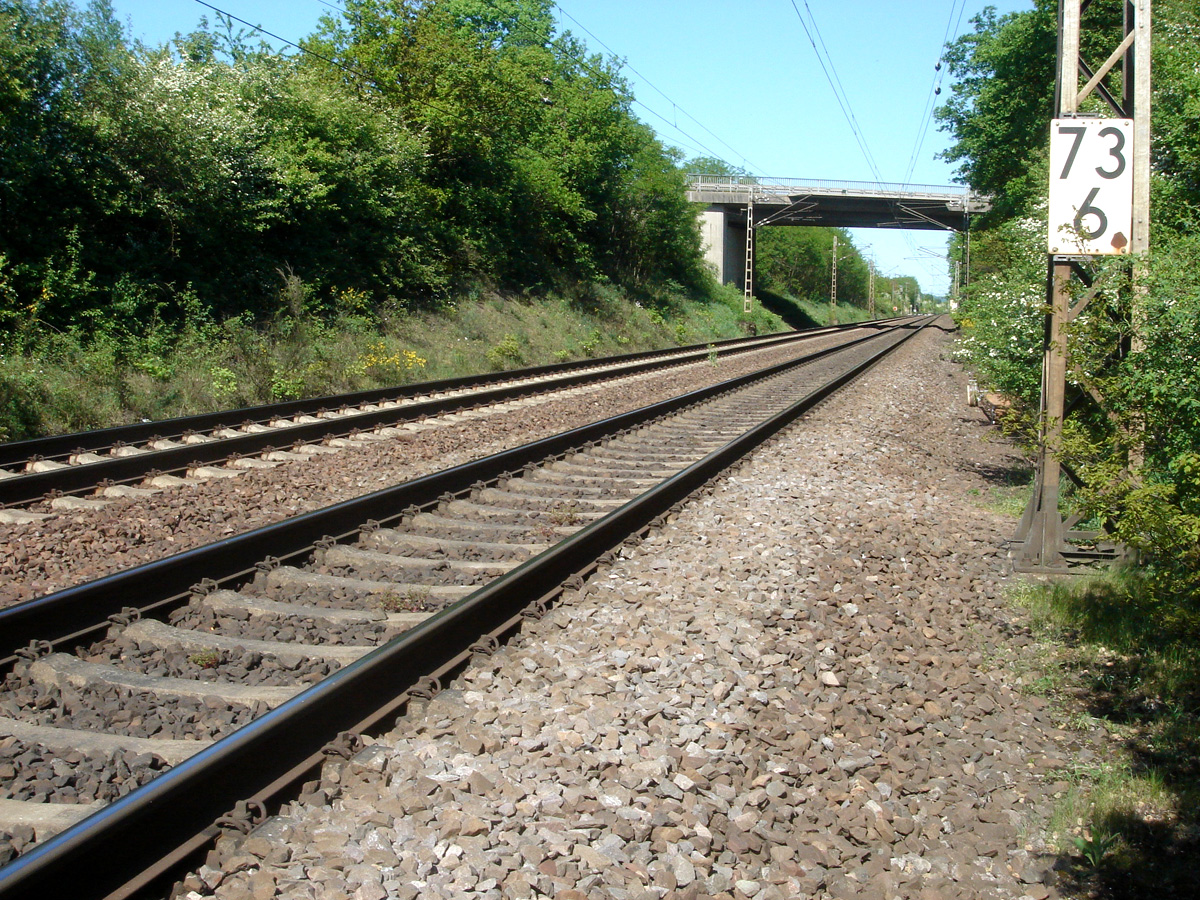
DB Moselle line near Ürzig

Winegrowing and tourism play a prominent rôle. Public transport is integrated into the Verkehrsverbund Region Trier (VRT), whose fares therefore apply. It has a station on the Koblenz–Trier line. Right near Ürzig, the Hochmoselbrücke is planned as part of the Hochmoselübergang (Bundesstraße 50).

== Famous people ==
=== Sons and daughters of the town ===
- Christian Dieden (1810–1898) politician
- Karl Christoffel (1895–1986) historian and writer
- Dr. John J. Grebe (1900-1984) physicist inventor for Dow Chemical
- Edmund Conen (1914–1990) national footballer
- Günter Eymael (1952– ) politician
