= Darscheid =

- Municipality
- Coat of arms

- Location of Darscheid within Vulkaneifel district
- Interactive map of Darscheid
- Location within Germany Location within Rhineland-Palatinate
- Coordinates: 50°12′52″N 6°53′28″E
- Country: Germany
- State: Rhineland-Palatinate
- District: Vulkaneifel
- Municipal assoc.: Daun

Government
  - Mayor (2019–24): Ulrich Johann

Area
  - Total: 5.80 km^{2} (2.24 sq mi)
- Elevation: 490 m (1,610 ft)

Population (2025-12-31)
  - Total: 947
  - Density: 163/km^{2} (423/sq mi)
- Time zone: UTC+01:00 (CET)
  - Summer (DST): UTC+02:00 (CEST)
- Postal codes: 54552
- Dialling codes: 06592
- Vehicle registration: DAU
- Website: www.darscheid.de

Darscheid is an Ortsgemeinde – a municipality belonging to a Verbandsgemeinde, a kind of collective municipality – in the Vulkaneifel district in Rhineland-Palatinate, Germany. It belongs to the Verbandsgemeinde of Daun, whose seat is in the like-named town.

== Geography ==
=== Location ===
The municipality lies in the Vulkaneifel, a part of the Eifel known for its volcanic history, geographical and geological features, and even ongoing activity today, including gases that sometimes well up from the earth. The Alfbach also rises nearby.

== History ==
Darscheid’s parish and school chronicle tells a story about how the three villages in the Alfbach’s headwaters came into being. Three brothers, the reader is told, came and settled here from faraway lands and divided the land amongst themselves, saying “Hier ist ein Scheid, da ist ein Scheid und unten ist für alle ein Scheid.” (“Here is a share, there is a share and below is for all a share”). From these “shares” or “splits” arose three farms that later grew into villages: Hörscheid (Hier + Scheid), Darscheid (Da + Scheid) and Allscheid (Alle + Scheid).

More steadily based on historical fact, though, is the Celtic presence in the area. They settled the Eifel as livestock raisers, and it may be assumed that they were in what is now Darscheid as well, as witnessed by the barrows in the nearby Lehwald (woods), which were explored in the late 19th century and determined to date from the early Iron Age – Hallstatt times.

In the Middle Ages, Darscheid was quite a poor village out in the heath, like so many in the Eifel. Thatched timber-frame houses gathered around a 14th-century chapel. Darscheid had its first documentary mention in 1354, at which time it lay under the Counts of Daun. After they died in 1420, the lordship passed to the Counts of Manderscheid. There followed a long period of serfdom, compulsory labour and economic woes. Even after serfdom was abolished, things got no better, and many people heeded the promises of a better life from Empress Maria Theresa’s settler recruiter in 1754 and left the village for a new life in Hungary.

The 19th century brought the Eifel dwellers yet more in the way of economic hardship, leading to a further wave of emigration, this time to North America. In about 1852, sixty-seven people left Darscheid and went abroad. Only in the 1890s did the situation begin to improve. The spruce trees that had been planted beginning in 1830 were at last yielding income. Farm work was made easier by the reorganization of splintered farmland into bigger plots. Chemical fertilizer boosted crop yields. Further jobs and therefore earnings came with the Daun-Darscheid-Mayen railway, completed in 1895. This also spurred growth in trade and transport, raising Darscheid, as a railway centre, to a higher economic position. This further allowed the municipality, among other things, to build a new school in 1901, the old timber-frame one, built in 1838, having outlived its usefulness.

Over the next few decades, growth continued. The Lower Village swelled until it reached the railway track, a railway goods station opened, followed by a sawmill in 1919, there was electric light in 1921 and a public water supply by 1927. Between 1923 and 1924, three new bakehouses were built to afford the villagers a place to bake their bread. This was an important institution in those days, as people seldom had ovens in their own homes. Darscheid discovered tourism in 1924 when the youth hostel was opened.

A census on 16 June 1933 showed that there were 409 inhabitants in Darscheid. At about this time, Adolf Hitler came to power in Germany and the Third Reich began. The onset of the Second World War depleted the ranks of working men as they were called into the Wehrmacht; jobs were taken over by women and older men. Also put to work were prisoners of war, both men and women, from Russia, France and Poland, who worked the land. Most of these were billeted with local families in the hope that the local husbands and sons fighting in the war would be well supplied by people in the occupied lands.

After the war, agriculture began to lose its economic importance as the flight to the cities began. By about 1997, the last locally owned agricultural business was forsaken by its owner, and all farming in Darscheid is now handled by a large company. Furthermore, the old youth hostel closed in 1976 after 50 years and the building now houses a home for emotionally needy adults, as does the old railway station. This service is run by the Weggemeinschaft Vulkaneifel.

The railway itself is still in use, but only hourly local trains are now in the summer months. For a decade, between January 1991 and early 2001, there was no passenger service at all.

== Politics ==
=== Municipal council ===
The council is made up of 12 council members, who were elected by majority vote at the municipal election held on 7 June 2009, and the honorary mayor as chairman.

=== Coat of arms ===
The German blazon reads: In Grün ein goldener Schräglinksbalken, belegt mit einer roten Zickzackleiste. Oben ein silbernes Horn, unten ein schräg aufgerichtetes silbernes Schwert.

The municipality’s arms might in English heraldic language be described thus: Vert a bend sinister Or surmounted by a bendlet dancetty gules, in dexter a horn and in sinister a sword in bend sinister, the pommel to base, both argent.

The bend sinister (diagonal stripe) surmounted by the bendlet dancetty (narrow zigzag stripe) is taken from the arms borne by the Counts of Manderscheid-Kail and Manderscheid-Schleiden, who according to Weistümer (a Weistum – cognate with English wisdom – was a legal pronouncement issued by men learned in law in the Middle Ages and early modern times) from the 15th century held a jurisdictional estate (Dinghof) here.

The horn refers to the municipality’s patron saint, Cornelius.

The sword refers to “Thommen”, the old execution place. Executions of the condemned from the tithe villages of Brockscheid, Darscheid, Ellscheid, Mehren, Rengen, Schalkenmehren, Schönbach, Trittscheid, Udler, Üdersdorf and to some extent, Strohn took place here.

== Culture and sightseeing ==
=== Buildings ===
- Holy Cross Parish Church (Pfarrkirche Heilig Kreuz, 1969)
- Former railway station building from 1906, under monumental protection
- Graveyard with old sandstone crosses set in the wall
- Barrows

== Transport ==
Darscheid train stop is located at Cross Eifel Railway from Andernach via Mayen and Ulmen to Gerolstein although the section from Kaisersesch to Gerolstein right now it is out of service.

=== Natural monuments ===
- Juniper heath
- Bird conservation wood
