= Mosel/Rhein-Hunsrück =

Federal electoral district of Germany

199 Mosel/Rhein-Hunsrück
- Electoral district for the Bundestag
- Mosel/Rhein-Hunsrück in 2025
- State: Rhineland-Palatinate
- Population: 218,900 (2019)
- Electorate: 168,634 (2025)
- Major settlements: Boppard; Morbach; Simmern
- Area: 2,287.7 km^{2}

Current electoral district
- Created: 1949
- Party: CDU
- Member: Marlon Bröhr
- Elected: 2021, 2025

Mosel/Rhein-Hunsrück is an electoral constituency (German: Wahlkreis) represented in the Bundestag. It elects one member via first-past-the-post voting. Under the current constituency numbering system, it is designated as constituency 199. It is located in central Rhineland-Palatinate, comprising the Cochem-Zell district, Rhein-Hunsrück-Kreis district, and the southern part of the Bernkastel-Wittlich district.

Mosel/Rhein-Hunsrück was created for the inaugural 1949 federal election. Since 2021, it has been represented by Marlon Bröhr of the Christian Democratic Union (CDU).

== Geography ==
Mosel/Rhein-Hunsrück is located in central Rhineland-Palatinate. As of the 2021 federal election, it comprises the entirety of the Cochem-Zell and Rhein-Hunsrück-Kreis districts as well as, from the Bernkastel-Wittlich district, the municipality of Morbach, the Verbandsgemeinden of Bernkastel-Kues and Thalfang am Erbeskopf, and the municipalities of Burg (Mosel), Enkirch, Irmenach, Lötzbeuren, Starkenburg, and Traben-Trarbach from the Traben-Trarbach Verbandsgemeinde.

== History ==
Mosel/Rhein-Hunsrück was created in 1949, then known as Cochem. It acquired its current name in the 2002 election. In the 1949 election, it was Rhineland-Palatinate constituency 4 in the numbering system. In the 1953 through 1976 elections, it was number 151. In the 1980 through 1998 elections, it was number 149. In the 2002 election, it was number 203. In the 2005 election, it was number 202. In the 2009 and 2013 elections, it was number 201. In the 2017 and 2021 elections, it was number 200. From the 2025 election, it has been number 199.

Originally, the constituency comprised the districts of Cochem, Zell, Simmern, and Bernkastel. In the 1972 through 1998 elections, it comprised the Cochem-Zell district; the Verbandsgemeinden of Kastellaun, Kirchberg, Rheinböllen, and Simmern/Hunsrück from the Rhein-Hunsrück-Kreis district; and the municipality of Morbach and the Verbandsgemeinden of Bernkastel-Kues, Neumagen-Dhron, Thalfang am Erbeskopf, and Traben-Trarbach from the Bernkastel-Wittlich district. It acquired its current borders in the 2002 election, although when the former Verbandsgemeinde of Neumagen-Dhron was merged into the Traben-Trarbach Verbandsgemeinde in 2012, its area was not incorporated into the constituency.

Election	No.	Name	Borders
1949	4	Cochem	Cochem district; Zell district; Simmern district; Bernkastel district
1953	151	Cochem	Cochem district; Zell district; Simmern district; Bernkastel district
1957	151	Cochem	Cochem district; Zell district; Simmern district; Bernkastel district
1961	151	Cochem	Cochem district; Zell district; Simmern district; Bernkastel district
1965	151	Cochem	Cochem district; Zell district; Simmern district; Bernkastel district
1969	151	Cochem	Cochem district; Zell district; Simmern district; Bernkastel district
1972	151	Cochem	Cochem-Zell district; Rhein-Hunsrück-Kreis district (only Kastellaun, Kirchberg, Rheinböllen, and Simmern/Hunsrück Verbandsgemeinden); Bernkastel-Wittlich district (only Morbach municipality and Bernkastel-Kues, Neumagen-Dhron, Thalfang am Erbeskopf, and Traben-Trarbach Verbandsgemeinden)
1976	151	Cochem	Cochem-Zell district; Rhein-Hunsrück-Kreis district (only Kastellaun, Kirchberg, Rheinböllen, and Simmern/Hunsrück Verbandsgemeinden); Bernkastel-Wittlich district (only Morbach municipality and Bernkastel-Kues, Neumagen-Dhron, Thalfang am Erbeskopf, and Traben-Trarbach Verbandsgemeinden)
1980	149	Cochem	Cochem-Zell district; Rhein-Hunsrück-Kreis district (only Kastellaun, Kirchberg, Rheinböllen, and Simmern/Hunsrück Verbandsgemeinden); Bernkastel-Wittlich district (only Morbach municipality and Bernkastel-Kues, Neumagen-Dhron, Thalfang am Erbeskopf, and Traben-Trarbach Verbandsgemeinden)
1983	149	Cochem	Cochem-Zell district; Rhein-Hunsrück-Kreis district (only Kastellaun, Kirchberg, Rheinböllen, and Simmern/Hunsrück Verbandsgemeinden); Bernkastel-Wittlich district (only Morbach municipality and Bernkastel-Kues, Neumagen-Dhron, Thalfang am Erbeskopf, and Traben-Trarbach Verbandsgemeinden)
1987	149	Cochem	Cochem-Zell district; Rhein-Hunsrück-Kreis district (only Kastellaun, Kirchberg, Rheinböllen, and Simmern/Hunsrück Verbandsgemeinden); Bernkastel-Wittlich district (only Morbach municipality and Bernkastel-Kues, Neumagen-Dhron, Thalfang am Erbeskopf, and Traben-Trarbach Verbandsgemeinden)
1990	149	Cochem	Cochem-Zell district; Rhein-Hunsrück-Kreis district (only Kastellaun, Kirchberg, Rheinböllen, and Simmern/Hunsrück Verbandsgemeinden); Bernkastel-Wittlich district (only Morbach municipality and Bernkastel-Kues, Neumagen-Dhron, Thalfang am Erbeskopf, and Traben-Trarbach Verbandsgemeinden)
1994	149	Cochem	Cochem-Zell district; Rhein-Hunsrück-Kreis district (only Kastellaun, Kirchberg, Rheinböllen, and Simmern/Hunsrück Verbandsgemeinden); Bernkastel-Wittlich district (only Morbach municipality and Bernkastel-Kues, Neumagen-Dhron, Thalfang am Erbeskopf, and Traben-Trarbach Verbandsgemeinden)
1998	149	Cochem	Cochem-Zell district; Rhein-Hunsrück-Kreis district (only Kastellaun, Kirchberg, Rheinböllen, and Simmern/Hunsrück Verbandsgemeinden); Bernkastel-Wittlich district (only Morbach municipality and Bernkastel-Kues, Neumagen-Dhron, Thalfang am Erbeskopf, and Traben-Trarbach Verbandsgemeinden)
2002	203	Mosel/Rhein-Hunsrück	Cochem-Zell district; Rhein-Hunsrück-Kreis district; Bernkastel-Wittlich district (only Morbach municipality and Bernkastel-Kues, Thalfang am Erbeskopf, and Traben-Trarbach (only Burg (Mosel), Enkirch, Irmenach, Lötzbeuren, Starkenburg, and Traben-Trarbach municipalities) Verbandsgemeinden)
2005	202	Mosel/Rhein-Hunsrück	Cochem-Zell district; Rhein-Hunsrück-Kreis district; Bernkastel-Wittlich district (only Morbach municipality and Bernkastel-Kues, Thalfang am Erbeskopf, and Traben-Trarbach (only Burg (Mosel), Enkirch, Irmenach, Lötzbeuren, Starkenburg, and Traben-Trarbach municipalities) Verbandsgemeinden)
2009	201	Mosel/Rhein-Hunsrück	Cochem-Zell district; Rhein-Hunsrück-Kreis district; Bernkastel-Wittlich district (only Morbach municipality and Bernkastel-Kues, Thalfang am Erbeskopf, and Traben-Trarbach (only Burg (Mosel), Enkirch, Irmenach, Lötzbeuren, Starkenburg, and Traben-Trarbach municipalities) Verbandsgemeinden)
2013	201	Mosel/Rhein-Hunsrück	Cochem-Zell district; Rhein-Hunsrück-Kreis district; Bernkastel-Wittlich district (only Morbach municipality and Bernkastel-Kues, Thalfang am Erbeskopf, and Traben-Trarbach (only Burg (Mosel), Enkirch, Irmenach, Lötzbeuren, Starkenburg, and Traben-Trarbach municipalities) Verbandsgemeinden)
2017	200	Mosel/Rhein-Hunsrück	Cochem-Zell district; Rhein-Hunsrück-Kreis district; Bernkastel-Wittlich district (only Morbach municipality and Bernkastel-Kues, Thalfang am Erbeskopf, and Traben-Trarbach (only Burg (Mosel), Enkirch, Irmenach, Lötzbeuren, Starkenburg, and Traben-Trarbach municipalities) Verbandsgemeinden)
2021	200	Mosel/Rhein-Hunsrück	Cochem-Zell district; Rhein-Hunsrück-Kreis district; Bernkastel-Wittlich district (only Morbach municipality and Bernkastel-Kues, Thalfang am Erbeskopf, and Traben-Trarbach (only Burg (Mosel), Enkirch, Irmenach, Lötzbeuren, Starkenburg, and Traben-Trarbach municipalities) Verbandsgemeinden)
2025	199	Mosel/Rhein-Hunsrück	Cochem-Zell district; Rhein-Hunsrück-Kreis district; Bernkastel-Wittlich district (only Morbach municipality and Bernkastel-Kues, Thalfang am Erbeskopf, and Traben-Trarbach (only Burg (Mosel), Enkirch, Irmenach, Lötzbeuren, Starkenburg, and Traben-Trarbach municipalities) Verbandsgemeinden)

== Members ==
The constituency has been held continuously by the Christian Democratic Union (CDU) since its creation. It was first represented by Paul Gibbert from 1949 to 1969. Klaus Bremm then served from 1969 to 1976. He was succeeded by Waltrud Will-Feld, who was representative until 1990. Peter Bleser was elected in 1990 and served until 2021, a total of eight consecutive terms. He was succeeded by Marlon Bröhr in 2021, and was re-elected in 2025.

Election	Member	Party	%
1949	Paul Gibbert	CDU	66.6
1953	Paul Gibbert	CDU	67.2
1957	Paul Gibbert	CDU	65.4
1961	Paul Gibbert	CDU	60.7
1965	Paul Gibbert	CDU	63.5
1969	Klaus Bremm	CDU	58.0
1972	Klaus Bremm	CDU	58.1
1976	Waltrud Will-Feld	CDU	60.5
1980	Waltrud Will-Feld	CDU	57.5
1983	Waltrud Will-Feld	CDU	61.4
1987	Waltrud Will-Feld	CDU	55.6
1990	Peter Bleser	CDU	53.0
1994	Peter Bleser	CDU	53.6
1998	Peter Bleser	CDU	49.7
2002	Peter Bleser	CDU	48.8
2005	Peter Bleser	CDU	50.1
2009	Peter Bleser	CDU	47.7
2013	Peter Bleser	CDU	53.6
2017	Peter Bleser	CDU	44.1
2021	Marlon Bröhr	CDU	34.3
2025	Marlon Bröhr	CDU	38.2

== Election results ==
=== 2025 election ===
Federal election (2025): Mosel/Rhein-Hunsrück
Notes:	Blue background denotes the winner of the electorate vote. Pink background denotes a candidate elected from their party list. Yellow background denotes an electorate win by a list member, or other incumbent. A ✓ or ✗ denotes status of any incumbent, win or lose respectively.						
Party	Candidate	Votes	%	±%	Party votes	%	±%
CDU	✓ Marlon Bröhr	53,505	38.2	▲3.9	49,309	34.9	▲5.9
AfD	Jörg Zirwes	27,058	19.3	▲11.3	27,721	19.6	▲11.3
SPD	Umut Kurt	27,079	19.3	▼7.6	25,141	17.8	▼10.7
Greens	Julian-Béla Joswig	10,039	7.2	▼2.5	10,918	7.7	▼1.4
FDP	Carina Konrad	7,588	5.4	▼6.4	7,521	5.3	▼7.2
Left	Alexandra Erikson	6,495	4.6	New	7,411	5.2	▲2.5
BSW					5,594	4.0	New
FW	Guido Hübinger	6,009	4.3	▼1.5	3,669	2.6	▼1.8
Tierschutzpartei					1,709	1.2	▼0.2
Volt	Detlef Barsuhn	1,279	0.9	▲0.1	856	0.6	0.0
PARTEI					685	0.5	▼0.3
ÖDP	Gergor Doege	1,130	0.8	▲0.1	412	0.3	0.0
BD					254	0.2	New
MLPD					22	<0.1	0.0
Informal votes		2,098			1,058		
Total valid votes		140,182			141,222		
Turnout		142,280	84.4	▲5.6			
CDU hold	Majority	26,426	18.9	▲11.5			

=== 2021 election ===
Federal election (2021): Mosel/Rhein-Hunsrück
Notes:	Blue background denotes the winner of the electorate vote. Pink background denotes a candidate elected from their party list. Yellow background denotes an electorate win by a list member, or other incumbent. A ✓ or ✗ denotes status of any incumbent, win or lose respectively.						
Party	Candidate	Votes	%	±%	Party votes	%	±%
CDU	Marlon Bröhr	45,364	34.3	▼9.8	38,664	29.0	▼12.6
SPD	Michael Maurer	35,570	26.9	▲1.7	38,015	28.5	▲5.5
FDP	Carina Konrad	15,664	11.8	▲3.1	16,664	12.5	▲1.3
Greens	Julian Joswig	12,833	9.7	▲4.8	12,230	9.2	▲3.6
AfD	Harald Bechberger	10,646	8.0	▼0.1	11,061	8.3	▼0.7
FW	Heinz Wößner	7,609	5.7	▲2.9	5,820	4.4	▲3.1
Left					3,725	2.8	▼3.3
Tierschutzpartei					1,845	1.4	
dieBasis	Wolfgang Link	2,334	1.8		1,770	1.3	
PARTEI					1,099	0.8	▼0.1
Volt	Detlef Barsuhn	1,124	0.8		751	0.6	
Pirates					506	0.4	0.0
ÖDP	Erik Hofmann	976	0.7	▼0.1	374	0.3	▼0.1
Independent	Hermann Krämer	249	0.2				
Team Todenhöfer					237	0.2	
NPD					124	0.1	▼0.1
V-Partei3					123	0.1	▼0.2
Humanists					95	0.1	
DiB					89	0.1	
LKR					51	0.0	
MLPD					19	0.0	0.0
Informal votes		2,348			1,455		
Total valid votes		132,369			133,262		
Turnout		134,717	78.7	▲0.3			
CDU hold	Majority	9,794	7.4	▼11.5			

=== 2017 election ===
Federal election (2017): Mosel/Rhein-Hunsrück
Notes:	Blue background denotes the winner of the electorate vote. Pink background denotes a candidate elected from their party list. Yellow background denotes an electorate win by a list member, or other incumbent. A ✓ or ✗ denotes status of any incumbent, win or lose respectively.						
Party	Candidate	Votes	%	±%	Party votes	%	±%
CDU	✓ Peter Bleser	58,596	44.1	▼9.5	55,606	41.6	▼7.8
SPD	Ivonne Horbert	33,477	25.2	▼2.7	30,799	23.0	▼1.5
FDP	Carina Konrad	11,544	8.7	▲5.5	14,924	11.2	▲4.9
AfD	Martin Fischer	10,834	8.2		11,996	9.0	▲4.8
Left	Alexandra Erikson	7,040	5.3	▲0.8	8,143	6.1	▲1.3
Greens	Ralf Kauer	6,465	4.9	▼0.8	7,487	5.6	▼0.1
FW	Willi Feilen	3,741	2.8	▼0.3	1,708	1.3	▼0.1
PARTEI					1,182	0.9	
ÖDP	Johannes Schneider	1,131	0.9	▲0.2	491	0.4	0.0
Pirates					464	0.3	▼1.5
V-Partei³					349	0.3	
NPD					306	0.2	▼0.6
BGE					217	0.2	
MLPD					32	0.0	0.0
Informal votes		2,691			1,815		
Total valid votes		132,828			133,704		
Turnout		135,519	78.4	▲4.7			
CDU hold	Majority	25,119	18.9	▼6.8			

=== 2013 election ===
Federal election (2013): Mosel/Rhein-Hunsrück
Notes:	Blue background denotes the winner of the electorate vote. Pink background denotes a candidate elected from their party list. Yellow background denotes an electorate win by a list member, or other incumbent. A ✓ or ✗ denotes status of any incumbent, win or lose respectively.						
Party	Candidate	Votes	%	±%	Party votes	%	±%
CDU	✓ Peter Bleser	67,658	53.6	▲6.0	62,703	49.4	▲10.0
SPD	Anja Bindges	35,146	27.9	▲4.1	31,202	24.6	▲3.8
Left	Martin Krötz	5,647	4.5	▼2.7	6,139	4.8	▼3.4
Greens	Joscha Pullich	5,083	4.0	▼3.7	7,257	5.7	▼2.3
FDP	Werner Wöllstein	3,990	3.2	▼9.3	7,948	6.3	▼12.7
AfD					5,323	4.2	
FW	Wilhelm Feilen	3,918	3.1		1,698	1.3	
Pirates	Markus Weber	2,606	2.1		2,352	1.9	▲0.3
NPD	Jens Simon Willi	1,273	1.0	▼0.2	1,057	0.8	▼0.1
ÖDP	Erik Hofmann	830	0.7		477	0.4	▲0.2
Party of Reason					318	0.3	
PRO					282	0.2	
REP					160	0.1	▼0.3
MLPD					36	0.0	0.0
Informal votes		3,111			2,310		
Total valid votes		126,151			126,952		
Turnout		129,262	73.7	▲1.1			
CDU hold	Majority	32,512	25.7	▲1.7			

=== 2009 election ===
Federal election (2009): Mosel/Rhein-Hunsrück
Notes:	Blue background denotes the winner of the electorate vote. Pink background denotes a candidate elected from their party list. Yellow background denotes an electorate win by a list member, or other incumbent. A ✓ or ✗ denotes status of any incumbent, win or lose respectively.						
Party	Candidate	Votes	%	±%	Party votes	%	±%
CDU	✓ Peter Bleser	60,105	47.7	▼2.4	50,302	39.4	▼3.0
SPD	Marcus Heintel	29,859	23.7	▼9.0	26,447	20.7	▼9.8
FDP	Ralf Heinrich Wilhelmi	15,714	12.5	▲4.9	24,248	19.0	▲5.3
Greens	Britta Steck	9,724	7.7	▲3.7	10,265	8.0	▲2.4
Left	Roger Mallmenn	9,035	7.2	▲2.8	10,568	8.3	▲3.4
Pirates					2,023	1.6	
FAMILIE					1,286	1.0	▲0.1
NPD	Erich Krames	1,521	1.2	0.0	1,137	0.9	▼0.1
REP					485	0.4	▼0.1
PBC					386	0.3	▼0.1
ÖDP					284	0.2	
DVU					100	0.1	
MLPD					25	0.0	0.0
Informal votes		4,233			2,635		
Total valid votes		125,958			127,556		
Turnout		130,191	72.6	▼7.0			
CDU hold	Majority	30,246	24.0	▲6.6			

=== 2005 election ===
Federal election (2005):Mosel/Rhein-Hunsrück
Notes:	Blue background denotes the winner of the electorate vote. Pink background denotes a candidate elected from their party list. Yellow background denotes an electorate win by a list member, or other incumbent. A ✓ or ✗ denotes status of any incumbent, win or lose respectively.						
Party	Candidate	Votes	%	±%	Party votes	%	±%
CDU	✓ Peter Bleser	69,904	50.1	▲1.3	59,542	42.4	▼4.1
SPD	Marcus Heintel	45,617	32.7	▼2.2	42,870	30.5	▼2.7
FDP	Jutta Wies	10,584	7.6	▼3.7	19,253	13.7	▲2.8
Left	Andreas Adams	6,133	4.4		6,821	4.9	▲4.0
Greens	Jutta Blatzheim-Roegler	5,633	4.0	▼0.9	7,954	5.7	▼0.5
NPD	Erich Krames	1,673	1.2		1,389	1.0	▲0.7
Familie					1,322	0.9	
REP					660	0.5	0.0
PBC					558	0.4	▲0.1
MLPD					66	0.0	
Informal votes		4,343			3,452		
Total valid votes		139,544			140,435		
Turnout		143,887	79.6	▼1.3			
CDU hold	Majority	24,287	17.4				
