= Abgatiacus =

In classical Celtic polytheism, Abgatiacus was a theonym referring to a Gallo-Roman deity. The theonym is known only from a single inscription found with a representation of the god discovered at Noviomagus Trevirorum, now Neumagen-Dhron in Germany. The god bearing the name was assimilated to Mercury and is depicted in the company of Rosmerta. He holds the caduceus in his hand and at his feet is a rooster. The inscription in which the theonym appears reads as follows:

IN HONOR(EM) D(OMVS) D(IVINAE) MERCVR(IO) ABGATIAC(O) ROSMERTAE AEDEM QVI FILIVS
