= Neumagen-Dhron =

Place in Rhineland-Palatinate, Germany

- Municipality
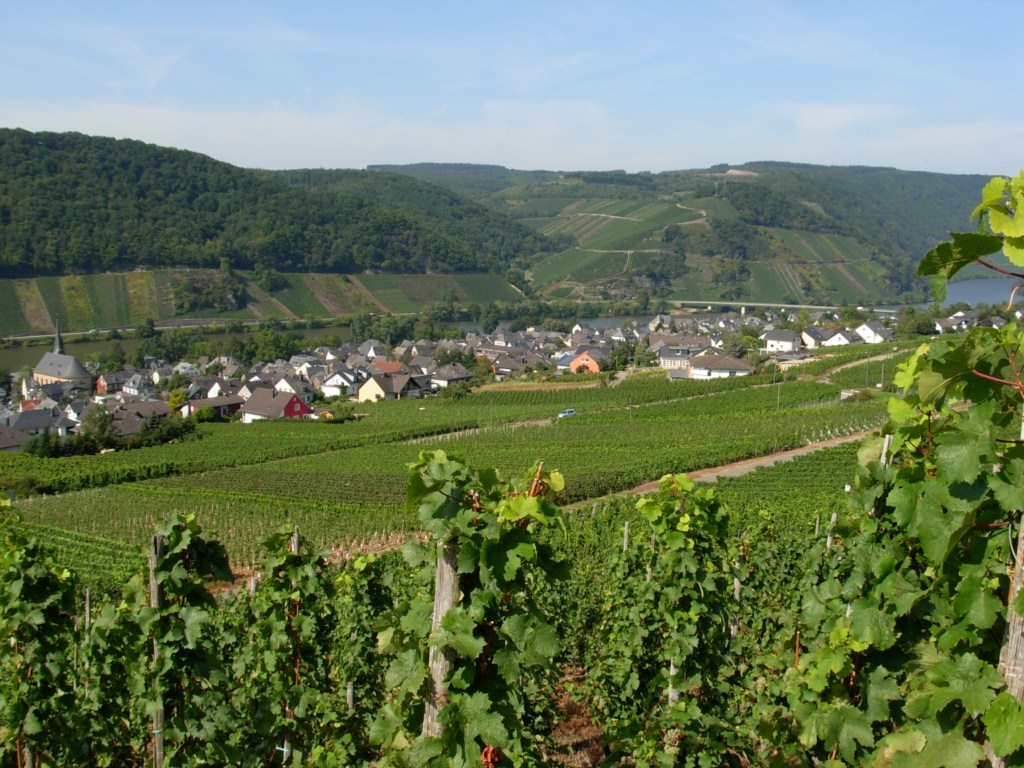

- Coat of arms

- Location of Neumagen-Dhron within Bernkastel-Wittlich district
- Interactive map of Neumagen-Dhron
- Location within Germany Location within Rhineland-Palatinate
- Coordinates: 49°51′34″N 6°53′51″E
- Country: Germany
- State: Rhineland-Palatinate
- District: Bernkastel-Wittlich
- Municipal assoc.: Bernkastel-Kues

Government
  - Mayor (2019–24): Dirk Doppelhamer (SPD)

Area
  - Total: 16.28 km^{2} (6.29 sq mi)
- Elevation: 130 m (430 ft)

Population (2025-12-31)
  - Total: 2,312
  - Density: 142.0/km^{2} (367.8/sq mi)
- Time zone: UTC+01:00 (CET)
  - Summer (DST): UTC+02:00 (CEST)
- Postal codes: 54347
- Dialling codes: 06507
- Vehicle registration: WIL and BKS
- Website: www.neumagen-dhron.de

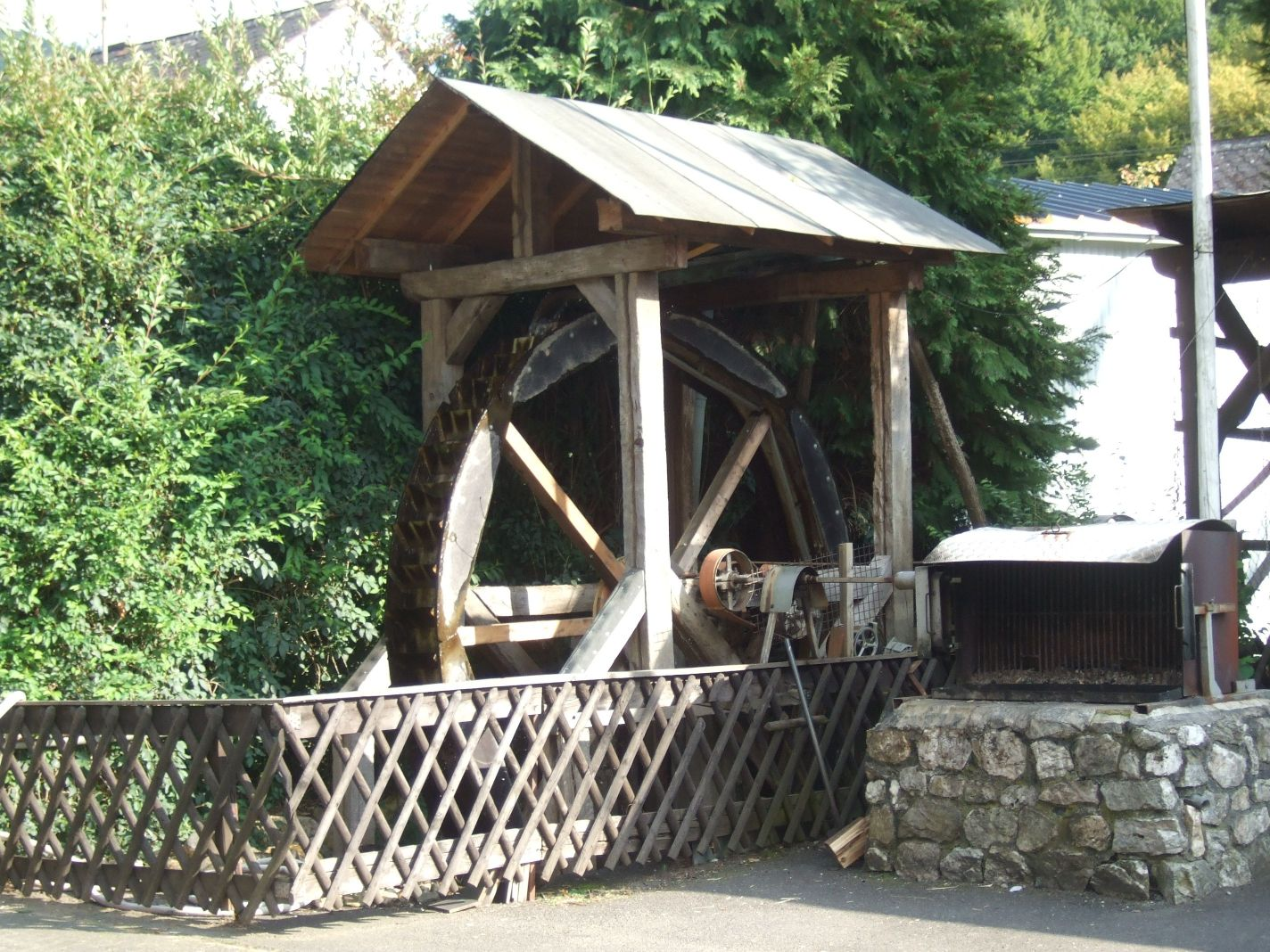
Papiermühle

Neumagen-Dhron (German pronunciation: [ˈnɔɪ̯ˌmaːɡn̩ ˈdʁoːn]) is an Ortsgemeinde – a municipality belonging to a Verbandsgemeinde, a kind of collective municipality – in the Bernkastel-Wittlich district in Rhineland-Palatinate, Germany. It is a state-recognized tourism community, and it was the seat of the former Verbandsgemeinde of Neumagen-Dhron. Its situation and amenities make it a lower-order centre.

== Geography ==
=== Location ===
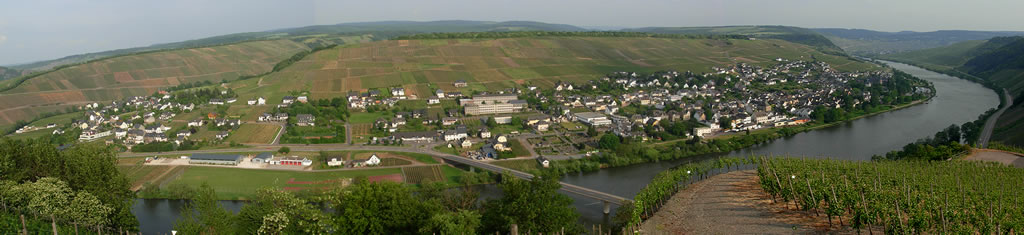
View of Neumagen-Dhron

Neumagen-Dhron lies roughly 15 km south of Wittlich and 20 km northwest of Trier. The municipality is made up of the three centres (Ortsteile) of Neumagen, Dhron, and Papiermühle ("Papermill"). The river Dhron is met by the Kleine Dhron ("Little Dhron") in the outlying centre of Papiermühle, whereafter it empties into the Moselle at Dhron. Over on the other side of the river from Neumagen, the river Zweibach also empties into the Moselle.

== History ==
Neumagen-Dhron is one of a series of places that claim the title "Germany's Oldest Winemaking Centre". The winemaking village of Neumagen was founded by the Romans some 2,000 years ago as a waystation on the road from Trier to Koblenz along the Moselle; its Latin name was Noviomagus Trevirorum ("Noviomagus of the Treviri"). It is the place where the Neumagen Wine Ship (Neumagener Weinschiff), a ship carved out of stone now in the Rhenish State Museum in Trier, was unearthed. A copy of the Wine Ship can be seen in the village centre. In the Early Middle Ages, Dhron is believed to have been the location of the episcopal Nicetiusburg (castle). The two places also later belonged to the Archbishopric of Trier. Beginning in 1794, Neumagen and Dhron lay under French rule. In 1815 they were assigned to the Kingdom of Prussia at the Congress of Vienna. Since 1946, they have been part of the then newly founded state of Rhineland-Palatinate.

Until municipal administrative reform in Rhineland-Palatinate in 1969, both centres belonged to the Bernkastel district, whose seat was in Bernkastel-Kues. Today's municipality was newly formed out of the older municipalities of Neumagen and Dhron on 7 June 1969.

== Politics ==
=== Municipal council ===
The council is made up of 16 council members, who were elected by proportional representation at the municipal election held on 7 June 2009, and the honorary mayor as chairman.

The municipal election held on 7 June 2009 yielded the following results:

	SPD	CDU	Kohl	FBL	Total
2009	3	5	3	5	16 seats
2004	3	5	3	5	16 seats
1999	3	4	3	6	16 seats

=== Mayor ===
The mayor is Dirk Doppelhamer (SPD).

=== Coat of arms ===
In 1951, arms were approved for both Neumagen and Dhron. Neumagen's arms might have been described thus: Per pale argent a cross gules and barry of thirteen of the first and azure, that is to say, with a red cross on a silver background on the dexter (armsbearer's right, viewer's left) side and thirteen horizontal stripes alternating between silver and blue on the sinister (armsbearer's left, viewer's right) side. Dhron's arms might have been described thus: Per pale argent a cross gules and gules a bend argent charged with three roses Or barbed vert, that is to say, with the same dexter side as Neumagen's arms, but with the sinister side showing a red field with a silver slanted stripe with three golden roses with green sepals running along it.

In 1967, the arms were changed in connection with the merger of the two municipalities. The resulting escutcheon might be described thus: Barry of eleven argent and azure the Neumagen Wine Ship Or, in a chief of the first a cross gules charged with three roses in fess of the third.

The red cross stands for Neumagen's and Dhron's longtime allegiance to the Electorate of Trier, while the three golden roses stand for Tholey Abbey, a Benedictine monastery that once owned a winegrowing estate in Dhron. The blue and silver stripes stand for the old feudal lords of Neumagen, and the Wine Ship for the municipality's Roman beginnings.

== Culture and sightseeing ==
=== Sightseeing ===
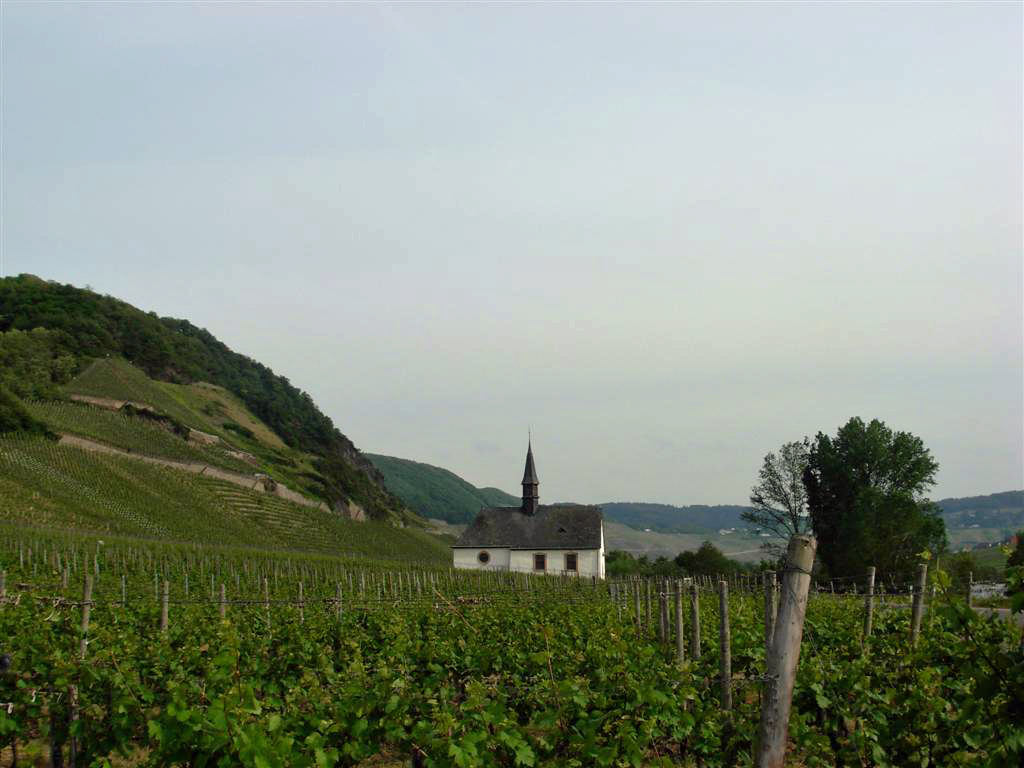
Märtyrerkapelle

One point of interest is the Archaeological Loop, on which guided tours are also regularly offered. In the centre of Neumagen is found a cast of the Roman Wine Ship right next to the old Saint Peter's Chapel (Peterskapelle) and the Ausonius Garden. Something about the municipality's earlier history can also be learnt at the local history museum.

Likewise worth seeing are the old Gothic church in Dhron and the nearby cathedral "free estate".

Farther up the Moselle is found the new cycle path which leads straight to the Rosengärtchen vineyard with its archway of roses and its Märtyrerkapelle ("Martyrs' Chapel").

A working replica of the Neumagen Wine Ship can be chartered.

=== Regular events ===
- Weinstraßenfest (street wine festival ) in Neumagen (September)
- Weinstraßenfest Metschert in Dhron (August)
- Traditional Easter egg shoot by the shooting club (April)
- Königs und Prinzenschießen ("King's and Prince's Shoot", April)
- Fire brigade's Father's Day festival (May)
- Fire brigade's summer festival (August)
- Angling club's fish baking festival (May)
- Christmas concert by the Winzerkapelle ("winemakers' orchestra") in Dhron (December)

=== Vineyards ===
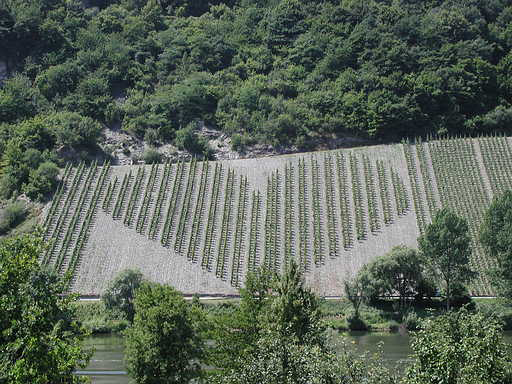
Heart-shaped vineyard (opposite Neumagen-Dhron)

Neumagen-Dhron is to a considerable extent characterized by winegrowing, and with 247 ha of planted vineyard area is the biggest winegrowing centre on the Moselle after Piesport, Zell, Leiwen, and Konz. Traditionally, the winegrowers' mainstay has been Riesling. Moreover, winegrowing forms the basis for tourism, which is likewise an important part of the economy.

Well known Dhron vineyards are:

- Dhroner Hofberger
- Dhroner Roterd
- Piesporter Grafenberg (overlaps with neighbouring municipality of Piesport)
- Piesporter Goldtröpfchen (overlaps with neighbouring municipality of Piesport)

Well known Neumagen vineyards are:

- Dhroner Hofberger (overlaps with Dhron)
- Neumagener Engelgrube
- Neumagener Laudamusberg
- Neumagener Rosengärtchen

=== Archaeological finds in Neumagen-Dhron ===
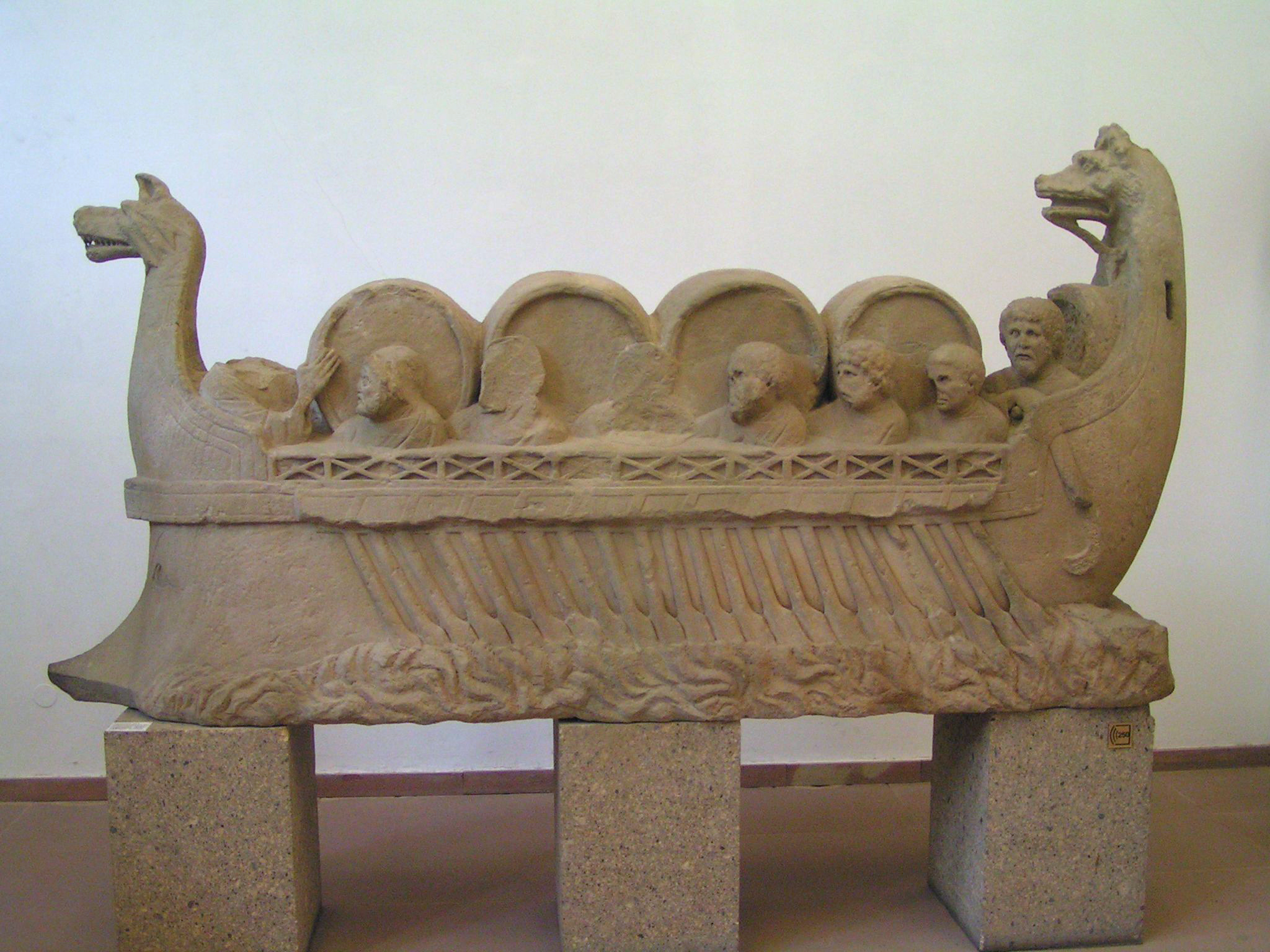
The original Neumagen Wine Ship

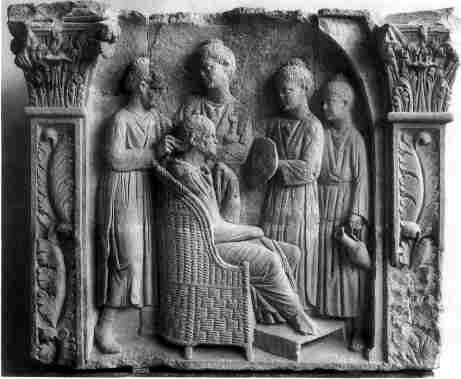
Hairdressing scene/Lady of the house at her morning toilet

At digs and new building works in Neumagen-Dhron, many old monuments have been found in the old castrum's foundations that were used for fortification. Some of the more important finds are listed here:

- Neumagen Wine Ship
- Roman steersman
- Grapevine relief
- Wine transport
- Roman wine ship with merry steersman
- Great mealtime gable
- Amphora pyramid
- Cupbearer
- Banquet and drinking scene
- Banquet scene
- Rent payment
- Mars figure (bronze)
- Albinus Asper's and his wife Secundia Restituta's grave marker
- "Parental" columns
- School relief
- "Negotiator" column
- Hairdressing scene

== Economy and infrastructure ==
=== Public institutions ===
- St. Helena Grundschule (primary school)
- Ausonius Hauptschule
- Friedrich Spee Realschule
- Neumagen-Dhron Verbandsgemeinde administration
- Tourist information
- Fire station

Since the 2009/2010 school year, the Ausonius Hauptschule and the Friedrich Spee Realschule together form a unified "Realschule Plus".

=== Transport ===
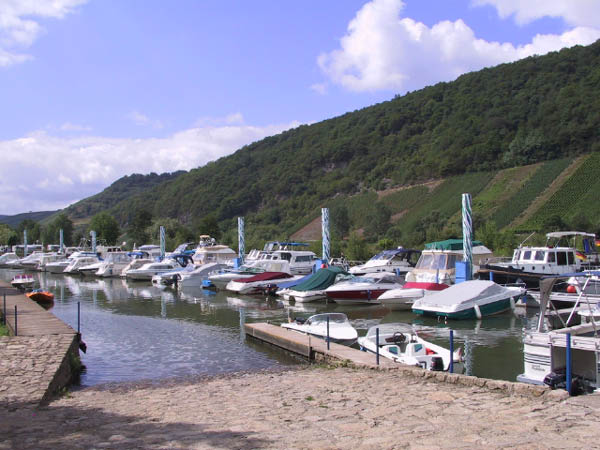
The harbour in Neumagen-Dhron

==== Road ====
Neumagen-Dhron lies right on Bundesstraße 53, although this does not run through the built-up area, which consequently has little road traffic. Right at Neumagen-Dhron is a bridge on this road, which affords a good and quick link to other nearby places. The Autobahn A 1 can be reached in 15 minutes, and along it, drivers can reach nearby cities such as Trier or Koblenz.

==== River ====
Neumagen-Dhron has at its disposal its own yacht harbour, and by way of a landing stage, passenger voyages, for instance to Bernkastel-Kues, are possible.

==== Cycling paths ====
Coming from Trittenheim and Trier, the new cycling path runs right alongside the Moselle. Furthermore, cyclists can ride on paths on either side of the Moselle towards Piesport or Bernkastel-Kues.

==== Air ====
On the Neumagen-Dhron Plateau, some 2 km southeast of the municipality, is the Flugplatz Neumagen-Dhron, an airfield run by the aerial sport club.
