= Irmenach =

- Municipality
- Coat of arms

- Location of Irmenach within Bernkastel-Wittlich district
- Interactive map of Irmenach
- Location within Germany Location within Rhineland-Palatinate
- Coordinates: 49°55′27″N 7°11′14″E
- Country: Germany
- State: Rhineland-Palatinate
- District: Bernkastel-Wittlich
- Municipal assoc.: Traben-Trarbach

Government
  - Mayor (2019–24): Martin Kirst (SPD)

Area
  - Total: 16.38 km^{2} (6.32 sq mi)
- Elevation: 445 m (1,460 ft)

Population (2025-12-31)
  - Total: 627
  - Density: 38.3/km^{2} (99.1/sq mi)
- Time zone: UTC+01:00 (CET)
  - Summer (DST): UTC+02:00 (CEST)
- Postal codes: 56843
- Dialling codes: 06541
- Vehicle registration: WIL

Irmenach is an Ortsgemeinde – a municipality belonging to a Verbandsgemeinde, a kind of collective municipality – in the Bernkastel-Wittlich district in Rhineland-Palatinate, Germany.

== Geography ==
=== Location ===
The municipality lies in the Hunsrück east of Bernkastel-Kues at an elevation of 445 m above sea level. It belongs to the Verbandsgemeinde of Traben-Trarbach, whose seat is in the like-named town.

=== Constituent communities ===
Irmenach's Ortsteile are Irmenach and Beuren, which lie only about a kilometre from each other.

== History ==
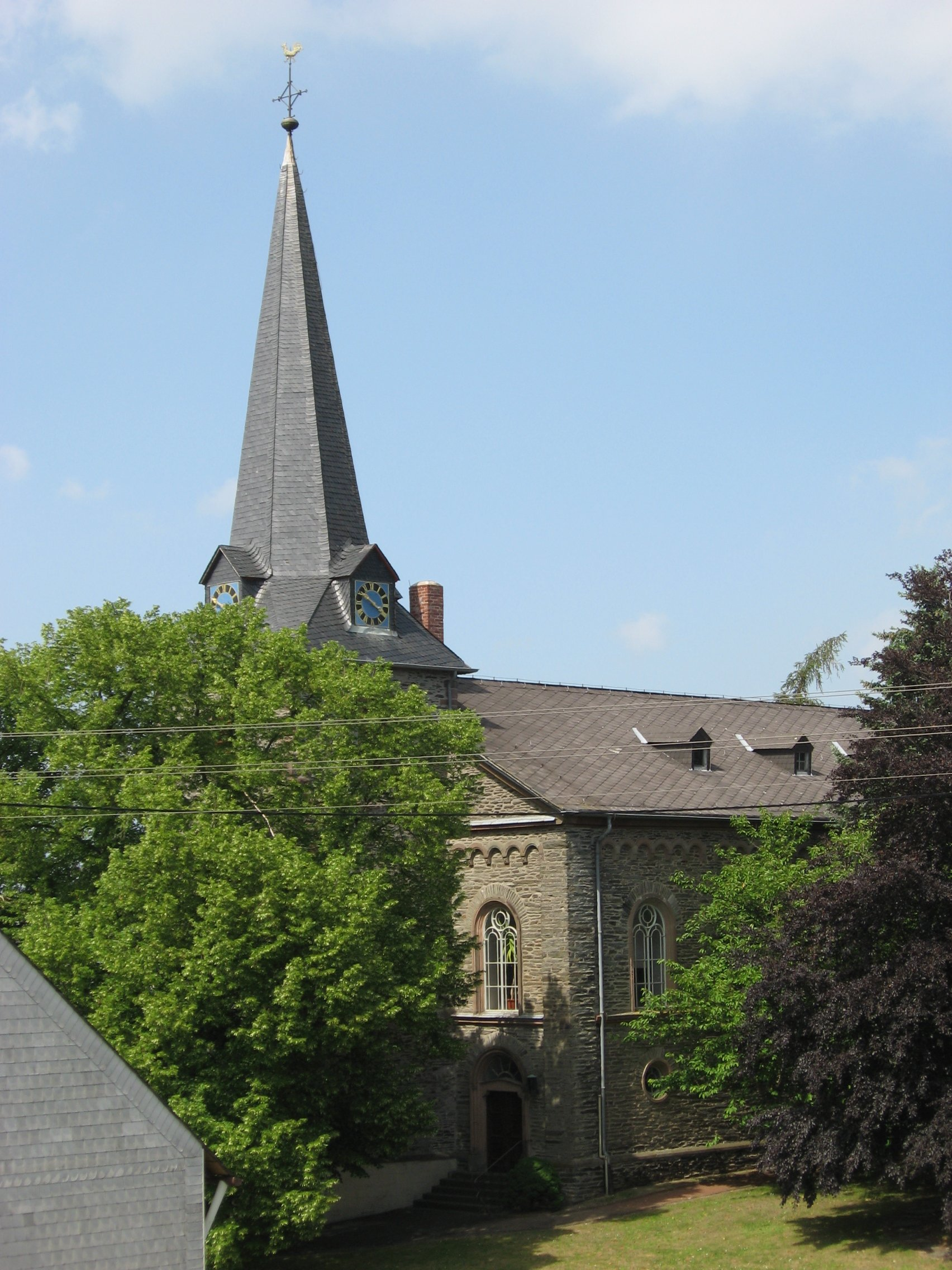
Evangelical church in Irmenach

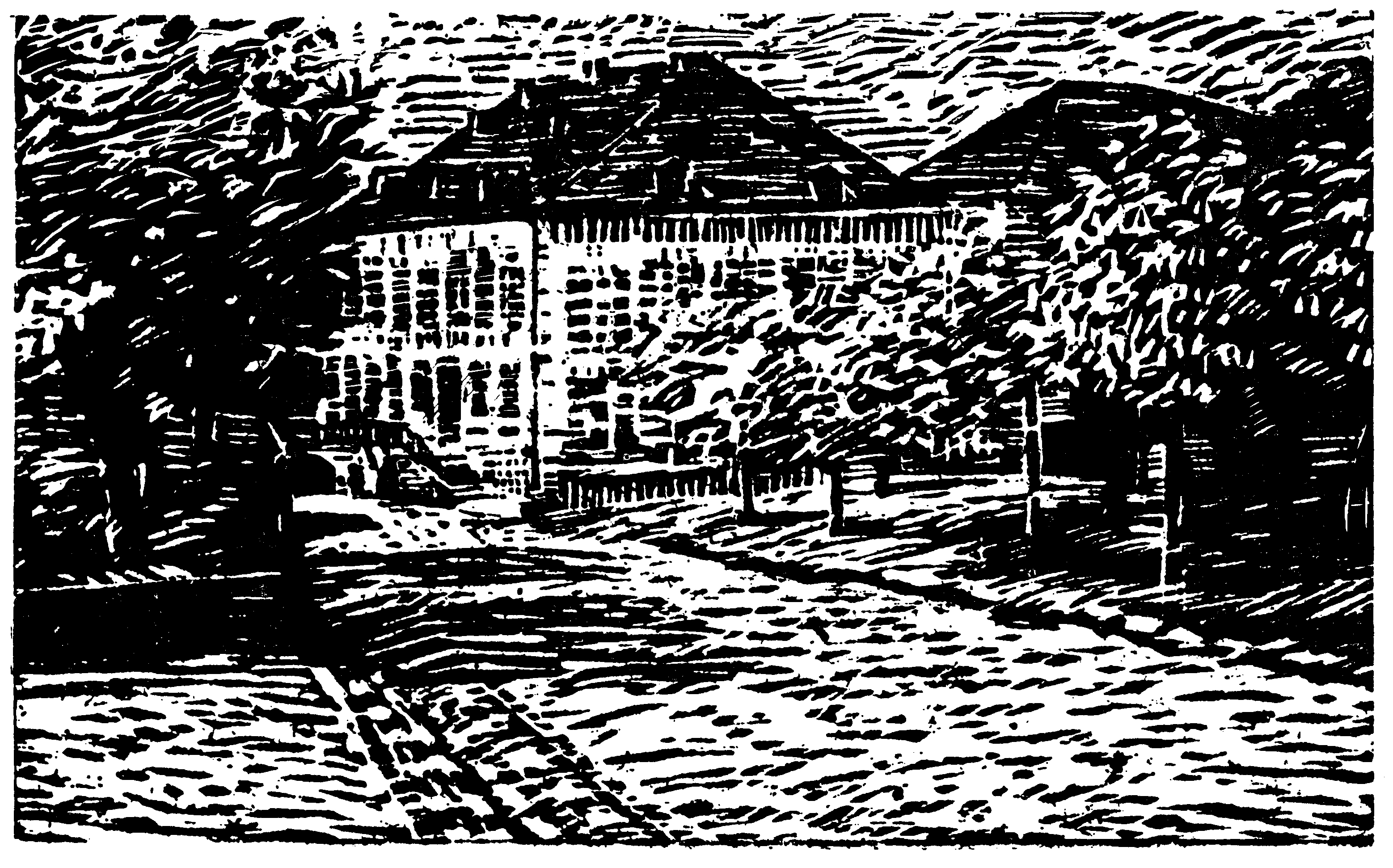
Marketplace with Fuchss Inn (woodcarving by Friedrich Karl Ströher)

Irmenach's and Beuren's beginnings are shrouded in darkness. There are known to have been settlers in the area as early as Roman times. An old local tradition has it that the name Irmenach goes back to Saint Irmina, which is, however, hardly likely. A far greater likelihood is that it came from Herminiachus (“Herminius’s Estate”), in which Herminius was a Celtic nobleman who had Latinized his name. Originally, Irmenach formed, together with Beuren and Thalkleinich, now an outlying centre of Kleinich, the greater municipality of Irmenach, which existed until 1828.

No later than the 14th century, and quite likely earlier, there were a church in Irmenach and a chapel in Beuren, to whose upkeep the inhabitants of Thalkleinich also had to contribute, even if their ecclesiastical needs were being satisfied by the one in Kleinich, which was only a few hundred metres away. A priest is witnessed for Irmenach no later than 1351, as was a pastor in 1413.

The Irmenach church might originally have been Saint Peter's Church, even though the old local lore held that it was consecrated to Saint “Irmel” (Irmina) or that at the very least there was an altar consecrated to Irmina. Whatever the truth is, it seems that there were pilgrimages to the Irmenach church. Of the older church buildings, the lowest part of the tower may be all that is left; this may date from about 1200, whereas the tower and the nave were built later. Preserved to this day, however, are the old bells (sample peal) from 1423, 1514 (poured by Hans von Breisig) and 1555 (poured by Johann von Trier). In 1871 and 1872, a new nave was built in Irmenach, as the one that had stood until then had become too small for the community. This was not accomplished before an acrimonious dispute between the two centres, for the Beuren dwellers were of the opinion that any new church building should happen in their village. When the old church was torn down, the paintings, of which there is no doubt there were many, were all lost; such artworks can still be found at Lötzbeuren and Raversbeuren. The historical Stumm organ from 1776, though, was preserved.

The Beuren chapel was consecrated to Saint Anthony, thus meaning that it would go back to the 12th century at the earliest. In the chapel in pre-Reformation times was a picture of the saint, which is likewise witnessed as the object of pilgrimages. Of the chapel, only the tower still stands today, for the nave was torn down about 1950, supposedly because it was falling into disrepair.

Irmenach belonged to the “Hinder” County of Sponheim and thus shared its history. In particular, its proximity to the Grevenburg (castle) often led to occupation by enemy armies, under which the villagers suffered greatly. In 1557, the Reformation was introduced into Irmenach, as it was throughout the County. Ever since, Irmenach has been an Evangelical (Lutheran) community. Nevertheless, there might have been a few families who were under Electoral-Trier serfdom and who therefore remained Catholic, even if – unlike what happened in other municipalities – a simultaneum was never instituted at the church. Only in recent times has the Catholic share of the population grown somewhat with newcomers.

With the partition of the “Hinder” County of Sponheim in 1776, Irmenach ended up, as did the whole Oberamt of Trarbach, with the House of Palatinate-Birkenfeld, until eventually the County ceased to exist with the French conquest in 1794. Beginning in 1815, Irmenach belonged to Prussia and was grouped into the Mayoralty of Büchenbeuren in the newly formed district of Zell. After that district's dissolution in 1969, Irmenach belonged for a short time to the Rhein-Hunsrück-Kreis. When the Verbandsgemeinde of Büchenbeuren was also dissolved in 1970, with a foreseen merger of the whole entity into the Verbandsgemeinde of Kirchberg, the two municipalities of Irmenach and Beuren managed to have themselves, with effect from 7 November 1970, transferred to the newly formed Verbandsgemeinde of Traben-Trarbach in the Bernkastel-Wittlich district. By decree of the Regierungsbezirk government in Trier, from 30 October 1974, the two until then self-administering municipalities of Irmenach and Beuren were dissolved and merged into a single one. The double name “Irmenach-Beuren”, however – used by almost all the municipality's clubs – was not adopted as the new municipality's name as well.

== Church ==
Since 1979, the parishes of Irmenach, Lötzbeuren and Raversbeuren have shared the same pastor. In 2012 the three parishes joined to form the new parish “Irmenach-Lötzbeuren-Raversbeuren”. The pastoral seat is in Lötzbeuren. The parish belongs to the church district of Simmern-Trarbach.

== Politics ==
The municipal council is made up of 12 council members, who were elected by proportional representation at the municipal election held on 7 June 2009, and the honorary mayor as chairman.

The municipal election held on 7 June 2009 yielded the following results:

	SPD	CDU	Total
2009	8	4	12 seats
2004	7	5	12 seats

=== Coat of arms ===
The municipality's arms might be described thus: Gules a plough argent between three crosses pattée Or, one and two.

== Culture and sightseeing ==
=== Buildings ===
- Evangelical church in Irmenach with Stumm organ
- Tower of the Evangelical chapel in Beuren
- Roman villa and grave

=== Clubs ===
In Irmenach, a lively club life prevails. Besides the volunteer fire brigade and many local clubs, there is the Turn- und Sportverein Irmenach-Beuren e.V. (a gymnastic and sport club founded in 1913), which together with the TuS Kleinich and TuS Horbruch forms the successful handball team Irmenach-Kleinich-Horbuch, which played for a number of years in the Regional Handball League (Handball-Regionalliga).

== Economy and infrastructure ==
Over the ages, agriculture was the main income earner. Irmenach and Beuren were long said to be the Hunsrück's richest farming villages. Although there were still many small agricultural operations run as sidelines even into the 1980s, the number of operations today has – following the general trend – shrunk to only a handful.

Besides farming, slate was mined for a long time. In the Irmenach area are many slate mines, some of which already existed in the 17th century. As Johann Hofmann wrote in 1669: “Foremost, there are in the same mountain ranges a great many slate quarries / wherefrom the countryside’s inhabitants have as great an income / as perhaps others might not obtain from their fruitful fields”. According to local lore, Irmenach slate was used in the building of, among others, the Reichstag in Berlin and Brussels Cathedral. In the late 1960s, the last slate quarry was closed as recovery had become unprofitable.

The biggest employer since the War ended has been the Hans Kirst firm, located in Irmenach, which today makes horse box stalls.

One important economic factor, however, has always been Frankfurt-Hahn Airport.

== Famous people ==
=== Sons and daughters of the town ===
- Friedrich Karl Ströher, painter, graphic artist and sculptor, important Hunsrück artist
- Karl Georg Marhoffer, clergyman and Consistorial president of the Protestant Reformed Church of Luxembourg

=== Famous people associated with the municipality ===
- Heinrich Rodewald, Lic. theol., clergyman, provincial church archivist, compiler of many writings on the history of Irmenach and the Hinder County of Sponheim
- Clärenore Stinnes, the first person to circumnavigate the world by car
- Jakob Kneip, poet, wrote his novel Hampit der Jäger in Irmenach
