= Marlon Bröhr =

German politician

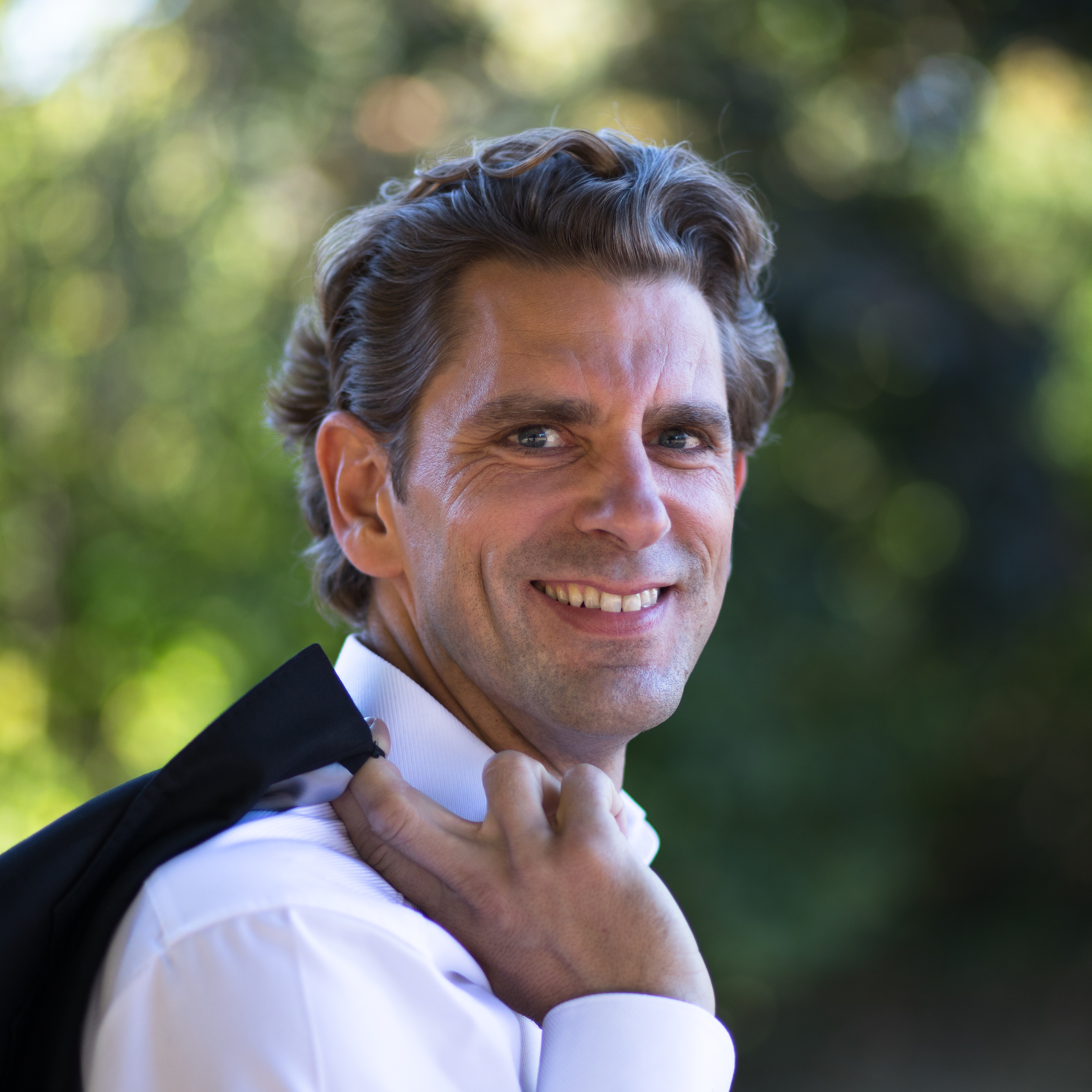

Member of the Bundestag
- Incumbent
- Assumed office 2021

Personal details
- Born: 3 April 1974 (age 52) Geilenkirchen
- Party: CDU

Marlon Andreas Paul Bröhr (born 3 April 1974 in Geilenkirchen) is a German dentist and politician of the Christian Democratic Union (CDU). He was District Administrator of the Rhine-Hunsrück district from May 2015 to September 2021. He is a directly elected member of the 20th German Bundestag.

== Life ==
Bröhr graduated from the Bischöfliches Mariengymnasium in Mönchengladbach in 1993. Before that, he had spent a year in the USA at Groton High School in South Dakota. He studied dentistry at RWTH Aachen University until 1998, earning his doctorate there in 2002. In the meantime, he worked as an assistant dentist at a dental practice in Aachen. In 2003, Bröhr moved with his family to Kastellaun, where he ran his own dental practice until 2006. He is married and has two children.

== Politics ==
Marlon Bröhr joined the CDU in 1999. He was elected as an independent candidate for mayor of the Kastellaun municipality in 2007 and for mayor of Kastellaun in 2009. He held both offices until 2014. In December 2013, Bröhr announced his intention to run for the CDU in the next district council election in the Rhine-Hunsrück district. In the district council election on 28 September 2014, he was elected as the new district administrator of the Rhine-Hunsrück district with 68.7% of the valid votes. On 3 May 2015, he succeeded Bertram Fleck (CDU).

== Party politics ==
Bröhr first caused a stir within the party in November 2016, when he criticized the previous allocation of executive board positions at the state party conference of the CDU Rhineland-Palatinate.

In October 2019, Marlon Bröhr issued an invitation to a press conference via his Landrat account and announced his intention to run as a CDU top candidate in the upcoming state election campaign. The state executive committee of the CDU Rhineland-Palatinate had previously nominated in June 2019 the parliamentary group leader Christian Baldauf as top candidate for 2021. At the state party conference on 16 November 2019, Bröhr competed against Baldauf in a combat vote. He received about 20% of the delegates' votes and thus lost the election.

When the long-time delegate Peter Bleser no longer ran for the constituency 200 in the Bundestag election in September 2021, Bröhr expressed his interest in the mandate. On 9 January 2021, during a delegates' meeting in Sohren, he was nominated as a direct candidate of the CDU for the election to the German Bundestag receiving 95% of the votes. In the Bundestag election on 26 September 2021, Bröhr won his constituency directly with 34.3% of the votes.

== Local and state politics ==
In July 2017, in the dispute over the planned construction of the Middle Rhine Bridge, the district council factions of SPD, FDP and the Freie Wähler filed a lawsuit against District Administrator Bröhr. Bröhr had previously refused to put the joint motion of the complaining factions to start the regional planning procedure in the district to the agenda. Bröhr justified his decision with the fact that it was a construction project of the state of Rhineland-Palatinate. On 1 February 2018, the Koblenz Administrative Court ruled that the construction of the Middle Rhine Bridge had to be put on the agenda of the next county council meeting. The judges justified the ruling saying that the bridge affected the Rhine-Hunsrück district. Bröhr announced that he would appeal against the ruling.

In September 2018, in a dispute over church asylum, Bröhr filed criminal charges against several pastors who had granted refugees refuge. In the course of the investigation against the clergymen, the offices of five pastors were searched at the end of January 2019, files were seized and computer files were copied for evaluation. Bröhr had refused mediation. In April 2019, the Regional Court of Bad Kreuznach found that the house searches of pastors in the Hunsrück had been illegal.

In December 2018, Bröhr filed criminal charges against several elementary school teachers for linking a deportation carried out by the district administration to the Reichspogromnacht. In a protest letter, the teachers wrote that on 9 November 2018, an Armenian family of five had been "deported." The circumstances of the deportation on 9 November 2018, had also been criticized by refugee aid organizations. The case against the teachers was dropped, saying that there was no insult, and that their letter was covered by freedom of speech.

In April 2021, Marlon Bröhr, as a private citizen, filed an emergency application with the Koblenz Administrative Court against the Corona measures in the Rhine-Hunsrück district to determine the legality of the free movement restrictions. As district administrator, on the instructions of the state of Rhineland-Palatinate he had to order these measures himself on 7 April 2021. The emergency application was rejected by the Koblenz Administrative Court.
