= Carina Konrad =

German politician

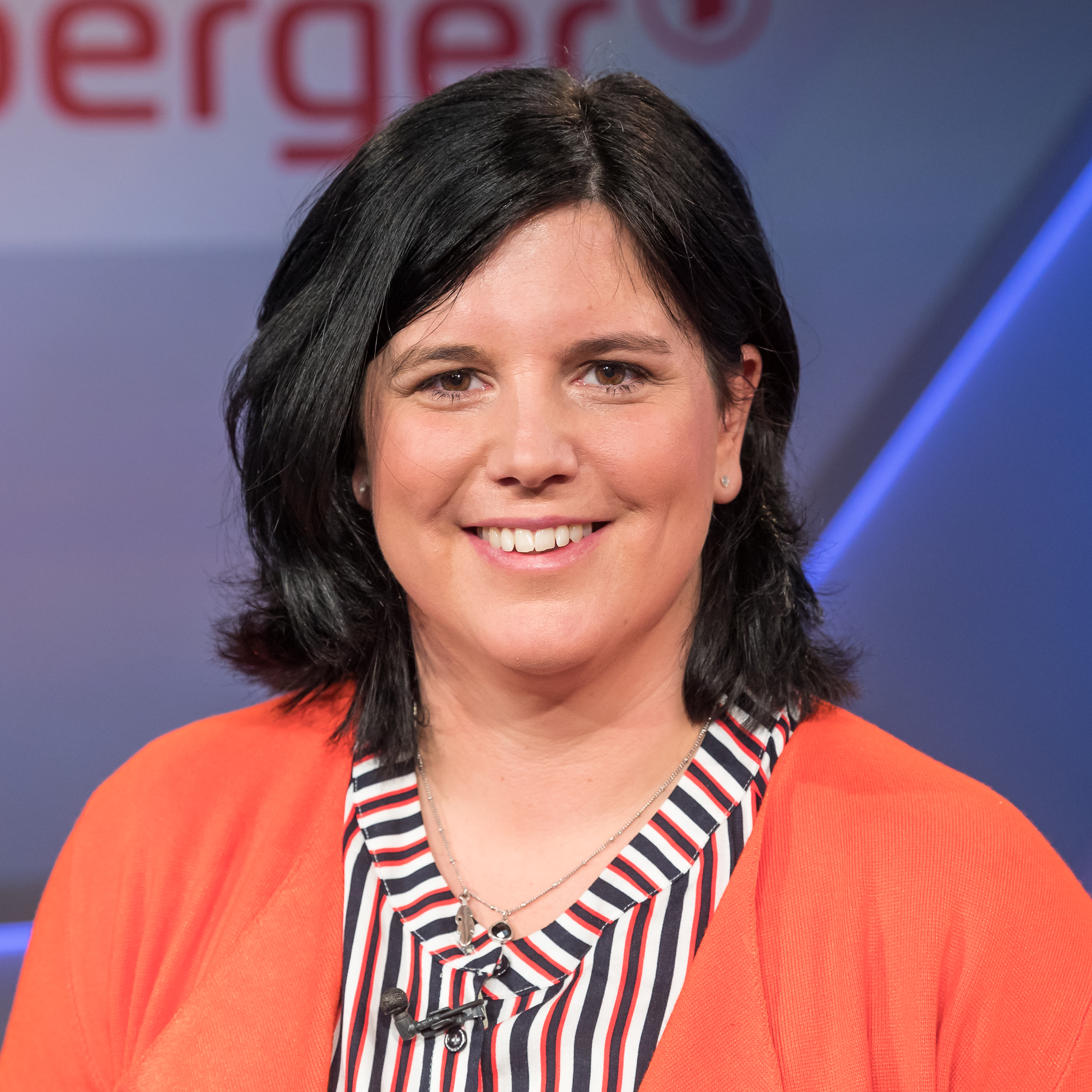
- Carina Konrad in 2019

Member of the Bundestag
- In office 2017–2025

Personal details
- Born: 19 September 1982 (age 43) Simmern, West Germany (now Germany)
- Party: FDP
- Children: 3

Carina Konrad (born 19 September 1982) is a German politician of the Free Democratic Party (FDP) who served as a member of the Bundestag from the state of Rhineland-Palatinate from 2017 to 2025.

== Early life and career ==
Konrad completed her studies with a degree in agricultural engineering (FH). She runs a farm with arable farming and cattle breeding with her family in Bickenbach in the Hunsrück.

From the 2016 state elections until she moved to the Bundestag, she worked as chief of staff to Marco Weber in the State Parliament of Rhineland-Palatinate.

== Political career ==
Konrad became a member of the Bundestag in the 2017 elections, representing the Mosel/Rhein-Hunsrück district. In parliament, she served as deputy chair of the Committee on Food and Agriculture. She is also a deputy member of the Committee for Family Affairs, Senior Citizens, Women and Youth. She was her parliamentary group's spokesperson for viticulture policy in the Bundestag.

In the negotiations to form a so-called traffic light coalition of the Social Democrats (SPD), the Green Party and the FDP following the 2021 federal elections, Konrad led her party's delegation in the working group on agriculture and nutrition; her co-chairs from the other parties were Till Backhaus and Renate Künast.

From 2021 to 2025, Konrad served as one of six deputy chairpersons of the FDP parliamentary group under the leadership of its chairman Christian Dürr, where she oversaw the group's activities on sustainability and infrastructure.

== Political positions ==
In her position as deputy chair in 2022, Konrad opposed a value-added tax increase aimed at increasing farm animal welfare. The proposed increase, brought forward by a government expert commission, would be used to fund the refurbishment of farm stables.

== Other activities ==
- Federal Network Agency for Electricity, Gas, Telecommunications, Post and Railway (BNetzA), Member of the Advisory Board (since 2022)
