= Neumagen-Dhron (Verbandsgemeinde) =

Collective municipality in Rhineland-Palatinate, Germany

Coordinates: 49.853°N 6.894°E

Neumagen-Dhron is a former Verbandsgemeinde ("collective municipality") in the district Bernkastel-Wittlich, in Rhineland-Palatinate, Germany. Its seat of administration was in Neumagen-Dhron. It was disbanded on 1 January 2012.

The Verbandsgemeinde Neumagen-Dhron consisted of the following Ortsgemeinden ("local municipalities"):

1. Minheim
2. Neumagen-Dhron
3. Piesport
4. Trittenheim
