= Piesporter =

German white wine

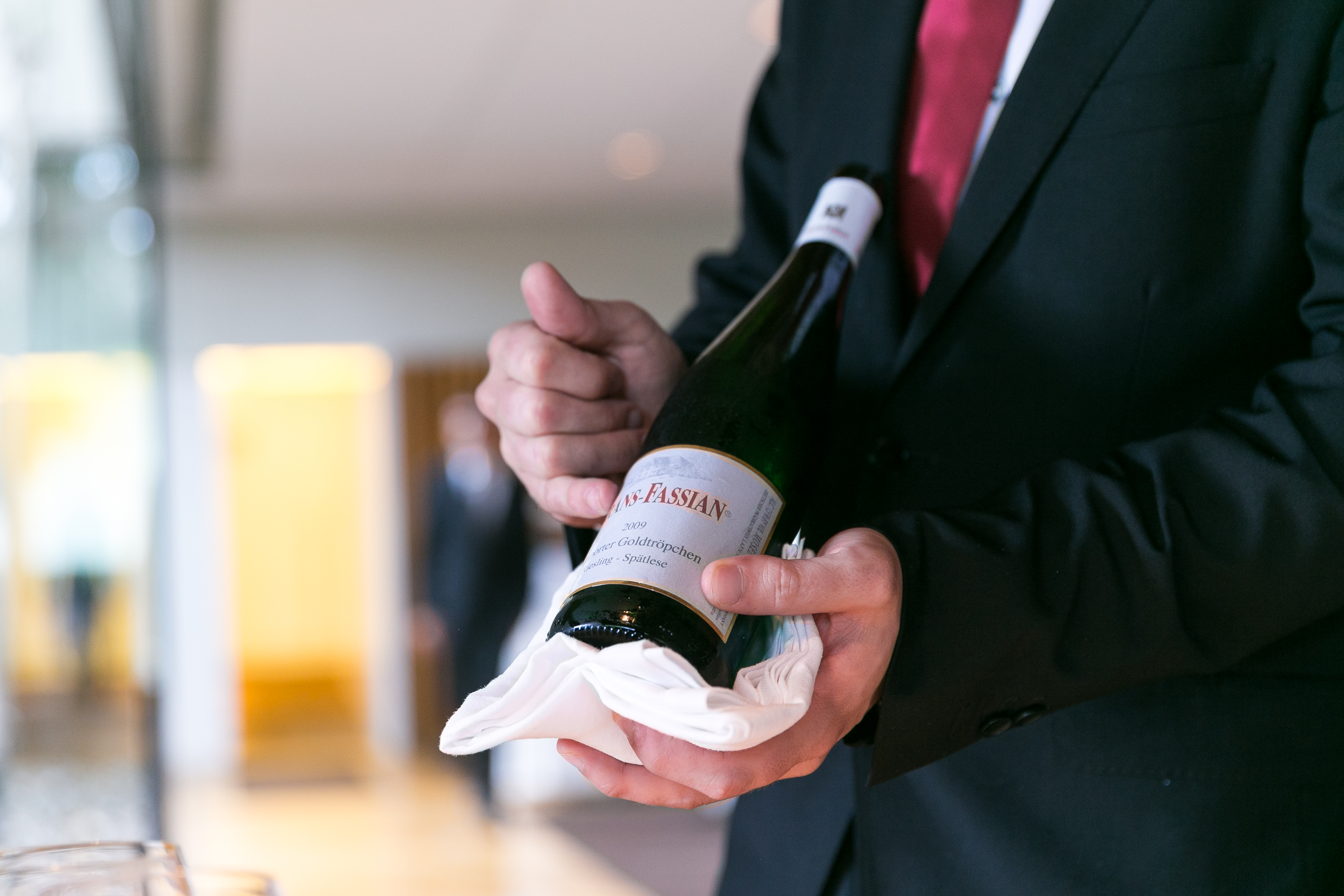
A Bottle of 2009 Grans-Fassian Piesporter Goldtropfchen Spatlese

Piesporter is a wine made in and around the village of Piesport on the north bank of the Mosel wine region of Germany. A white, light body wine that ranges from dry to off-dry, it can be made from Riesling, Müller-Thurgau, or Elbling grapes.

The wine often has a Qualitätswein bestimmter Anbaugebiete (QbA) classification, meaning that it was produced in accordance with regional appellation laws and has been tested for compliance by an official committee. In some cases a Piesporter may be chaptalized with sugar added to the juice before fermentation to increase the alcohol level. Chaptalization is more common in the “cheap” export Piesporters that are made from the Müller-Thurgau and Elbling varieties. The cheaper wines are often labelled as "Piesporter Michelsberg"—which means that the grapes are from somewhere in the area, as opposed to the first-class vineyards in Piesport itself ("Piesporter Goldtröpfchen" being the most famous one).

Despite the poor reputation that Piesporters get from the inferior varieties that often flood the market, Piesporter wine and the village from which they originate have a long and unique history in producing outstanding German wine.

== History ==
In 371 AD, the Roman poet Ausonius described the steep hills surrounding the river bend at Piesport as a natural amphitheatre covered with vines. Archaeological excavations have found several Diatretgläser (ornate glass Roman drinking vessels that served as status symbols of wealth and importance in Roman times.)

At the foot of the Goldtröpfchen vineyard in Piesport, a 4th-century AD Roman press house was discovered in 1985. With 7 basins, it could handle grapes from 60 hectares (148 acres)—making it the largest found north of the Alps.

In 1763, Lutheran pastor Johannes Hau convinced the local growers to plant Riesling grape exclusively and donated vines from his own vineyard. Today Riesling is still the dominant grape of the Piesport region.

The slate-blue Devonian slate soil is soft, light, and stony, ensuring good water supply, and is especially apt at absorbing the sunshine reflected by the Mosel River upon the steep south-facing slopes. This helps to produce an optimal climate for Riesling grapes, giving “true” Piesporter wine a great finesse, a plethora of aromas, and a crisp and exotic finish.

== See also ==
- Devonian
