= Peter Bleser =

German politician (born 1952)

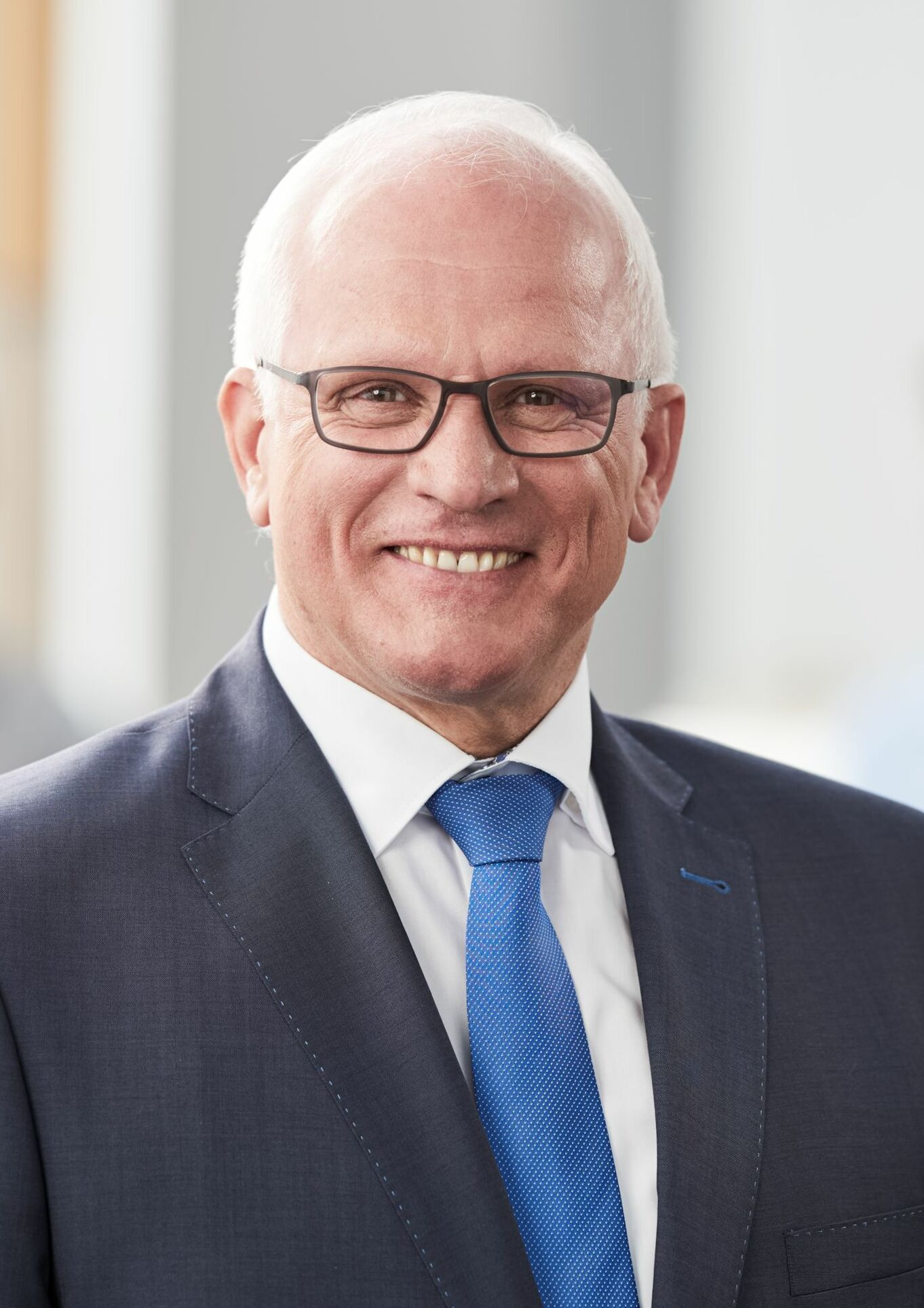

Member of the Bundestag
- In office 20 December 1990 – 2021

Personal details
- Born: 23 July 1952 (age 73) Brachtendorf, Rhineland-Palatinate West Germany
- Party: Christian Democratic Union

Peter Bleser (born 23 July 1952) is a German politician of the Christian Democratic Union (CDU) who served as a member of the Bundestag from 1990 until 2021, representing Mosel/Rhein-Hunsrück.

== Political career ==
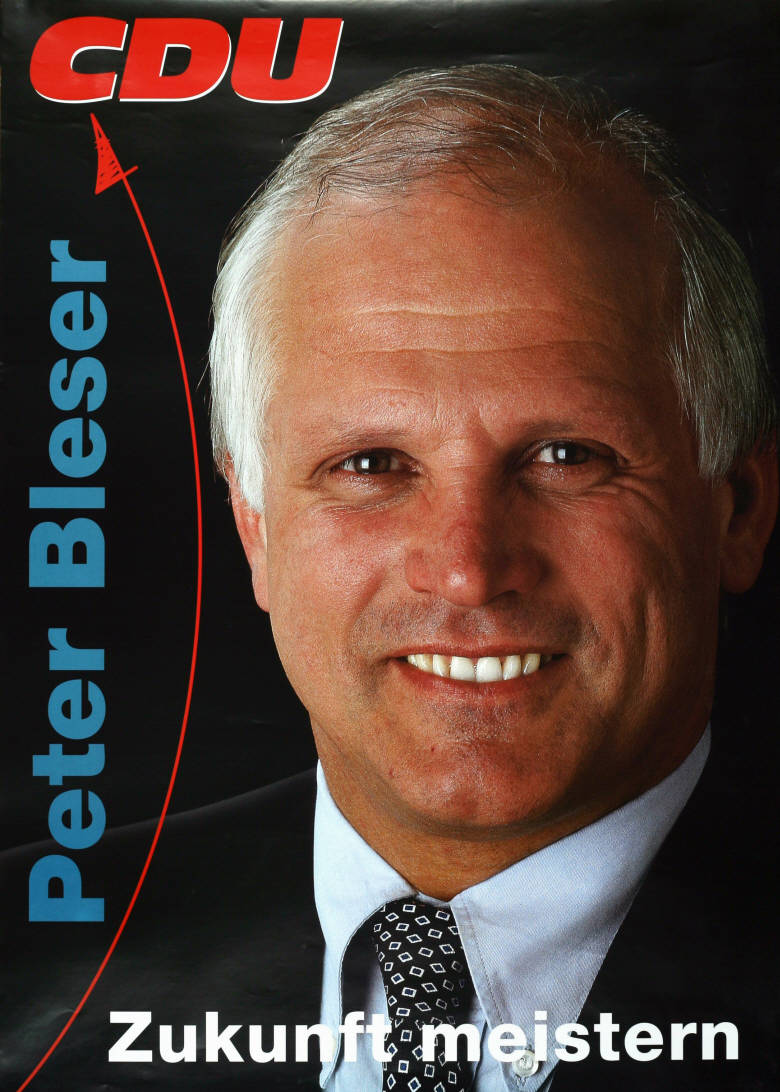
Bleser on a 1998 election poster

From 1990 until 2011, Bleser served on the Committee on Food and Agriculture. He was also a member of the Committee on European Affairs between 1990 and 1998.

In addition to his committee assignments, Bleser was a member of the German-French Parliamentary Friendship Group, the German-Russian Parliamentary Friendship Group and the German-Brazilian Parliamentary Friendship Group between 1990 and 2002.

In 2011, Bleser succeeded Julia Klöckner as Parliamentary State secretary at the Federal Ministry of Food, Agriculture and Consumer Protection under minister Ilse Aigner (2008–2013) in the second cabinet of Chancellor Angela Merkel. He later also served under minister Christian Schmidt from 2013. In this capacity, he oversaw the ministry's activities on nutrition, consumer protection, agriculture, animal welfare and EU policies.

Following the 2013 elections, Bleser was elected chairman of the Bundestag group of CDU parliamentarians from Rhineland-Palatinate.

Shortly after his re-election in 2017, Bleser had his parliamentary immunity lifted when prosecutors launched an investigation against him for suspected breach of trust and party financing laws. According to investigators, Bleser was alleged to have accepted some €56,000 ($66,000) in illegal donations from Werner Mauss between 2004 and 2015, first as the chairman of the CDU's district association in Cochem-Zell and then as the party's treasurer in Rhineland-Palatinate.

In the negotiations to form a coalition government following the 2017 federal elections, Bleser was part of the working group on agriculture, led by Julia Klöckner, Christian Schmidt and Anke Rehlinger. He was replaced at the Federal Ministry of Food, Agriculture and Consumer Protection by Hans-Joachim Fuchtel. After leaving his government post in 2018, he served on the Committee on Economic Affairs and Energy. In this capacity, he was his parliamentary group's rapporteur on foreign trade; the circular economy; renewable energy; and government procurement. In addition to his committee assignments, he served as deputy chairman of the German-Ukrainian Parliamentary Friendship Group from 2018 until 2021.

In late 2019, Bleser announced that he would not stand in the 2021 federal elections but instead resign from active politics by the end of the parliamentary term.

== Other activities ==
- KfW, Ex-Officio Member of the Board of Supervisory Directors (since 2011)
- Deutscher Raiffeisenverband (DRV), Member of the Presidium (2008–2011)
- Raiffeisenbank Kaisersesch-Kaifenheim, chairman of the supervisory board (2002–2011)
