= Klaus Bremm =

German politician (1923–2008)

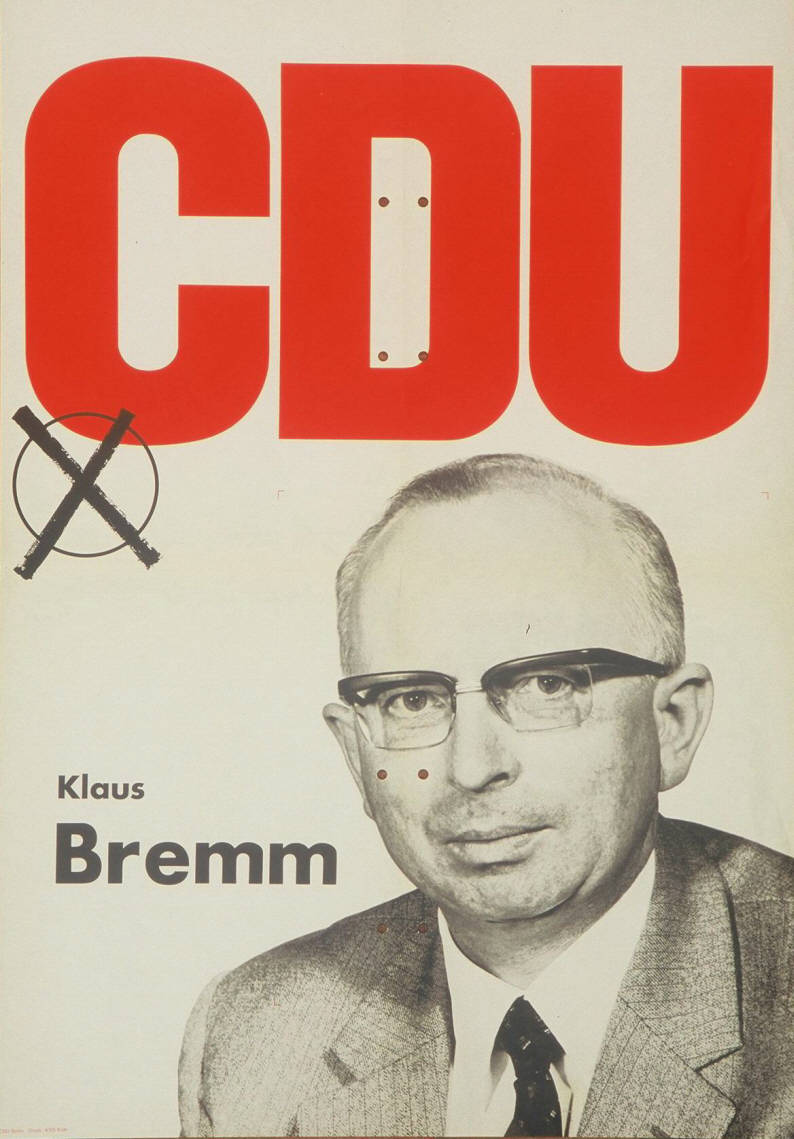
- Klaus Bremms candidate poster for the 1969 federal elections

Member of the Bundestag
- In office 20 October 1969 – 13 December 1976

Personal details
- Born: 3 January 1923 Zell (Mosel)
- Died: 27 September 2008 (aged 85) Alf, Rhineland-Palatinate, Rhineland-Palatinate, Germany
- Party: CDU

Klaus Bremm (January 3, 1923 – September 27, 2008) was a German politician of the Christian Democratic Union (CDU) and former member of the German Bundestag.

== Life ==
In 1950 he joined the CDU. From 1951 to 1966 he was first deputy chairman and then chairman of the Zell CDU district association until 1969.

Bremm had been a council member of the town of Zell since 1952 and was elected to the Zell district council in 1957. In 1964 he was elected to the district committee. From 1960 to 1970 he was CDU faction leader in the Zell city council. From 1967 until his resignation on 17 October 1969, he was a member of the Rhineland-Palatinate state parliament. In the state parliament he was a member of the Petitions Committee. He was a member of the German Bundestag from 1969 to 1976. In Parliament he represented the constituency of Cochem.

== Literature ==
Herbst, Ludolf; Jahn, Bruno (2002). Vierhaus, Rudolf (ed.). Biographisches Handbuch der Mitglieder des Deutschen Bundestages. 1949–2002 [Biographical Handbook of the Members of the German Bundestag. 1949–2002] (in German). München: De Gruyter - De Gruyter Saur. p. 1715. ISBN 978-3-11-184511-1.
