= Lötzbeuren =

- Municipality
- Coat of arms

- Location of Lötzbeuren within Bernkastel-Wittlich district
- Interactive map of Lötzbeuren
- Location within Germany Location within Rhineland-Palatinate
- Coordinates: 49°56′17″N 7°13′14″E
- Country: Germany
- State: Rhineland-Palatinate
- District: Bernkastel-Wittlich
- Municipal assoc.: Traben-Trarbach

Government
  - Mayor (2019–24): Thomas Alexander Barth

Area
  - Total: 10.20 km^{2} (3.94 sq mi)
- Elevation: 430 m (1,410 ft)

Population (2025-12-31)
  - Total: 472
  - Density: 46.3/km^{2} (120/sq mi)
- Time zone: UTC+01:00 (CET)
  - Summer (DST): UTC+02:00 (CEST)
- Postal codes: 56843
- Dialling codes: 06543
- Vehicle registration: WIL
- Website: www.loetzbeuren.de

Lötzbeuren is an Ortsgemeinde – a municipality belonging to a Verbandsgemeinde, a kind of collective municipality – in the Bernkastel-Wittlich district in Rhineland-Palatinate, Germany.

== Geography ==
The municipality lies in the Hunsrück and belongs to the Verbandsgemeinde of Traben-Trarbach, whose seat is in the like-named town. Nearby lies Frankfurt-Hahn Airport.

== History ==
About Lötzbeuren’s mediaeval history, little is known for sure. Until the 18th century, it was a bone of contention between the Palatine and Badish joint lords of the County of Sponheim as to whether the village lay in the “Further” or “Hinder” County. In 1332, Lötzbeuren was under the Further County’s ownership, but seems to have transferred to the Hinder County by 1417. Nevertheless, the Further County’s lords time and again tried to assert their rights, especially Baden, which claimed Lötzbeuren for the Further County and as of 1707 regarded it as a Badish possession without, however, having any lasting success. In 1776, Baden finally forsook the village in Palatinate-Zweibrücken's favour. At the same time, however, there was also a dispute with the Electorate of Trier over who held sovereignty. Since Electoral-Trier serfs were the overwhelming majority of the population, Trier deemed the village to be among its holdings. Moreover, there were further claims by other lords, making the situation quite convoluted. It is known that about the year 1637, Lötzbeuren had 36 townsmen, of whom 16 were of Electoral-Trier origin, 7 of Sponheim origin, 4 each of Palatinate-Simmern, Rhinegravial and Oberstein origin and one of Schmidtburg origin. Worth noting, however, is that only two of these were not Lutheran. One of the Sponheimers was Catholic and one of the Palatinate-Simmern townsmen was Reformed. It is therefore easy to see that Palatinate-Birkenfeld, the more influential of the Hinder County’s two joint lords eventually managed to assert itself, at least in the ecclesiastical sphere. It cannot be said, though, exactly when and how the Reformation was introduced into Lötzbeuren, but it might well have been not long after 1557, when the Hinder County of Sponheim saw the Reformation in. To this day, Lötzbeuren is an Evangelical community.

Owing to the tangle of disputes that reigned at the time, the villagers of Lötzbeuren might well have taken themselves to be a “free village” where no lord had any rights but those that he could exercise over his serfs. Thus it might well have been that no jurisdictional lord was recognized. For any misdeed, one had to turn to the jurists who answered to the lord under whose ownership the serf or serfs in question stood. Only in this light can one understand the Reverend Caspar Streccius’s words, which he wrote upon leaving Lötzbeuren in 1632 or 1633 as a result of the dispute, to take up the parish clergyman’s post at Irmenach:

Dialectal German	English translation
Hierauf nahm ich mir in den Sinn, Zu Lützbeurn forth zu bleiben imm', Denn sehr ein ruchlos Volk es ist, Lässt sich regir'n zu keiner Frist. Sind vielerley Herrschaft unterthon, Von keinem sich wollen regiren lohn.	Hereupon I got it into my mind, To leave Lötzbeuren evermore to keep away, For very nefarious folk they are, Who let themselves rule with no respite. Even if subject to all kinds of lordship, By none they want to have themselves ruled.

The church that stands today comes from 1718. Within are found many paintings, some of which were only rediscovered in the 1950s. Furthermore, the church houses a one-manual Stumm organ from 1745.

When the Hinder County of Sponheim was divided in 1776, Lötzbeuren passed together with the whole Oberamt of Trarbach to Palatinate-Zweibrücken-Birkenfeld. In the wars that came in the French Revolution’s wake, the County’s history came to an end. The area passed into Prussian possession and Lötzbeuren was assigned to the Bürgermeisterei of Büchenbeuren in the new Zell district. In 1969, Lötzbeuren belonged for a short while to the Rhein-Hunsrück-Kreis, until in 1970, at its own wish, it was annexed to the Verbandsgemeinde of Traben-Trarbach in the Bernkastel-Wittlich district.

== Politics ==
=== Municipal council ===
The council is made up of 12 council members, who were elected by majority vote at the municipal election held on 7 June 2009, and the honorary mayor as chairman.

=== Coat of arms ===
The German blazon reads: Geteilt, oben in goldenem Feld ein blauer Pflug, unten in rotem Feld ein silberner Rost.

The municipality’s arms might in English heraldic language be described thus: Per fess Or a plough azure and gules a gridiron argent.

The plough stands for the villagers’ old livelihood, agriculture. The gridiron is Saint Lawrence’s attribute, for he is the parish’s patron saint. The tinctures gules and argent (red and silver) refer to the Hinder County of Sponheim, which was involved with the village for centuries.

The arms were designed by A. Friderichs of Zell an der Mosel.

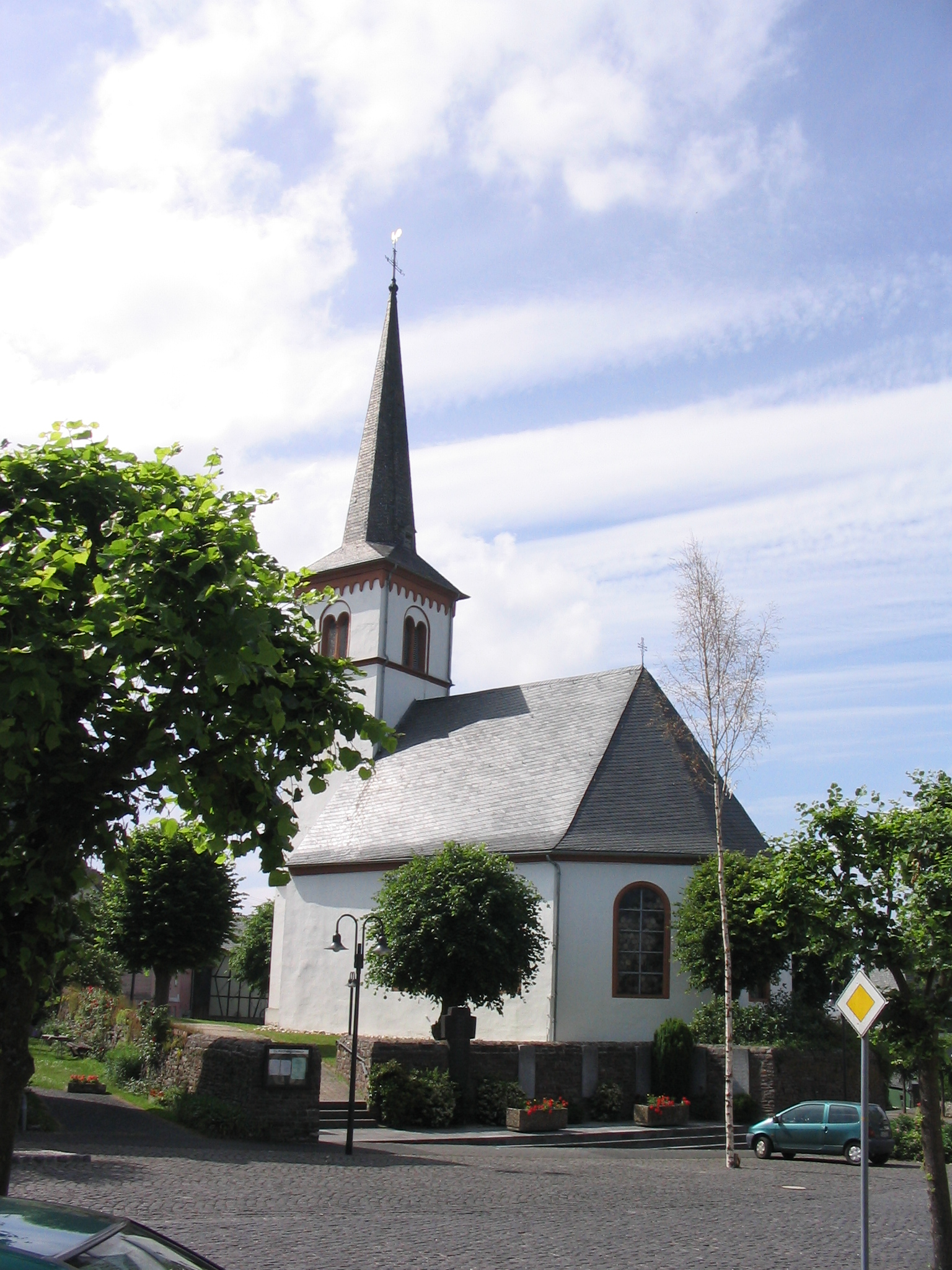
Evangelical church in Lötzbeuren

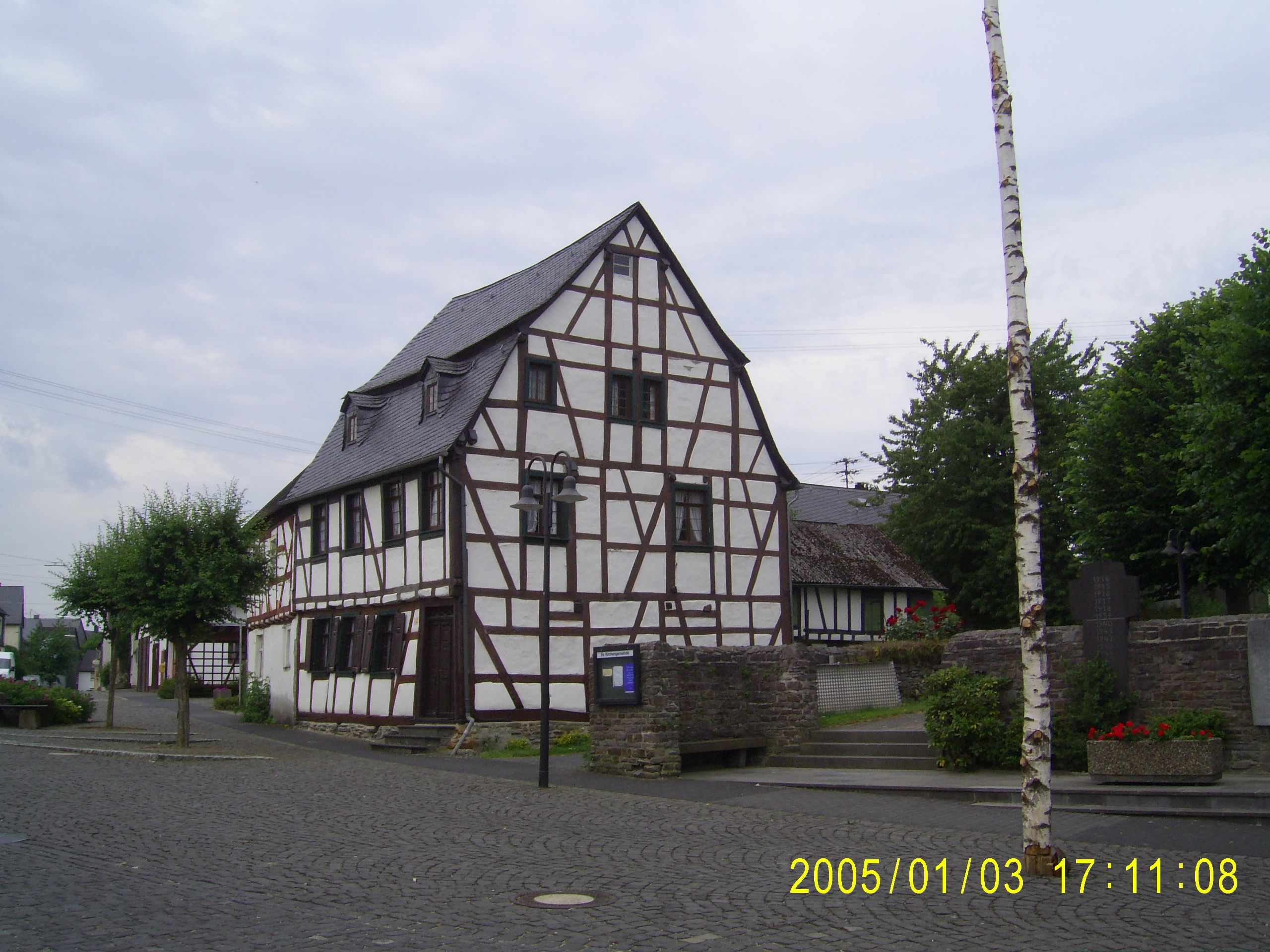
Timber-frame house in the village centre
