= Piesport =

- Municipality
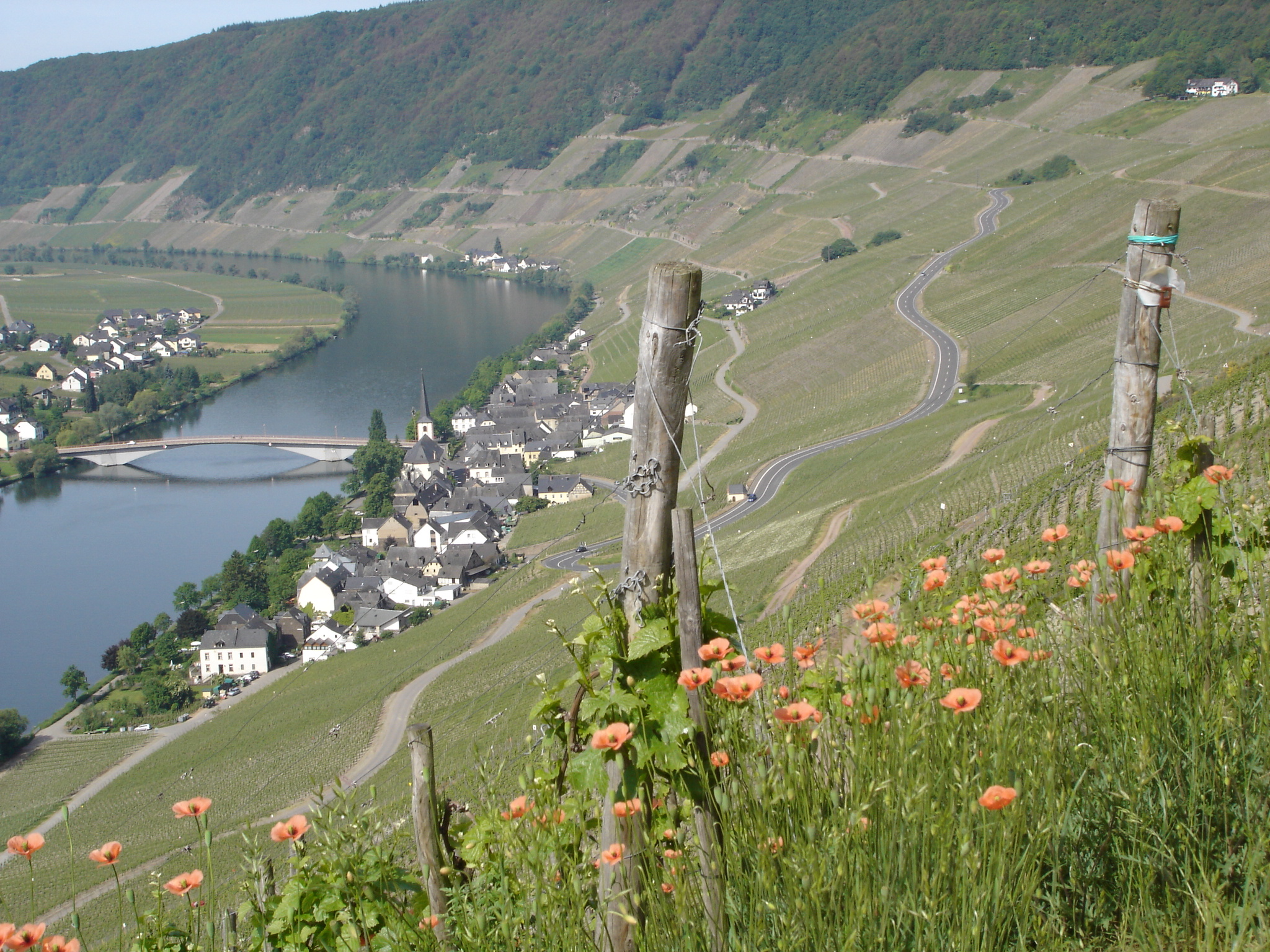

- Coat of arms

- Location of Piesport within Bernkastel-Wittlich district
- Interactive map of Piesport
- Location within Germany Location within Rhineland-Palatinate
- Coordinates: 49°52′40″N 06°55′30″E
- Country: Germany
- State: Rhineland-Palatinate
- District: Bernkastel-Wittlich
- Municipal assoc.: Bernkastel-Kues

Government
  - Mayor (2019–24): Stefan Schmitt

Area
  - Total: 19.60 km^{2} (7.57 sq mi)
- Elevation: 119 m (390 ft)

Population (2025-12-31)
  - Total: 2,000
  - Density: 100/km^{2} (260/sq mi)
- Time zone: UTC+01:00 (CET)
  - Summer (DST): UTC+02:00 (CEST)
- Postal codes: 54498
- Dialling codes: 06507
- Vehicle registration: WIL
- Website: www.piesport.de

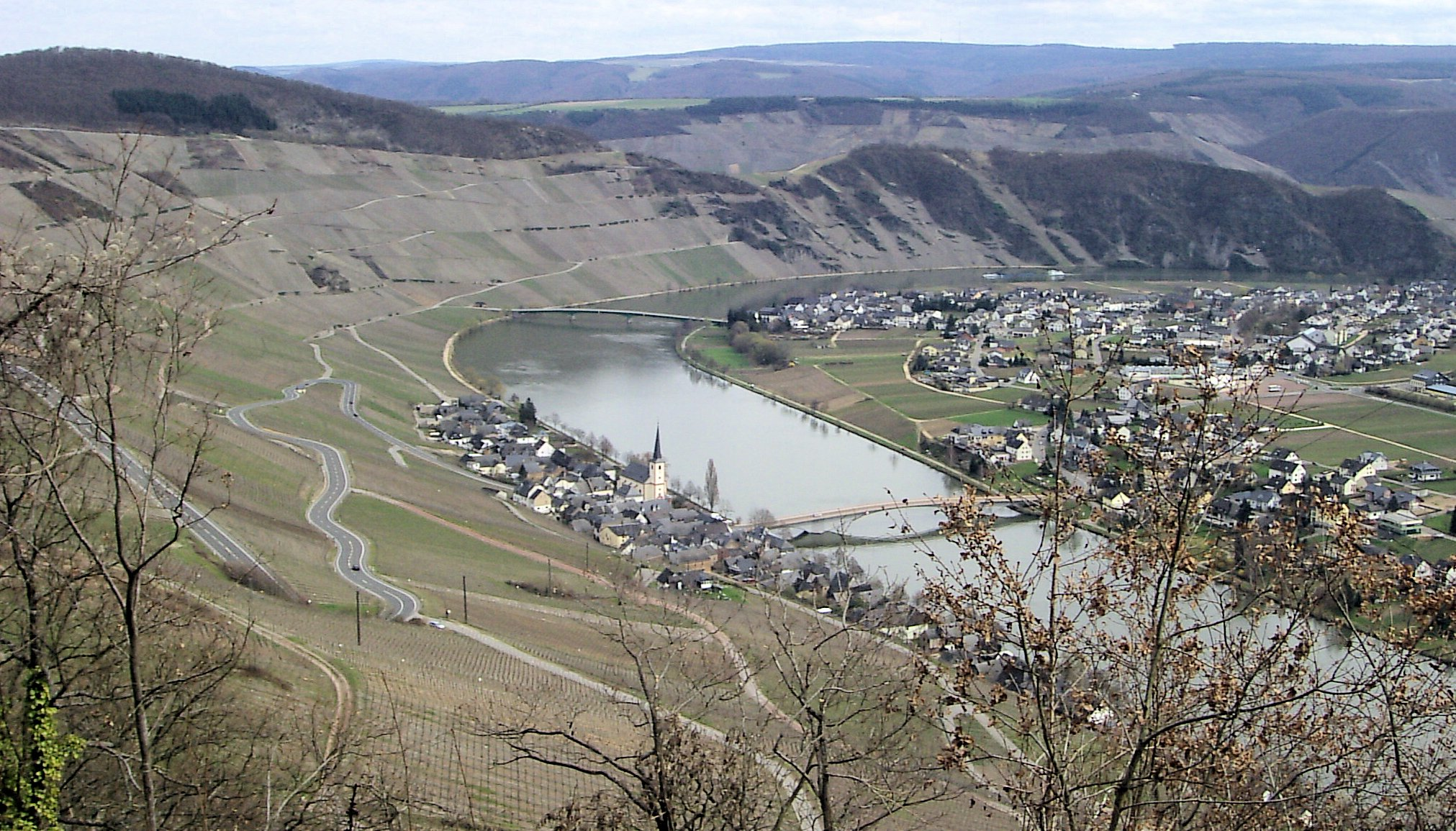
View of the Moselle's horseshoe bend as seen from Ferres

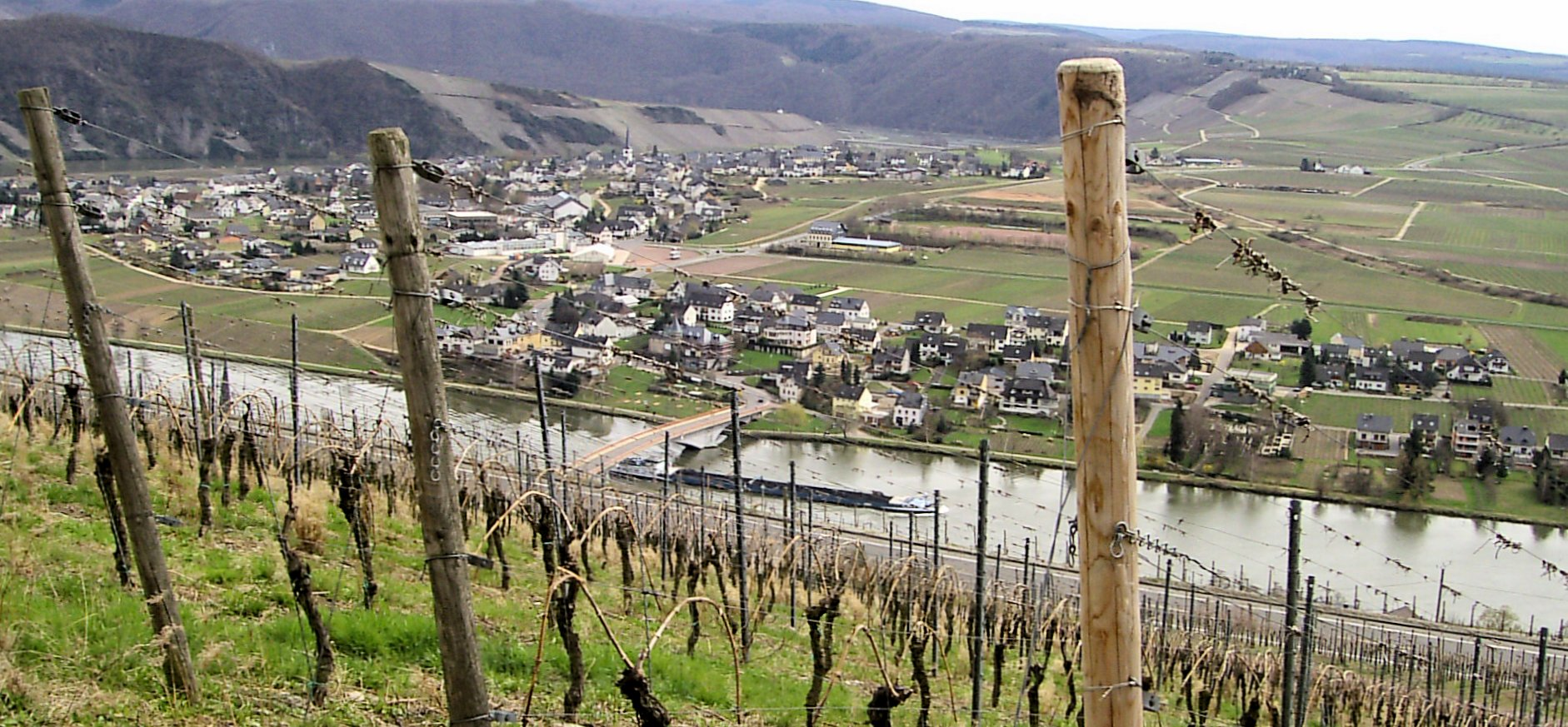
View of Piesport

Piesport is an Ortsgemeinde – a municipality belonging to a Verbandsgemeinde, a kind of collective municipality – in the Bernkastel-Wittlich district in Rhineland-Palatinate, Germany.

== Geography ==
=== Location ===
The municipality lies surrounded by vineyards, meadows and woods in the Moselle valley between Bernkastel-Kues and Trier. It is the biggest winegrowing centre in the Mosel wine region. Piesport is found on the river's right bank where the valley begins to broaden out into country marked by utterly flat riverbank slopes. On the other side of the river, steep slopes lead up to the Eifel.

Piesport belongs to the Verbandsgemeinde of Bernkastel-Kues, whose seat is in the like-named town.

=== Constituent communities ===
Piesport's Ortsteile are Piesport, Niederemmel (Emmel, Reinsport and Müstert) and Ferres.

=== Climate ===
Yearly precipitation in Piesport amounts to 737 mm, falling into the middle third of the precipitation chart for all Germany. At 49% of the German Weather Service's weather stations, lower figures are recorded. The driest month is February. The most rainfall comes in June. In that month, precipitation is twice what it is in February. Precipitation varies only minimally and is extremely evenly spread throughout the year. At only 3% of the weather stations lower seasonal swings are recorded.

== History ==
The region around Piesport was settled as early as Roman times by the Romans. “Like an amphitheatre’s rows”, wrote the poet Ausonius, the vineyards framed the place. Between the centres of Alt-Piesport and Ferres, the biggest Roman wine pressing facility north of the Alps was unearthed in 1985, and partly reconstructed. It is the focus of the yearly Römisches Kelterfest (“Roman Wine Press Festival”) held on the second weekend in October. Other Roman finds have led to the conclusion that the village was once an important port. It was dedicated to Bigontius, a local deity, whence the name Porto Pigonto was derived, which eventually mutated into “Piesport”.

In the Middle Ages and early modern times, Piesport belonged to the Electorate of Trier. Beginning in 1794, Piesport lay under French rule. In 1815 it was assigned to the Kingdom of Prussia at the Congress of Vienna. Since 1946, it has been part of the then newly founded state of Rhineland-Palatinate.

Today's municipality was newly formed on 7 June 1969 from the dissolved municipalities of (503 inhabitants) and Niederemmel (1,633 inhabitants).

== Politics ==
The municipal council is made up of 16 council members, who were elected by proportional representation at the municipal election held on 7 June 2009, and the honorary mayor as chairman.

The municipal election held on 7 June 2009 yielded the following results:

Year	SPD	CDU	WGR	Total
2009	2	9	5	16 seats
2004	3	5	8	16 seats

== Culture and sightseeing ==
=== Moselloreley ===
Near Piesport lies the Moselloreley, a similar formation to the Loreley on the Rhine. The craggy massif that rises steeply out of the Moselle allows no transport links downstream, nor is there even any room for a footpath. Nevertheless, here and there on its steep slopes are found vineyards. For a decade in the 1930s, there was mining here. Above the Moselloreley runs a hiking trail.

=== Winegrowing ===
Piesport is to a considerable extent characterized by winegrowing, and with 413 ha of vineyard area under cultivation is by far the biggest winegrowing centre in the Mosel wine region. Traditionally it is mainly Riesling grapes that are grown here. The municipality is part of the wine area of Bernkastel. The vineyards are part of the winemaking appellation – Großlage – of Michelsberg. A distinction is made among the following ten vineyards:

- Günterslay
- Treppchen
- Falkenberg
- Goldtröpfchen
- Domherr
- Schubertslay
- Grafenberg
- Gärtchen
- Kreuzwingert
- Hofberger

Theo Haart from the Haart Wine Estate in Piesport was chosen in November 2006 by the magazine Gault Millau as “Winemaker of the Year 2007”.

== See also ==
- Piesporter
