= Bitburg (electoral district) =

Federal electoral district of Germany

201 Bitburg
- Electoral district for the Bundestag
- Bitburg in 2025
- State: Rhineland-Palatinate
- Population: 217,800 (2019)
- Electorate: 161,723 (2025)
- Major settlements: Wittlich; Bitburg; Daun
- Area: 3,102.3 km^{2}

Current electoral district
- Created: 1949
- Party: CDU
- Member: Patrick Schnieder
- Elected: 2009, 2013, 2017, 2021, 2025

Bitburg is an electoral constituency (German: Wahlkreis) represented in the Bundestag. It elects one member via first-past-the-post voting. Under the current constituency numbering system, it is designated as constituency 201. It is located in northwestern Rhineland-Palatinate, comprising the Bitburg-Prüm district, Vulkaneifel district, and the northern part of the Bernkastel-Wittlich district.

Bitburg was created for the inaugural 1949 federal election. Since 2009, it has been represented by Patrick Schnieder of the Christian Democratic Union (CDU).

== Geography ==
Bitburg is located in northwestern Rhineland-Palatinate. As of the 2021 federal election, it comprises the entirety of the Bitburg-Prüm and Vulkaneifel districts as well as, from the Bernkastel-Wittlich district, the municipality of Wittlich, the Verbandsgemeinde of Wittlich-Land, and the municipalities of Bausendorf, Bengel, Diefenbach, Flußbach, Hontheim, Kinderbeuern, Kinheim, Kröv, Reil, and Willwerscheid from the Traben-Trarbach Verbandsgemeinde.

== History ==
Bitburg was created in 1949, then known as Prüm. It acquired its current name in the 1965 election. In the 1949 election, it was Rhineland-Palatinate constituency 6 in the numbering system. In the 1953 through 1976 elections, it was number 153. In the 1980 through 1998 elections, it was number 151. In the 2002 election, it was number 205. In the 2005 election, it was number 204. In the 2009 and 2013 elections, it was number 203. In the 2017 and 2021 elections, it was number 202. From the 2025 election, it has been number 201.

Originally, the constituency comprised the districts of Bitburg, Prüm, Daun, and Wittlich. It acquired its current borders in the 1965 election, although when the former Verbandsgemeinde of Kröv-Bausendorf was merged into the Traben-Trarbach Verbandsgemeinde in 2014, only its area remained in the constituency.

Election	No.	Name	Borders
1949	6	Prüm	Bitburg district; Prüm district; Daun district; Wittlich district
1953	153	Prüm	Bitburg district; Prüm district; Daun district; Wittlich district
1957	153	Prüm	Bitburg district; Prüm district; Daun district; Wittlich district
1961	153	Prüm	Bitburg district; Prüm district; Daun district; Wittlich district
1965	153	Bitburg	Bitburg-Prüm district; Vulkaneifel district; Bernkastel-Wittlich district (only Wittlich municipality and Wittlich-Land and Traben-Trarbach (only Bausendorf, Bengel, Diefenbach, Flußbach, Hontheim, Kinderbeuern, Kinheim, Kröv, Reil, and Willwerscheid municipalities) Verbandsgemeinden)
1969	153	Bitburg	Bitburg-Prüm district; Vulkaneifel district; Bernkastel-Wittlich district (only Wittlich municipality and Wittlich-Land and Traben-Trarbach (only Bausendorf, Bengel, Diefenbach, Flußbach, Hontheim, Kinderbeuern, Kinheim, Kröv, Reil, and Willwerscheid municipalities) Verbandsgemeinden)
1972	153	Bitburg	Bitburg-Prüm district; Vulkaneifel district; Bernkastel-Wittlich district (only Wittlich municipality and Wittlich-Land and Traben-Trarbach (only Bausendorf, Bengel, Diefenbach, Flußbach, Hontheim, Kinderbeuern, Kinheim, Kröv, Reil, and Willwerscheid municipalities) Verbandsgemeinden)
1976	153	Bitburg	Bitburg-Prüm district; Vulkaneifel district; Bernkastel-Wittlich district (only Wittlich municipality and Wittlich-Land and Traben-Trarbach (only Bausendorf, Bengel, Diefenbach, Flußbach, Hontheim, Kinderbeuern, Kinheim, Kröv, Reil, and Willwerscheid municipalities) Verbandsgemeinden)
1980	151	Bitburg	Bitburg-Prüm district; Vulkaneifel district; Bernkastel-Wittlich district (only Wittlich municipality and Wittlich-Land and Traben-Trarbach (only Bausendorf, Bengel, Diefenbach, Flußbach, Hontheim, Kinderbeuern, Kinheim, Kröv, Reil, and Willwerscheid municipalities) Verbandsgemeinden)
1983	151	Bitburg	Bitburg-Prüm district; Vulkaneifel district; Bernkastel-Wittlich district (only Wittlich municipality and Wittlich-Land and Traben-Trarbach (only Bausendorf, Bengel, Diefenbach, Flußbach, Hontheim, Kinderbeuern, Kinheim, Kröv, Reil, and Willwerscheid municipalities) Verbandsgemeinden)
1987	151	Bitburg	Bitburg-Prüm district; Vulkaneifel district; Bernkastel-Wittlich district (only Wittlich municipality and Wittlich-Land and Traben-Trarbach (only Bausendorf, Bengel, Diefenbach, Flußbach, Hontheim, Kinderbeuern, Kinheim, Kröv, Reil, and Willwerscheid municipalities) Verbandsgemeinden)
1990	151	Bitburg	Bitburg-Prüm district; Vulkaneifel district; Bernkastel-Wittlich district (only Wittlich municipality and Wittlich-Land and Traben-Trarbach (only Bausendorf, Bengel, Diefenbach, Flußbach, Hontheim, Kinderbeuern, Kinheim, Kröv, Reil, and Willwerscheid municipalities) Verbandsgemeinden)
1994	151	Bitburg	Bitburg-Prüm district; Vulkaneifel district; Bernkastel-Wittlich district (only Wittlich municipality and Wittlich-Land and Traben-Trarbach (only Bausendorf, Bengel, Diefenbach, Flußbach, Hontheim, Kinderbeuern, Kinheim, Kröv, Reil, and Willwerscheid municipalities) Verbandsgemeinden)
1998	151	Bitburg	Bitburg-Prüm district; Vulkaneifel district; Bernkastel-Wittlich district (only Wittlich municipality and Wittlich-Land and Traben-Trarbach (only Bausendorf, Bengel, Diefenbach, Flußbach, Hontheim, Kinderbeuern, Kinheim, Kröv, Reil, and Willwerscheid municipalities) Verbandsgemeinden)
2002	205	Bitburg	Bitburg-Prüm district; Vulkaneifel district; Bernkastel-Wittlich district (only Wittlich municipality and Wittlich-Land and Traben-Trarbach (only Bausendorf, Bengel, Diefenbach, Flußbach, Hontheim, Kinderbeuern, Kinheim, Kröv, Reil, and Willwerscheid municipalities) Verbandsgemeinden)
2005	204	Bitburg	Bitburg-Prüm district; Vulkaneifel district; Bernkastel-Wittlich district (only Wittlich municipality and Wittlich-Land and Traben-Trarbach (only Bausendorf, Bengel, Diefenbach, Flußbach, Hontheim, Kinderbeuern, Kinheim, Kröv, Reil, and Willwerscheid municipalities) Verbandsgemeinden)
2009	203	Bitburg	Bitburg-Prüm district; Vulkaneifel district; Bernkastel-Wittlich district (only Wittlich municipality and Wittlich-Land and Traben-Trarbach (only Bausendorf, Bengel, Diefenbach, Flußbach, Hontheim, Kinderbeuern, Kinheim, Kröv, Reil, and Willwerscheid municipalities) Verbandsgemeinden)
2013	203	Bitburg	Bitburg-Prüm district; Vulkaneifel district; Bernkastel-Wittlich district (only Wittlich municipality and Wittlich-Land and Traben-Trarbach (only Bausendorf, Bengel, Diefenbach, Flußbach, Hontheim, Kinderbeuern, Kinheim, Kröv, Reil, and Willwerscheid municipalities) Verbandsgemeinden)
2017	202	Bitburg	Bitburg-Prüm district; Vulkaneifel district; Bernkastel-Wittlich district (only Wittlich municipality and Wittlich-Land and Traben-Trarbach (only Bausendorf, Bengel, Diefenbach, Flußbach, Hontheim, Kinderbeuern, Kinheim, Kröv, Reil, and Willwerscheid municipalities) Verbandsgemeinden)
2021	202	Bitburg	Bitburg-Prüm district; Vulkaneifel district; Bernkastel-Wittlich district (only Wittlich municipality and Wittlich-Land and Traben-Trarbach (only Bausendorf, Bengel, Diefenbach, Flußbach, Hontheim, Kinderbeuern, Kinheim, Kröv, Reil, and Willwerscheid municipalities) Verbandsgemeinden)
2025	201	Bitburg	Bitburg-Prüm district; Vulkaneifel district; Bernkastel-Wittlich district (only Wittlich municipality and Wittlich-Land and Traben-Trarbach (only Bausendorf, Bengel, Diefenbach, Flußbach, Hontheim, Kinderbeuern, Kinheim, Kröv, Reil, and Willwerscheid municipalities) Verbandsgemeinden)

== Members ==
The constituency has been held continuously by the Christian Democratic Union (CDU) since its creation. It was first represented by Matthias Joseph Mehs from 1949 to 1953, followed by Hans Richarts from 1953 to 1972. Alois Mertes then served from 1972 to 1987. Peter Rauen was representative from 1987 to 2009. Patrick Schnieder was elected in 2009, and re-elected in 2013, 2017, 2021, and 2025.

Election	Member	Party	%
1949	Matthias Joseph Mehs	CDU	80.2
1953	Hans Richarts	CDU	79.6
1957	Hans Richarts	CDU	79.6
1961	Hans Richarts	CDU	76.5
1965	Hans Richarts	CDU	74.9
1969	Hans Richarts	CDU	68.5
1972	Alois Mertes	CDU	66.6
1976	Alois Mertes	CDU	69.7
1980	Alois Mertes	CDU	65.2
1983	Alois Mertes	CDU	69.9
1987	Peter Rauen	CDU	60.9
1990	Peter Rauen	CDU	57.2
1994	Peter Rauen	CDU	57.1
1998	Peter Rauen	CDU	52.2
2002	Peter Rauen	CDU	52.3
2005	Peter Rauen	CDU	49.0
2009	Patrick Schnieder	CDU	46.1
2013	Patrick Schnieder	CDU	56.0
2017	Patrick Schnieder	CDU	51.2
2021	Patrick Schnieder	CDU	37.8
2025	Patrick Schnieder	CDU	40.2

== Election results ==
=== 2025 election ===
Federal election (2025): Bitburg
Notes:	Blue background denotes the winner of the electorate vote. Pink background denotes a candidate elected from their party list. Yellow background denotes an electorate win by a list member, or other incumbent. A ✓ or ✗ denotes status of any incumbent, win or lose respectively.						
Party	Candidate	Votes	%	±%	Party votes	%	±%
CDU	✓ Patrick Schnieder	53,458	40.2	▲2.4	48,896	36.6	▲6.5
AfD	Boris Schnee	22,265	16.7	▲10.3	23,936	17.9	▲10.8
SPD	Lena Werner	27,098	20.4	▼7.1	22,634	16.9	▼11.0
Greens	Stephan Lequen	7,362	5.5	▼1.4	10,070	7.5	▼1.7
FW	Rudolf Rinnen	11,825	8.9	▲0.3	7,030	5.3	▼1.6
Left	Klaus Becker	4,894	3.7	▲1.3	6,622	5.0	▲2.3
FDP	Anna Röhl	4,154	3.1	▼4.2	6,041	4.5	▼6.9
BSW					4,982	3.7	New
Tierschutzpartei					1,482	1.1	▼0.1
Volt	Clara Lehnertz	1,918	1.4	New	870	0.7	▲0.3
PARTEI					581	0.4	▼0.4
ÖDP					262	0.2	▼0.1
BD					192	0.1	New
MLPD					16	<0.1	0.0
Informal votes		1,590			950		
Total valid votes		132,974			133,614		
Turnout		134,564	83.2	▲7.1			
CDU hold	Majority	26,360	19.8	▲9.4			

=== 2021 election ===
Federal election (2021): Bitburg
Notes:	Blue background denotes the winner of the electorate vote. Pink background denotes a candidate elected from their party list. Yellow background denotes an electorate win by a list member, or other incumbent. A ✓ or ✗ denotes status of any incumbent, win or lose respectively.						
Party	Candidate	Votes	%	±%	Party votes	%	±%
CDU	✓ Patrick Schnieder	46,340	37.8	▼13.4	37,086	30.1	▼14.3
SPD	Lena Werner	33,632	27.4	▲1.7	34,343	27.9	▲6.1
FW	Petra Fischer	10,566	8.6	▲6.3	8,460	6.9	▲5.6
FDP	Ralf Berlingen	9,011	7.4	▲0.4	13,997	11.4	▲1.1
Greens	Dorothea Hafner	8,512	6.9		11,411	9.3	▲3.1
AfD	Beate Härig-Dickersbach	7,947	6.5	▼0.6	8,794	7.1	▼0.9
Left	Manuel Eppers	2,875	2.3	▼3.1	3,265	2.7	▼3.3
Tierschutzpartei					1,473	1.2	
PARTEI	Markus Riebschläger	1,619	1.3		1,038	0.8	▲0.1
dieBasis	Christoph Lutz	1,436	1.2		1,434	1.2	
Volt					409	0.3	
Pirates					364	0.3	0.0
ÖDP	Clemens Ruhl	659	0.5	▼0.6	356	0.3	▼0.1
Team Todenhöfer					234	0.2	
NPD					107	0.1	▼0.1
Humanists					80	0.1	
DiB					77	0.1	
V-Partei3					70	0.1	▼0.1
LKR					44	0.0	
MLPD					12	0.0	0.0
Informal votes		1,852			1,395		
Total valid votes		122,597			123,054		
Turnout		124,449	76.1	▼1.0			
CDU hold	Majority	12,708	10.4	▼15.1			

=== 2017 election ===
Federal election (2017): Bitburg
Notes:	Blue background denotes the winner of the electorate vote. Pink background denotes a candidate elected from their party list. Yellow background denotes an electorate win by a list member, or other incumbent. A ✓ or ✗ denotes status of any incumbent, win or lose respectively.						
Party	Candidate	Votes	%	±%	Party votes	%	±%
CDU	✓ Patrick Schnieder	63,719	51.2	▼4.7	55,591	44.5	▼7.7
SPD	Jan Pauls	32,017	25.7	▼0.7	27,255	21.8	▼0.5
AfD	Beate Härig-Dickersbach	8,840	7.1		10,058	8.0	▲4.4
FDP	Jürgen Krämer	8,703	7.0	▲3.7	12,888	10.3	▲4.2
Greens					7,710	6.2	▲0.1
Left	Katharina Penkert	6,786	5.5	▲2.1	7,433	5.9	▲1.6
FW	Henning Wunderlich	2,927	2.4	▼0.1	1,627	1.3	▼0.3
PARTEI					952	0.8	
ÖDP	Erik Hofmann	1,390	1.1	▲0.7	477	0.4	▲0.1
Pirates					377	0.3	▼1.5
V-Partei³					242	0.2	
NPD					232	0.2	▼0.6
BGE					182	0.1	
MLPD					24	0.0	0.0
Informal votes		2,497			1,831		
Total valid votes		124,382			125,048		
Turnout		126,879	77.1	▲5.4			
CDU hold	Majority	31,702	25.5	▼4.2			

=== 2013 election ===
Federal election (2013): Bitburg
Notes:	Blue background denotes the winner of the electorate vote. Pink background denotes a candidate elected from their party list. Yellow background denotes an electorate win by a list member, or other incumbent. A ✓ or ✗ denotes status of any incumbent, win or lose respectively.						
Party	Candidate	Votes	%	±%	Party votes	%	±%
CDU	✓ Patrick Schnieder	65,252	56.0	▲9.9	61,192	52.2	▲11.1
SPD	Jens Jenssen	30,613	26.3	▲2.2	26,189	22.3	▲3.3
Greens	Alice Endres	5,775	5.0	▼3.0	7,165	6.1	▼2.3
Left	Ali Damar	3,867	3.3	▼3.6	5,134	4.4	▼3.8
FDP	Marco Weber	3,807	3.3	▼10.6	7,136	6.1	▼13.0
AfD					4,264	3.6	
FW	Johannes Mans	2,875	2.5		1,925	1.6	
Pirates	Stefan Trös	2,068	1.8		2,159	1.8	▲0.4
NPD	Erich Wilhelm Krames	1,063	0.9	▼0.2	904	0.8	▼0.1
Party of Reason	Rainer Hoffmann	843	0.7		550	0.5	
ÖDP	Heide Weidemann	429	0.4		305	0.3	0.0
PRO					176	0.2	
REP					135	0.1	▼0.2
MLPD					33	0.0	0.0
Informal votes		2,706			2,031		
Total valid votes		116,592			117,267		
Turnout		119,298	71.7	▲0.5			
CDU hold	Majority	34,639	29.7	▲7.7			

=== 2009 election ===
Federal election (2009): Bitburg
Notes:	Blue background denotes the winner of the electorate vote. Pink background denotes a candidate elected from their party list. Yellow background denotes an electorate win by a list member, or other incumbent. A ✓ or ✗ denotes status of any incumbent, win or lose respectively.						
Party	Candidate	Votes	%	±%	Party votes	%	±%
CDU	Patrick Schnieder	53,705	46.1	▼2.9	48,270	41.0	▼2.9
SPD	Elke Leonhard	28,042	24.1	▼12.4	22,419	19.1	▼11.0
FDP	Edmund Geisen	16,213	13.9	▲8.1	22,500	19.1	▲6.3
Greens	Ulrike Höfken	9,274	8.0	▲4.1	9,922	8.4	▲2.7
Left	Hanna Bettina Stratmann	8,043	6.9	▲3.1	9,642	8.2	▲3.6
Pirates					1,717	1.5	
FAMILIE					1,237	1.1	0.0
NPD	Mario Winter	1,295	1.1	▼0.1	1,021	0.9	▼0.2
REP					354	0.3	▼0.1
ÖDP					266	0.2	
PBC					149	0.1	▼0.1
DVU					92	0.1	
MLPD					22	0.0	0.0
Informal votes		3,429			2,390		
Total valid votes		116,572			117,611		
Turnout		120,001	71.3	▼7.1			
CDU hold	Majority	25,663	22.0	▲9.5			

=== 2005 election ===
Federal election (2005):Bitburg
Notes:	Blue background denotes the winner of the electorate vote. Pink background denotes a candidate elected from their party list. Yellow background denotes an electorate win by a list member, or other incumbent. A ✓ or ✗ denotes status of any incumbent, win or lose respectively.						
Party	Candidate	Votes	%	±%	Party votes	%	±%
CDU	✓ Peter Rauen	63,253	49.0	▼3.3	56,908	43.9	▼4.5
SPD	Elke Leonhard	47,087	36.4	▲0.7	38,928	30.0	▼2.4
FDP	Sigrid Thiel	7,443	5.8	▼1.3	16,636	12.8	▲3.2
Greens	Ulrike Höfken	4,923	3.8	▼1.1	7,442	5.7	▼0.8
Left	Bernhard Hilgers	4,875	3.8		5,968	4.6	▲3.9
NPD	Achim Jakowitz	1,614	1.2		1,396	1.1	▲0.7
Familie					1,419	1.1	
REP					57765	0.4	0.0
PBC					230	0.2	0.0
MLPD					76	0.1	
Informal votes		3,428			3,043		
Total valid votes		129,195			129,580		
Turnout		132,623	78.4	▼1.3			
CDU hold	Majority	16,166	12.6				
