= Kröv-Bausendorf =

Former municipality in Rhineland-Palatinate, Germany

Coordinates: 49°58′39″N 7°05′05″E

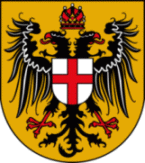
Coat of arms

Kröv-Bausendorf is a former Verbandsgemeinde ("collective municipality") in the district Bernkastel-Wittlich, in Rhineland-Palatinate, Germany. On 1 July 2014 it merged into the Verbandsgemeinde Traben-Trarbach. Its seat of administration was in the village Kröv, which is situated on the river Moselle, approx. 15 km east of Wittlich.

Kröv-Bausendorf consisted of the following Ortsgemeinden ("local municipalities"):

1. Bausendorf
2. Bengel
3. Diefenbach
4. Flußbach
5. Hontheim
6. Kinderbeuern
7. Kinheim
8. Kröv
9. Reil
10. Willwerscheid
