= Krov =

Krov or KROV may refer to

- Kröv, a municipality in Rhineland-Palatinate, Germany
- Kröv-Bausendorf, a former municipality in Rhineland-Palatinate, Germany
- KROV (FM), a radio station (91.1 FM) licensed to serve Oroville, California, United States
- KROV-FM, a radio station based in San Antonio, Texas, United States
- Krov za krov, a studio album by the Russian heavy metal band Aria
