= Burg, Bernkastel-Wittlich =

Burg (Mosel)
- Municipality
- Flag Coat of arms

- Location of Burg (Mosel) within Bernkastel-Wittlich district
- Interactive map of Burg (Mosel)
- Location within Germany Location within Rhineland-Palatinate
- Coordinates: 50°00′29.10″N 7°07′20.41″E
- Country: Germany
- State: Rhineland-Palatinate
- District: Bernkastel-Wittlich
- Municipal assoc.: Traben-Trarbach

Government
  - Mayor (2019–24): Rudolf Bucher

Area
  - Total: 3.37 km^{2} (1.30 sq mi)
- Elevation: 110 m (360 ft)

Population (2025-12-31)
  - Total: 344
  - Density: 102/km^{2} (264/sq mi)
- Time zone: UTC+01:00 (CET)
  - Summer (DST): UTC+02:00 (CEST)
- Postal codes: 56843
- Dialling codes: 06551
- Vehicle registration: WIL
- Website: www.burg-mosel.de

Burg (Mosel) (German pronunciation: [bʊʁk]) is an Ortsgemeinde – a municipality belonging to a Verbandsgemeinde, a kind of collective municipality – in the Bernkastel-Wittlich district in Rhineland-Palatinate, Germany. It is purely a winegrowing and tourism centre.

== Geography ==
=== Location ===
The municipality lies on the Moselle’s right bank between Koblenz and Trier near Traben-Trarbach and Zell.

=== Land use ===
The municipal area spreads over 361.83 ha, of which 111.94 ha is given over to vineyards – with two grape varieties planted (70% with Riesling and 30% with Müller-Thurgau) – 102.88 ha is wooded, 83.32 ha is properties – mostly under municipal ownership – and 63.69% is made up of various other areas. With the opening of new lands for building, the village expanded to the municipal limit with Enkirch, taking on a whole new appearance with the building of 25 new Aussiedlerhöfe (rural developments outside an existing village).

=== Neighbouring municipalities ===
Clockwise from the north, these are Pünderich, Briedel, Zell, Enkirch and Kröv.

Missing: Reil, Kövenig, and Traben-Trarbach,

== History ==
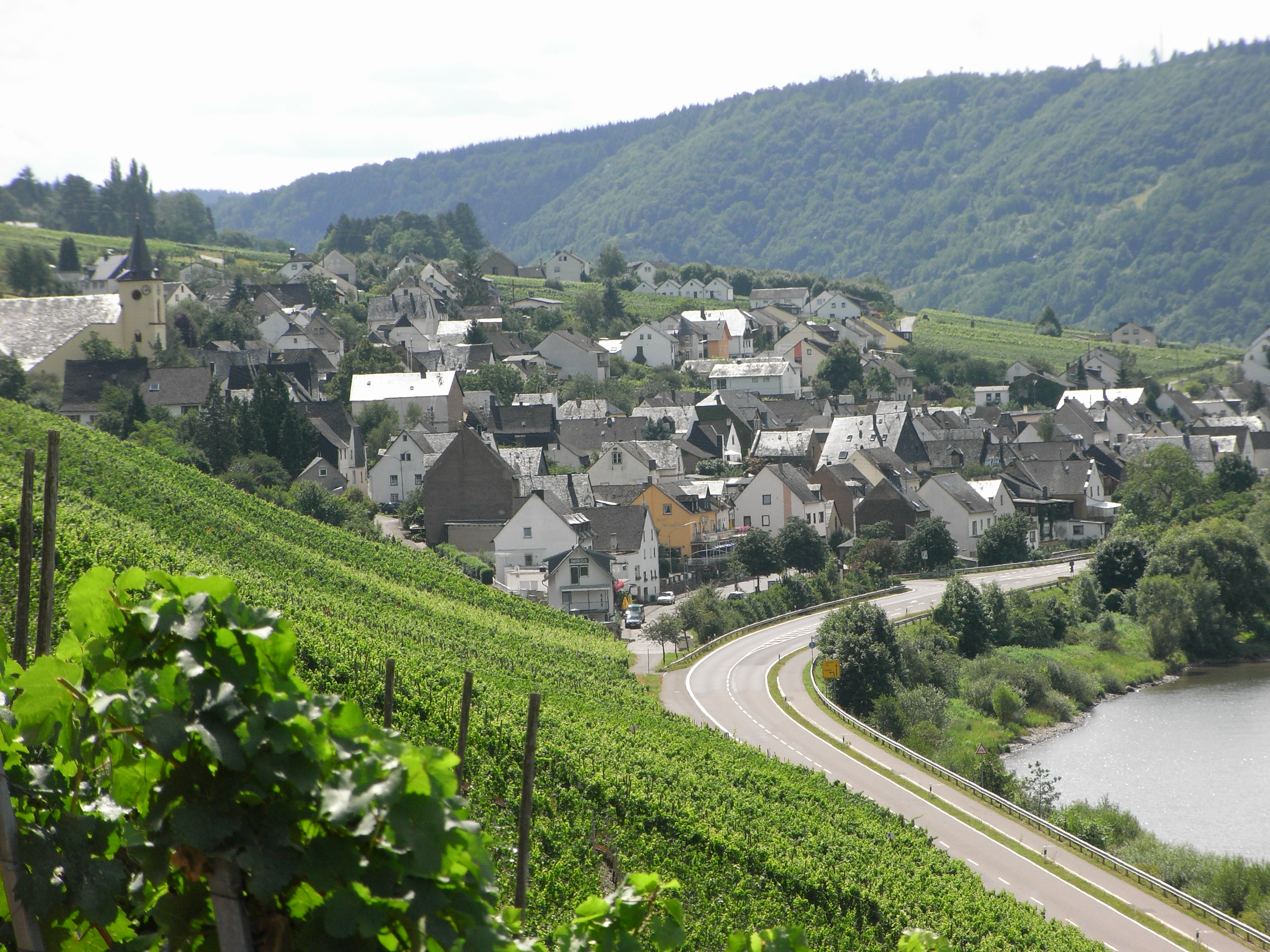
Burg seen from the north

The name Burg – which means “Castle” in German – seems to base itself on the existence of a Roman castellum here. In 928, Burg had its first documentary mention when Gilbert, Duke of Lorraine bequeathed Burg to Archbishop of Trier Rutger as a donation. The Archbishopric of Trier was the landlord until 1794. With the upheavals of the French Revolution, Burg fell under French rule, and in 1814, after Napoleon's downfall, it became part of the Kingdom of Prussia. Since 1947, it has been part of the then newly founded state of Rhineland-Palatinate. The epithet “(Mosel)” has been borne since 1 May 1970.

== Politics ==
The municipal council is made up of 8 council members, who were elected by majority vote at the municipal election held on 7 June 2009, and the honorary mayor as chairman.
