= Patrick Schnieder =

German politician (born 1968)

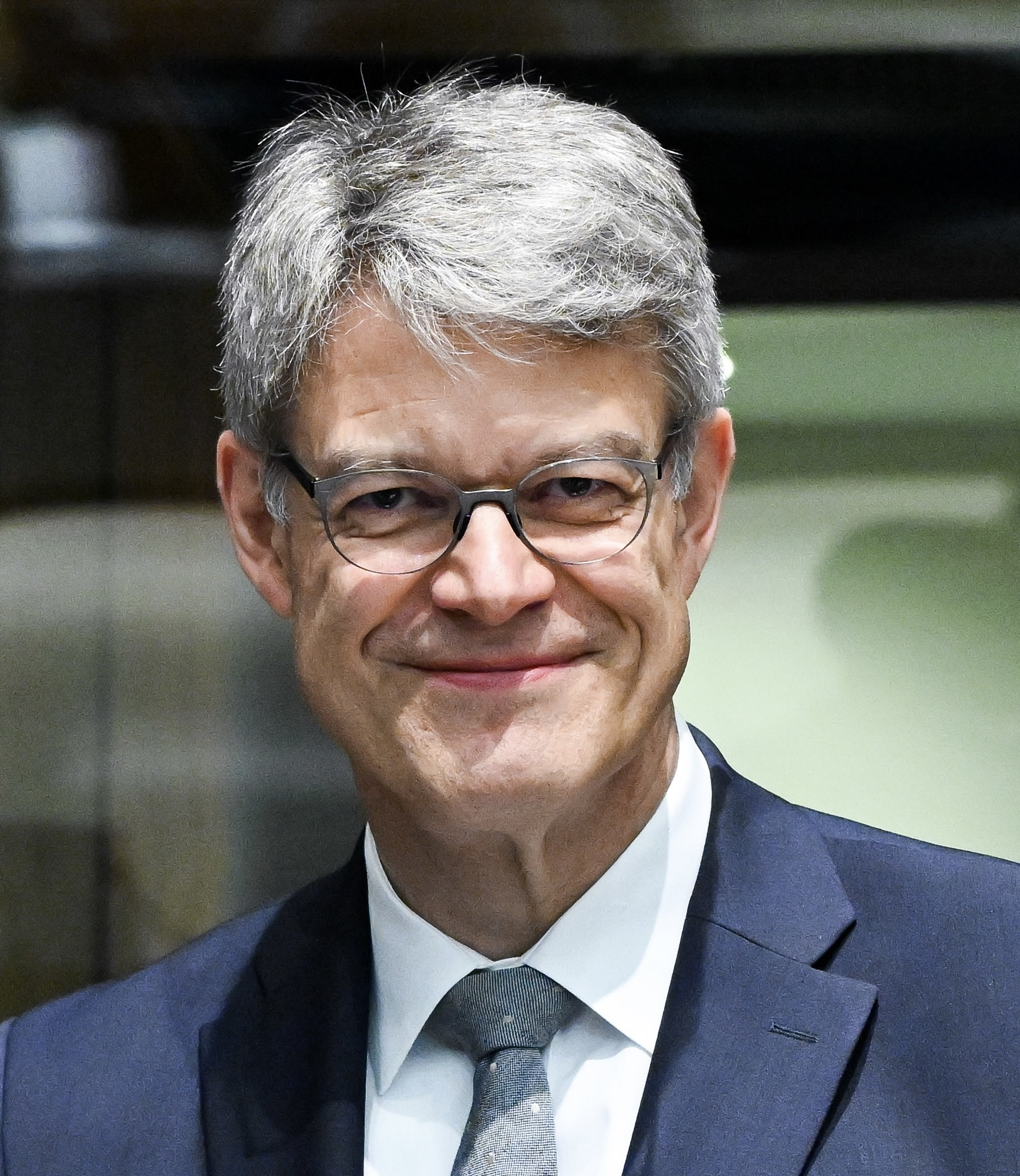
- Schnieder in 2025

Minister of Transport
- In office 6 May 2025 – 29 July 2026
- Chancellor: Friedrich Merz
- Preceded by: Volker Wissing (as Minister of Digital and Transport)
- Succeeded by: Steffen Bilger

Member of the Bundestag for Bitburg
- Incumbent
- Assumed office 27 September 2009

Personal details
- Born: 1 May 1968 (age 58) Kyllburg, West Germany (now Germany)
- Party: Christian Democratic Union (since 1984)
- Education: University of Bonn
- Occupation: Politician

Military service
- Allegiance: Germany
- Branch/service: Bundeswehr
- Years of service: 1987–1988

Patrick Schnieder (born 1 May 1968) is a German lawyer and politician of the Christian Democratic Union (CDU) who served as Federal Minister for Transport in the government of Chancellor Friedrich Merz from May 2025 to July 2026. He has been a member of the Bundestag from the state of Rhineland-Palatinate since 2009.

== Political career ==
=== Career in state politics ===
From 2011 until 2018, Schnieder served as Secretary General of the CDU in Rhineland-Palatinate, under the leadership of chairwoman Julia Klöckner. During his time in office, he managed the party's campaign for the 2016 state elections.

=== Member of the German Parliament, 2009–present ===
Schnieder first became a member of the Bundestag after the 2009 German federal election, elected in the district of Bitburg. In Parliament, he was a member of the Committee on Verification of Credentials and Immunities and the Committee on Transport and Digital Infrastructure.

In addition to his committee assignments, Schnieder has been chairing the German Parliamentary Friendship Group with Belgium and Luxembourg since 2014. He is also part of the German-Italian Parliamentary Friendship Group and the German-Japanese Parliamentary Friendship Group. Since 2019, he has been a member of the German delegation to the Franco-German Parliamentary Assembly.

Within the CDU/CSU parliamentary group, Schnieder has been leading the group of CDU parliamentarians from Rhineland-Palatinate since the 2017 elections. In the negotiations to form a coalition government under the leadership of Chancellor Angela Merkel following the elections, he was part of the working group on transport and infrastructure, led by Michael Kretschmer, Alexander Dobrindt and Sören Bartol.

== Other activities ==
- KfW, Ex-Officio Member of the Supervisory Board (since 2025)
- Federal Network Agency for Electricity, Gas, Telecommunications, Post and Railway (BNetzA), Alternate Member of the Advisory Board (since 2014)
- German Red Cross (DRK), Member
- Association of German Foundations, Member of the Parliamentary Advisory Board (2009-2017)

== Political positions ==
In June 2017, Schnieder voted against Germany’s introduction of same-sex marriage.

In 2019, Schnieder joined 14 members of his parliamentary group who, in an open letter, called for the party to rally around Angela Merkel and party chairwoman Annegret Kramp-Karrenbauer amid criticism voiced by conservatives Friedrich Merz and Roland Koch.

== Private life ==
Schnieder is married. His brother is German politician Gordon Schnieder (CDU).
