= Koblenz–Trier railway =

Railway in Germany

Koblenz–Trier
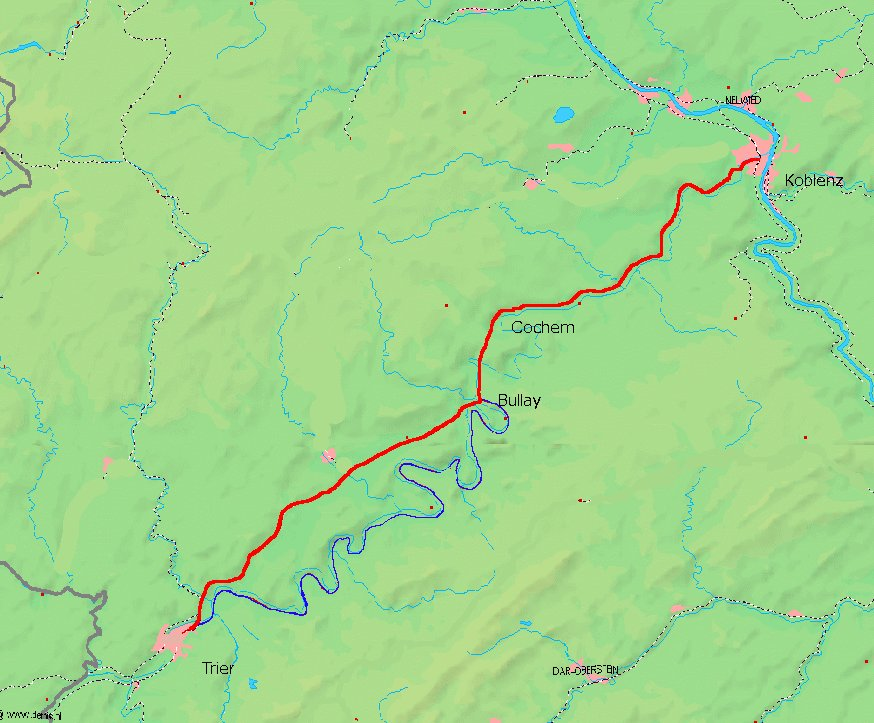
- Moselle line in red, Moselle Railway in blue

Overview
- Line number: 3010
- Locale: Rhineland-Palatinate, Germany

Service
- Route number: 690

Technical
- Line length: 113 km (70 mi)
- Number of tracks: 2
- Track gauge: 1,435 mm (4 ft 8 1/2 in) standard gauge
- Electrification: 15 kV/16.7 Hz AC overhead catenary
- Operating speed: 130 km/h (80.8 mph) (maximum)

The Koblenz–Trier Railway is a railway line in the German state of Rhineland-Palatinate, located mostly on the left (northern) bank of the Moselle, connecting Koblenz via Bullay to Trier. It is known in German as the Moselstrecke, i.e. "Moselle line". It is often called the Moselbahn links der Mosel ("Moselle railway left of the Moselle") to distinguish it from the Moselle Railway (Moselbahn) or Moselle Valley Railway (Moseltalbahn), which ran on the right (southern) bank of the Moselle from Bullay to Trier, but was abandoned in the 1960s. The line was built as part of the Cannons Railway (Kanonenbahn) and opened in 1879.

== Route ==
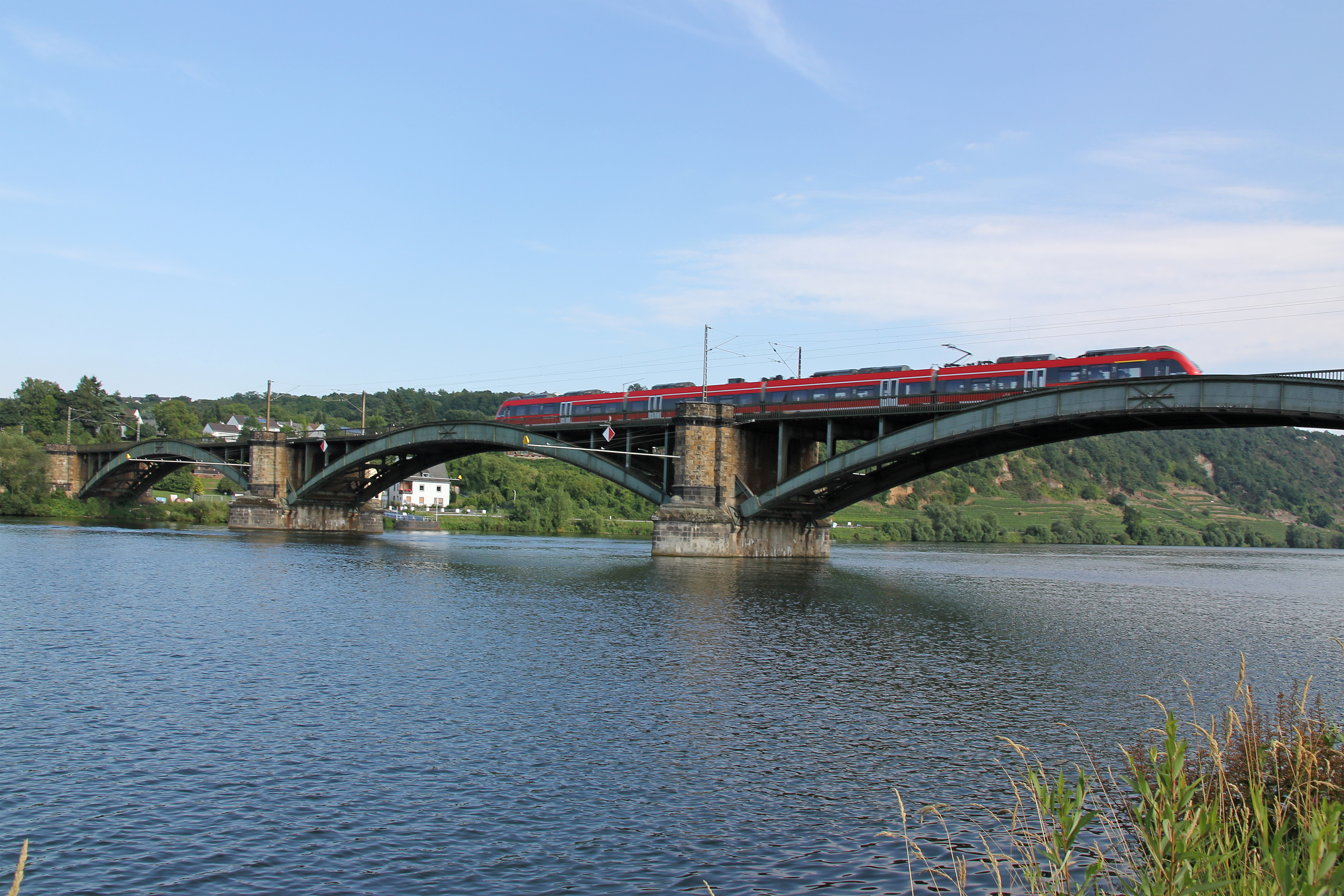
First Moselle crossing, the Güls railway bridge

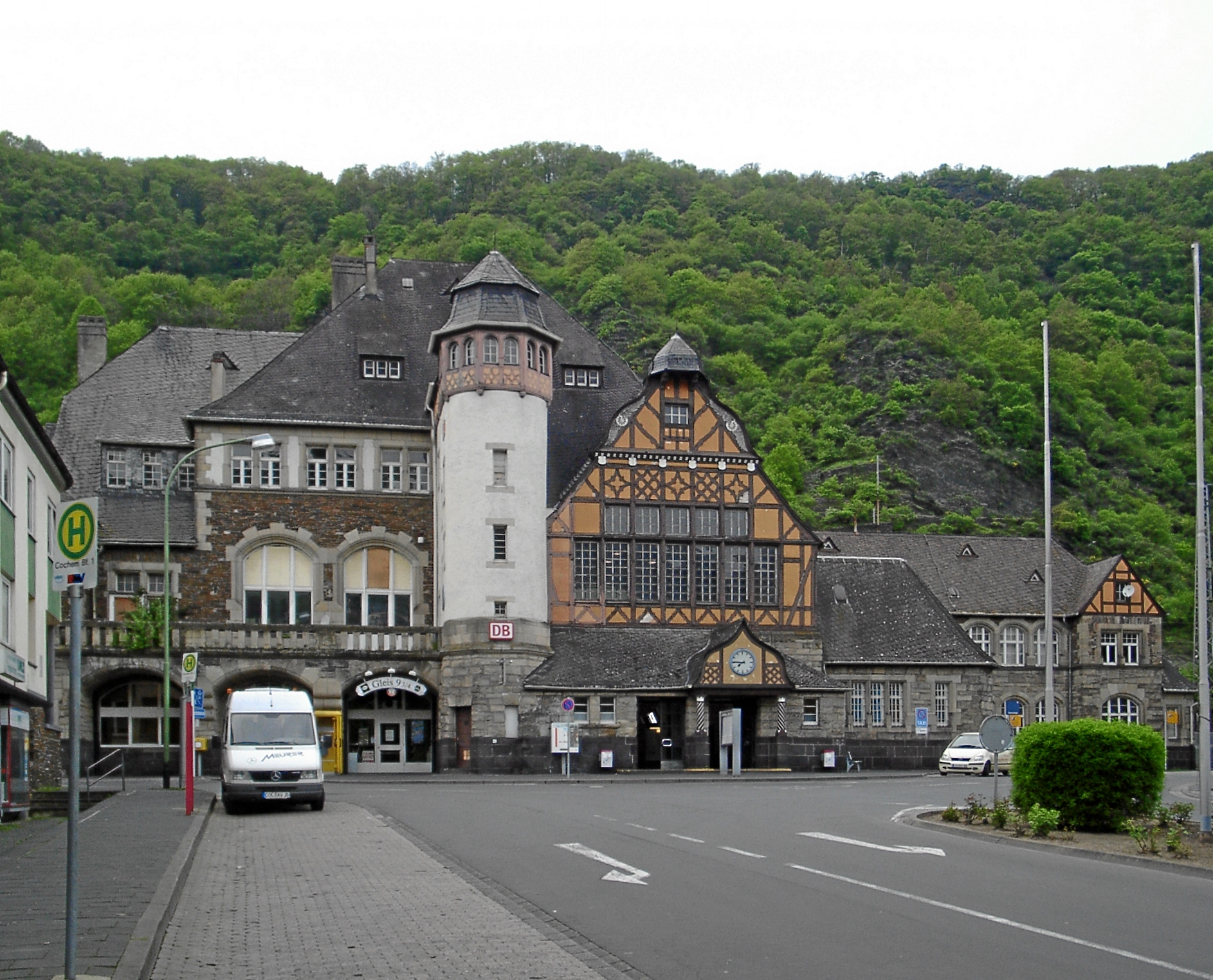
Cochem station

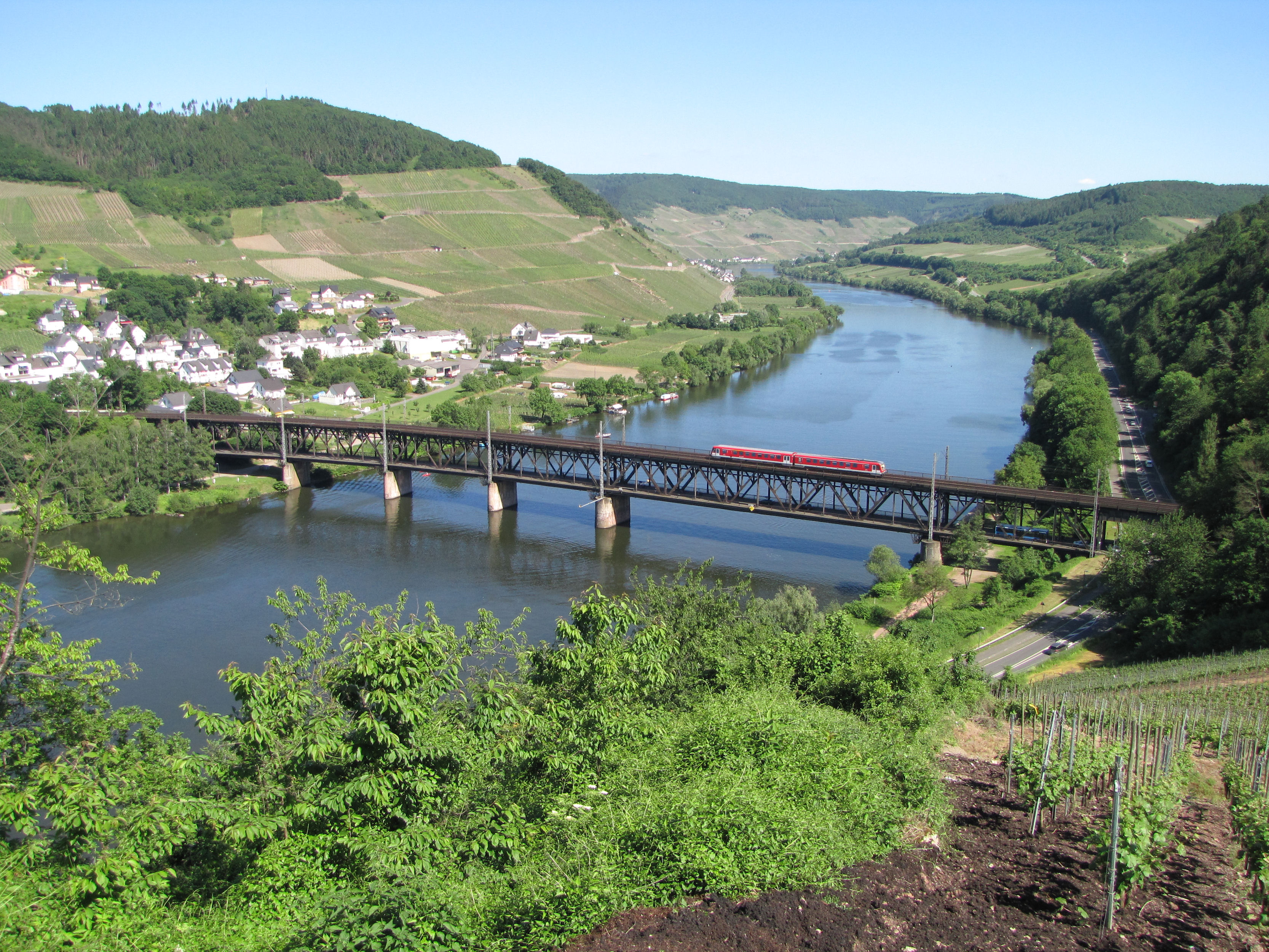
Alf-Bullay double-deck bridge

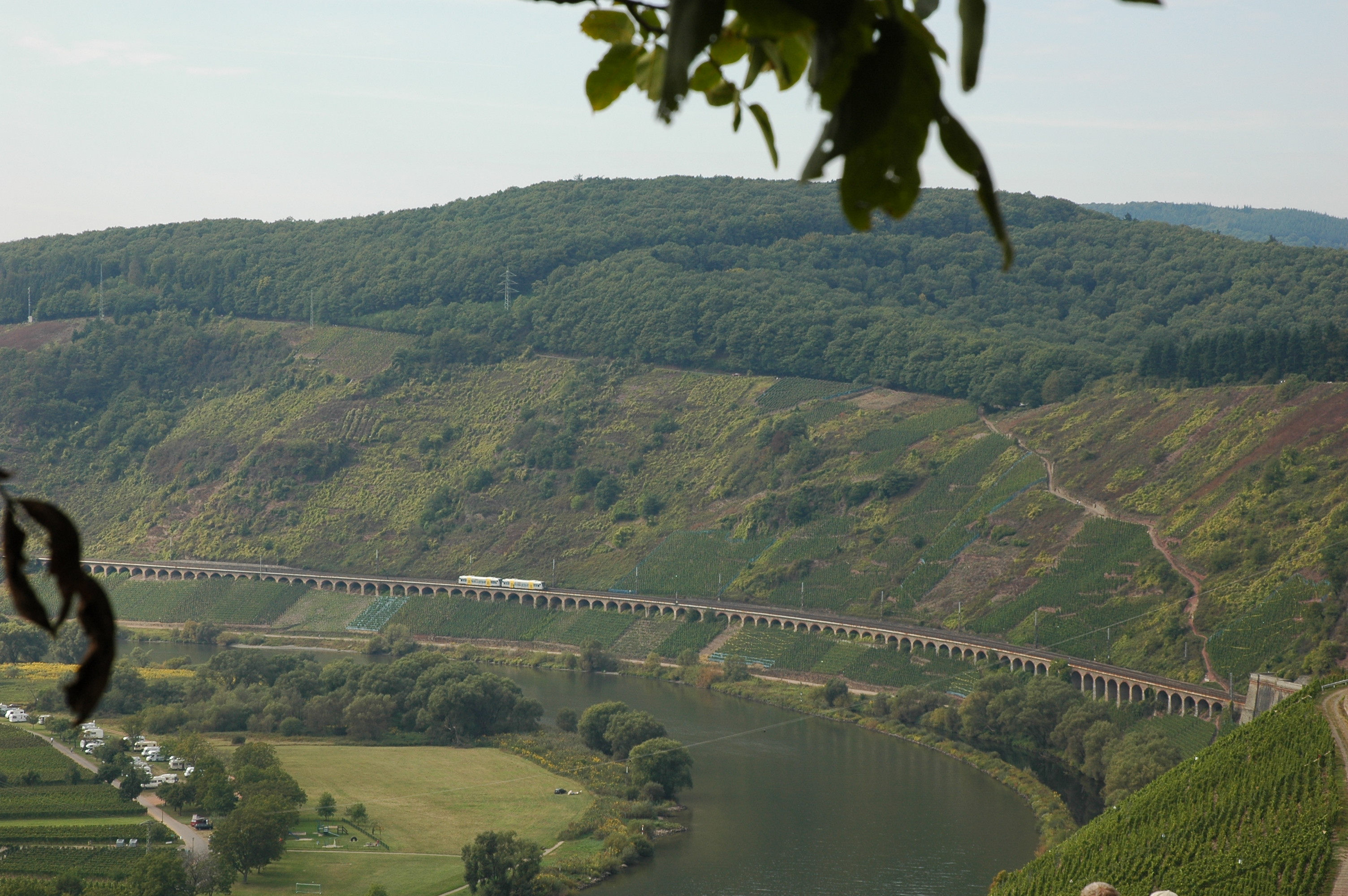
Hangviadukt near Pünderich

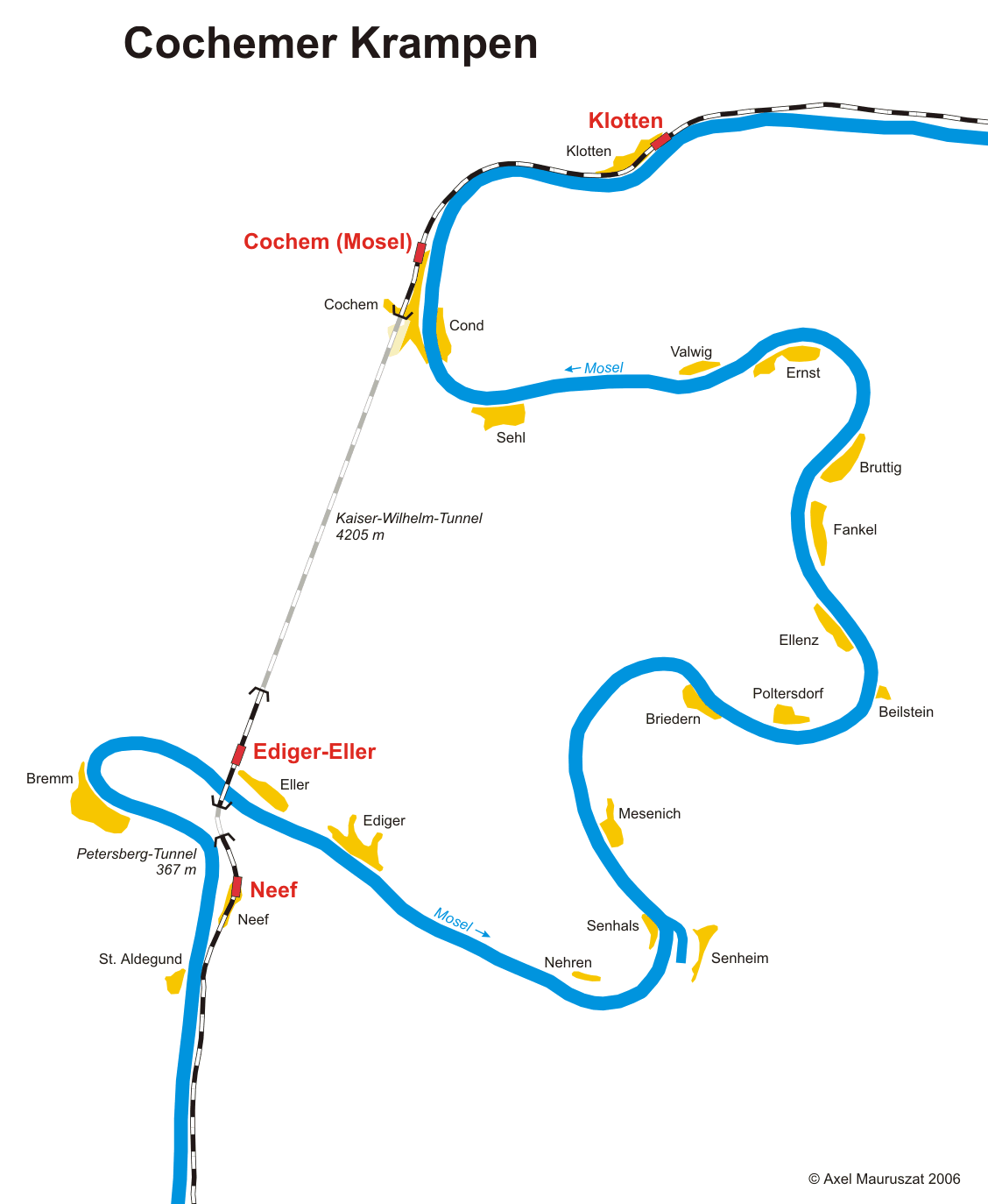
Map of Cochemer Krampen

The line leaves Koblenz Hauptbahnhof and diverges from the Left Rhine line, which leads to Cologne, and three km later it crosses the Moselle on the Güls railway bridge. It then runs for about 55 km on the left side of the river to Cochem.

Immediately after Cochem, it runs through the most important structure of the line, the Kaiser Wilhelm Tunnel, to Ediger-Eller to bypass a meandering section of the Moselle known as the Cochemer Krampen. The 4,205 metre long tunnel was the longest railway tunnel in Germany from 1877 until the opening of the Landrücken Tunnel in 1985.

After the Kaiser Wilhelm Tunnel the line crosses the Mosel near Eller on a 281 metre long, five span steel plate girder bridge. The line runs through another tunnel to Neef and Bullay before it returns to the northern bank of the Moselle, running over the Alf-Bullay double-deck bridge, which is shared by a roadway on the lower deck. This steel truss bridge has six spans and is 314 metres long with a maximum span of 72 metres.

Immediately after the Alf-Bullay bridge the line runs through a 458 metre long tunnel under the Prinzenkopf mountain, thus avoiding the Zell loop of the Moselle.

Near Pünderich the line runs over the longest Hangviadukt ("slope viaduct", that is a viaduct built on the edge of a hill requiring much higher supports on the downside that on the upside) on a railway line in Germany with a total length of 786 metres. The viaduct has 92 spans, each with internal diameter of 7.2 m. In Pünderich there was formerly an access point for passengers at the depot where the line to Traben-Trarbach branches off.

The railway leaves the Moselle Valley through another tunnel and continues to Wittlich. After about 40 km at Schweich the line again returns to the Moselle Valley and at Pfalzel in the city of Trier it crosses the Moselle for the fourth time. After a total of 113 km, including 6,845 m in six tunnels, the line ends at Trier Hauptbahnhof.

== History ==
The Koblenz–Trier line was built between 1874 and 1879. It was built as part of the strategic Cannons Railway from Berlin to Metz, now in France. It was operated by various state railways: originally by the Saarbrücken Railway, one of the Prussian state railways, then by Deutsche Reichsbahn, Deutsche Bundesbahn and now Deutsche Bahn.

The facilities of the Gründerzeit era stations are often highly significant technical and cultural monuments, but they are sometimes in a poor condition. Particularly significant is Cochem station, a masterpiece of the German Heimatstil ("home style") architectural style around the turn of the century.

=== Planned strategic line ===
In 1916 work began on a bypass of the Kaiser Wilhelm Tunnel (which had major ventilation problems in the age of steam, which grew with rapidly growing traffic, particularly as a major supply route to the Western Front during the first World War) along the southern side of the Moselle from Bullay to Karden along part of the Cochemer Krampen bends. The new construction was demanded by the German military as a strategic railway. Construction was abandoned in 1923. A 2,650 metre-long tunnel was finished between Treis and Bruttig; its portals were blown up in 1945. The never-used railway embankment still runs through most of the twin town of Bruttig-Fankel.

During the Second World War the tunnels were used for the production of a variety of armaments. A concentration camp was established in Bruttig to house prison labourers for this work. Today an old barracks of the camp remains, there are also old crosses in the cemetery marking these events.

=== Plans to bypass Trier ===
Planning was carried out before the First World War to provide a double track bypass for freight avoiding Trier and Ehrang to create a better connection to the Saar. In 1917 construction began on a massive 600 metre-long viaduct in concrete with natural stone facing on the northern bank of the Moselle at Quint. The bypass line would have joined the existing line in Schweich. Construction of the main structures were completed in the early 1920s, but the line was never opened. The viaduct existed until 1979, when it was demolished, with its material used to extend the B53 highway.

=== Modernisation ===
It was proposed in the 1950s to electrify the lines of the Saar with the modern French electrification system (25 kV, 50 Hz). Instead it was decided to canalise the Moselle between France and Germany. The Koblenz–Trier line was electrified in 1973, which is marked by a plaque at Trier station. On 16 January 1995, a centralised traffic control centre at Wittlich Hbf was put into operation, remotely controlling several signal boxes.

=== Current plans ===
The Federal Transport Infrastructure Plan included a proposal to upgrade the Luxembourg–Trier–Koblenz–Mainz line for the use of tilting trains. These plans have been abandoned. In the call for bids published by the Northern Railway Authority of the State of Rhineland-Palatinate issued on 3 November 2010, a completely new rail schedule was drawn starting in December 2014. The proposed contract covers 3,700,000 km per year from 2014 to 2029. Being part of the statewide synchronized timetable "Rheinland-Pfalz-Takt 2015", electric multiple unit express trains will run from Koblenz to Trier. In Trier the trains will be split and merged, one half going to and coming from Mannheim (via Saarbrücken), the other to and from Luxembourg. The train going to Luxembourg will be operated by the CFL. The hourly running local trains will all be at Koblenz at every full hour, at Trier every half-hour, to minimize changing times and to give best connections in every direction.

In early 2010 construction began on the second bore of the Kaiser Wilhelm Tunnel in Ediger-Eller. This was necessary in order to rehabilitate the existing tunnel. Although the new bore will be completed in 2012, it will only be single track. The old double track bore will then be rehabilitated and receive a single track. This work shall be completed in 2016, so for at least four years major changes in the timetables will be necessary.

== Operations ==
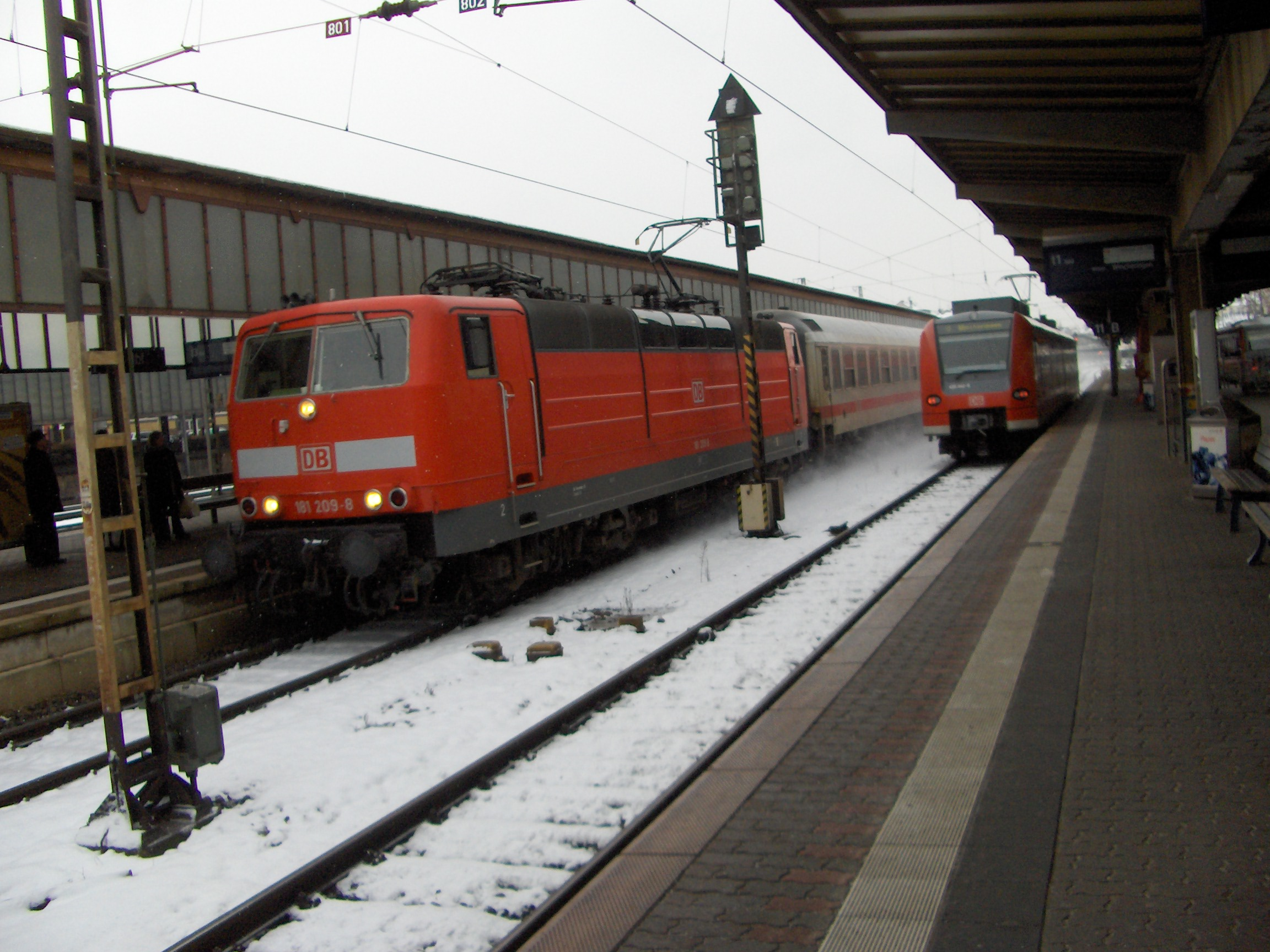
181 209 with IC 233 in Trier Hauptbahnhof

The line, despite its military origins, has achieved major economic significance in its region, including nearby France and Luxembourg. It is used by freight trains as well as local trains (Regionalbahn and Regional-Express). Fares are set by the transport authorities of the Rhine-Moselle Transport Association (Verkehrsverbund Rhein-Mosel) and Trier Region Transport Association (Verkehrsverbund Region Trier) as well as under the fare structure of Deutsche Bahn.

To avoid confusion with the former Moselle Railway (Moselbahn), some railway stations on the left (north) side still have names with the suffix "DB" (originally for Deutsche Bundesbahn). This is the case with Schweich (DB),Ürzig (DB) and Bullay (DB), which used also to have stations on the Moselle Railway.

Apart from regional passenger trains, the line was used by "D-trains" (Durchgangszug, express trains, literally "corridor trains"). The trains ran from Saarbrücken to Trier and on to Cologne over the Eifel Railway via Gerolstein or over the Moselle line via Koblenz. Until the electrification of Moselle line, D-trains ran on both routes equally. After electrification there was a clear preference for the Moselle line.

The Moselle line was included in the development of the Interregio network from 1988. In 1991 D-train services ran over the line from Saarbrücken via Koblenz, Cologne, Münster and Bremen to Cuxhaven, with a section of the trains running to Greifswald, at two-hour intervals. This was complemented by express trains between Koblenz and Saarbrücken operating at hourly intervals. It was not until 1994 with the completion of the conversion of the rolling stock into the new IR carriages that the D-train services were replaced by Interregio services, which continued to operate until December 2002.

=== Long-distance passenger services ===
After the abolition of Interregio services, they were replaced by InterCity (IC) services on line 31 operating between Luxembourg and Norddeich Mole or Emden at two-hour intervals. From December 2005 until December 2011 a pair of Intercity-Express (ICE) services of line 10 operated from Trier to Berlin, providing a daily service to the region. In November 2011, ICE services were discontinued and long-distance services were reduced to only two IC trains per day on the line. This service ended on 13 December 2014 with the introduction of the Rhineland-Palatinate integrated regular interval service (Rheinland-Pfalz-Taktes 2015) on the line.

Since the 2018 annual timetable, a daily pair of trains has again been running between Düsseldorf and Luxembourg. (Stadler KISS) double-deck multiple units of the CFL are used. On the Koblenz–Trier railway, the train runs as an RE, between Koblenz and Düsseldorf as an IC on behalf of DB Fernverkehr with the option of reserving seats and taking bicycles.

Line	Route
IC 37	Düsseldorf – Cologne – Bonn – Remagen – Andernach – Koblenz – Kobern-Gondorf – Treis-Karden – Cochem – Bullay – Wittlich – Schweich – Trier – Wasserbillig – Luxemburg

=== Local and regional services ===
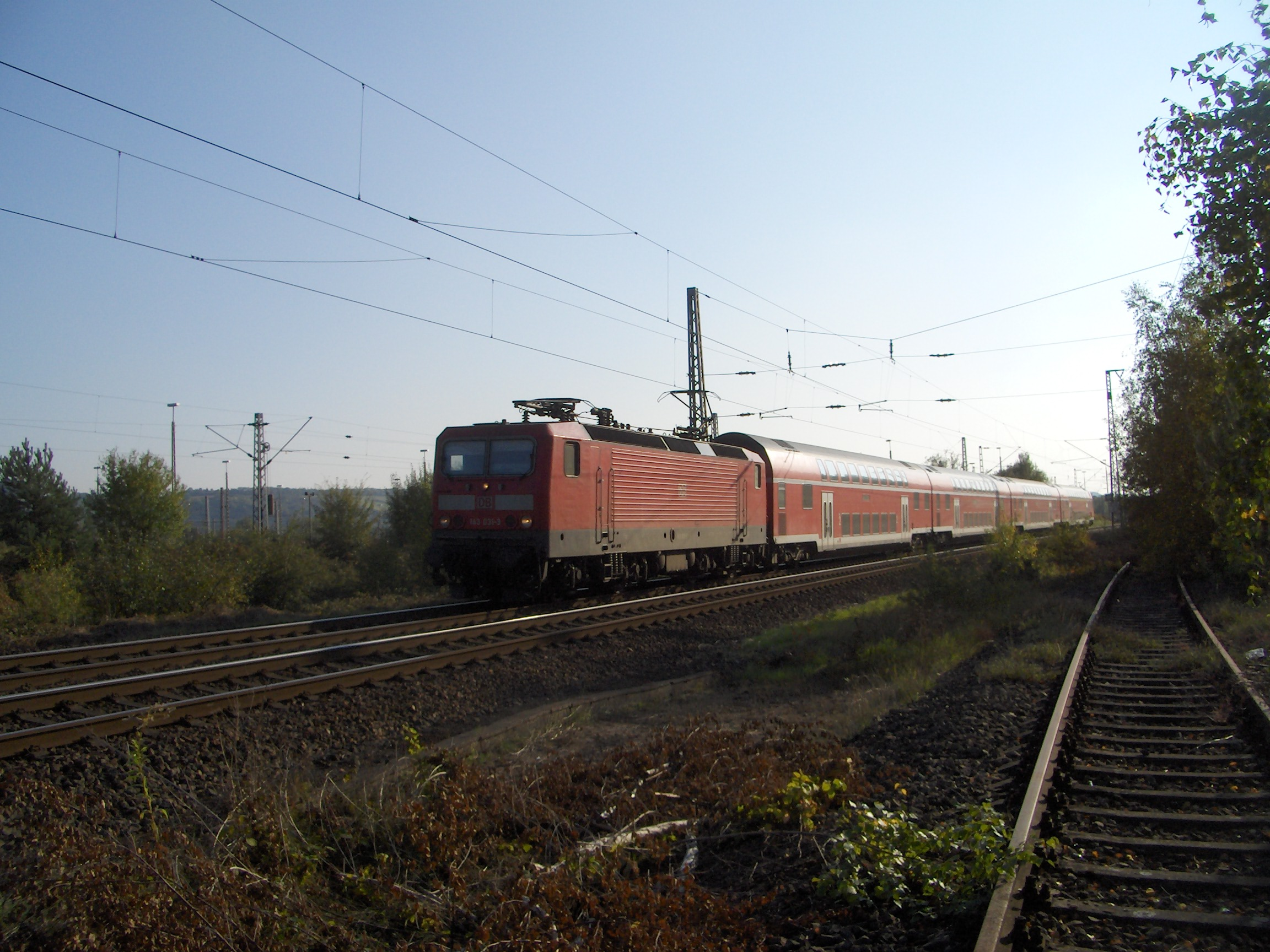
143 031 with an RE service to Koblenz near Trier-Ehrang

Regional transport has a major role on the Moselle line. Hourly express trains were introduced between Koblenz and Saarbrücken when the national regular interval timetable was established in 1985. This was followed in 1991 with the introduction of an hourly local service. In the summer of 2000 a service, known as the Moselle S-Bahn, was introduced between Wittlich and Trier, operating for part of the day at approximately 30-minute intervals.

Line	Route	Frequency
RE 1	Koblenz – Cochem (Mosel) – Bullay – Wittlich – Trier – Merzig (Saar) – Saarbrücken – Homburg (Saar) – Kaiserslautern – Neustadt (Weinstraße) – Mannheim	60 min (Koblenz–Kaiserslautern); 120 min (Kaiserslautern–Mannheim)
RE 11	Koblenz – Cochem (Mosel) – Bullay – Wittlich – Trier – Wasserbillig – Luxemburg	60 min
RB 81	Koblenz – Cochem (Mosel) – Bullay – Wittlich – Trier	60 min
RB 82	Wittlich – Trier – Wehr (Mosel) – Perl	60 min

The two Regionalbahn services use class 425 and 426 multiple units.

The Regional-Express trains between Koblenz and Mannheim are mostly composed of vehicles of class 429. These services run once an hour in each direction.

After the timetable change 2010/2011 on 12 December 2010, a Regional-Express service ran twice daily on the Luxembourg–Trier–Wittlich route. This service was operated by the CFL (the Luxembourg state railway company) with bi-level cars.

In July 2011, the Zweckverband SPNV-Nord transport authority announced that DB Regio West had won the tender for the local network called "RE Südwest E-Traktion". From December 2014 to December 2029, an hourly service (RE 1) is being operated on the Koblenz–Kaiserslautern route, continuing every two hours to Mannheim. Trains arrive/depart from Koblenz on the hour and arrive/depart Mannheim at 30 minute past the hour. Since 14 December 2014, RE 1 services have been operate with multiple units of DB class 429.1.

CFL was expected to provide from December 2014 an hourly connection between Trier and Luxembourg (RE 11) with Stadler KISS multiple units, connecting in Trier with the services to/from Koblenz. Due to work required for technical adaptation, this connection was not introduced until March 2015.

=== Freight ===
This railway line holds a major flow of heavy iron ore trains from the North Sea ports to the Dillinger Hütte steelworks in the Saarland.
