= Pünderich–Traben-Trarbach railway =

Railway line in Germany

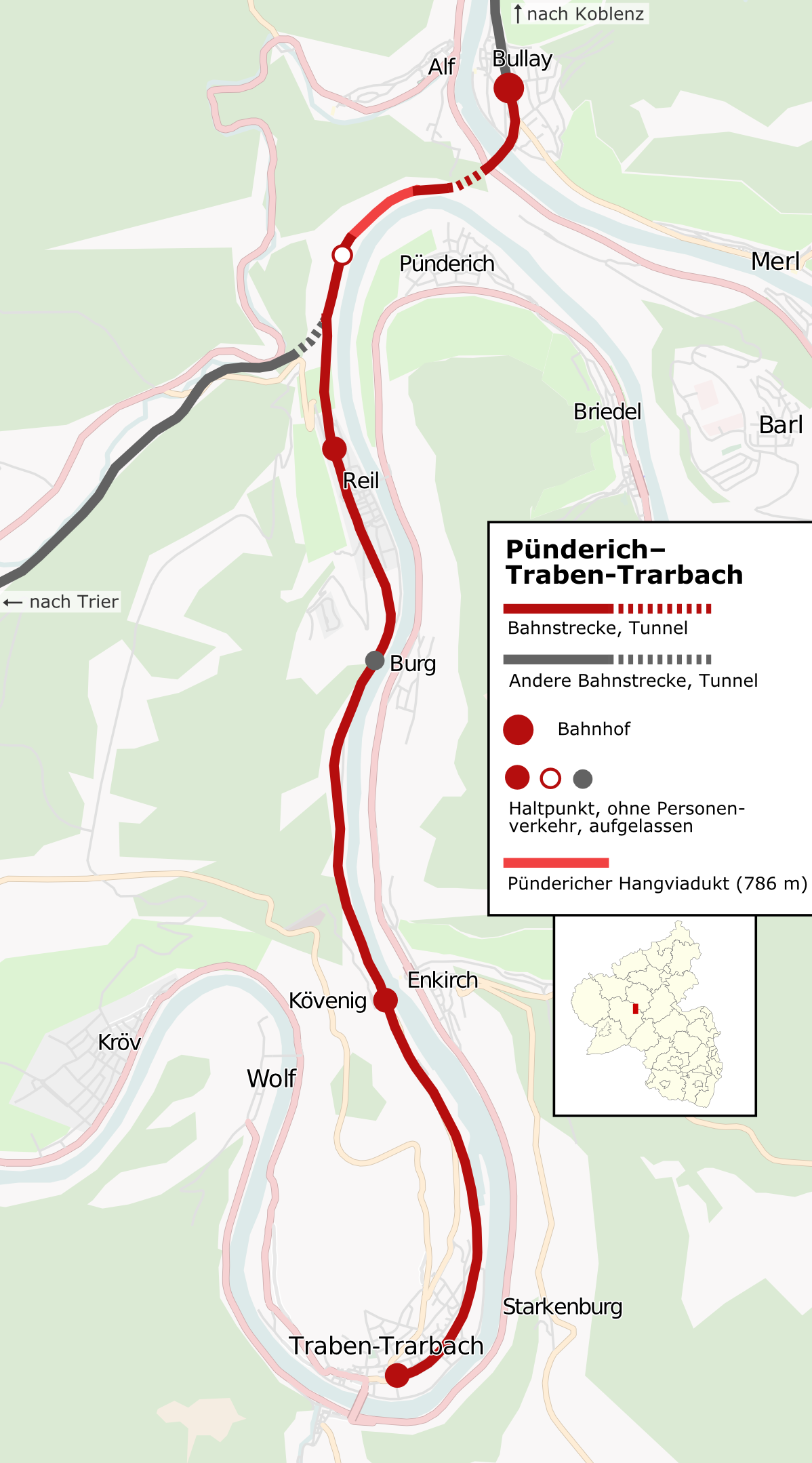
- Map of the Pünderich–Traben-Trarbach line

Overview
- Line number: 3112
- Locale: Rhineland-Palatinate, Germany

Service
- Route number: 691

Technical
- Line length: 10.4 km (6.5 mi)
- Track gauge: 1,435 mm (4 ft 8 1/2 in) standard gauge

The Pünderich-Traben-Trarbach line is a branch line in the German state of Rhineland-Palatinate in the valley of the Moselle, which connects the winegrowing town of Traben-Trarbach to Bullay (DB) station to the Koblenz–Trier railway (German: Moselstrecke, literally "Moselle stretch").

It is served by a service known as the Moselweinbahn (“Mosel wine line”), designated as regional rail line 94. The name has no historical basis, but is a neologism of Deutsche Bahn.

== Location ==
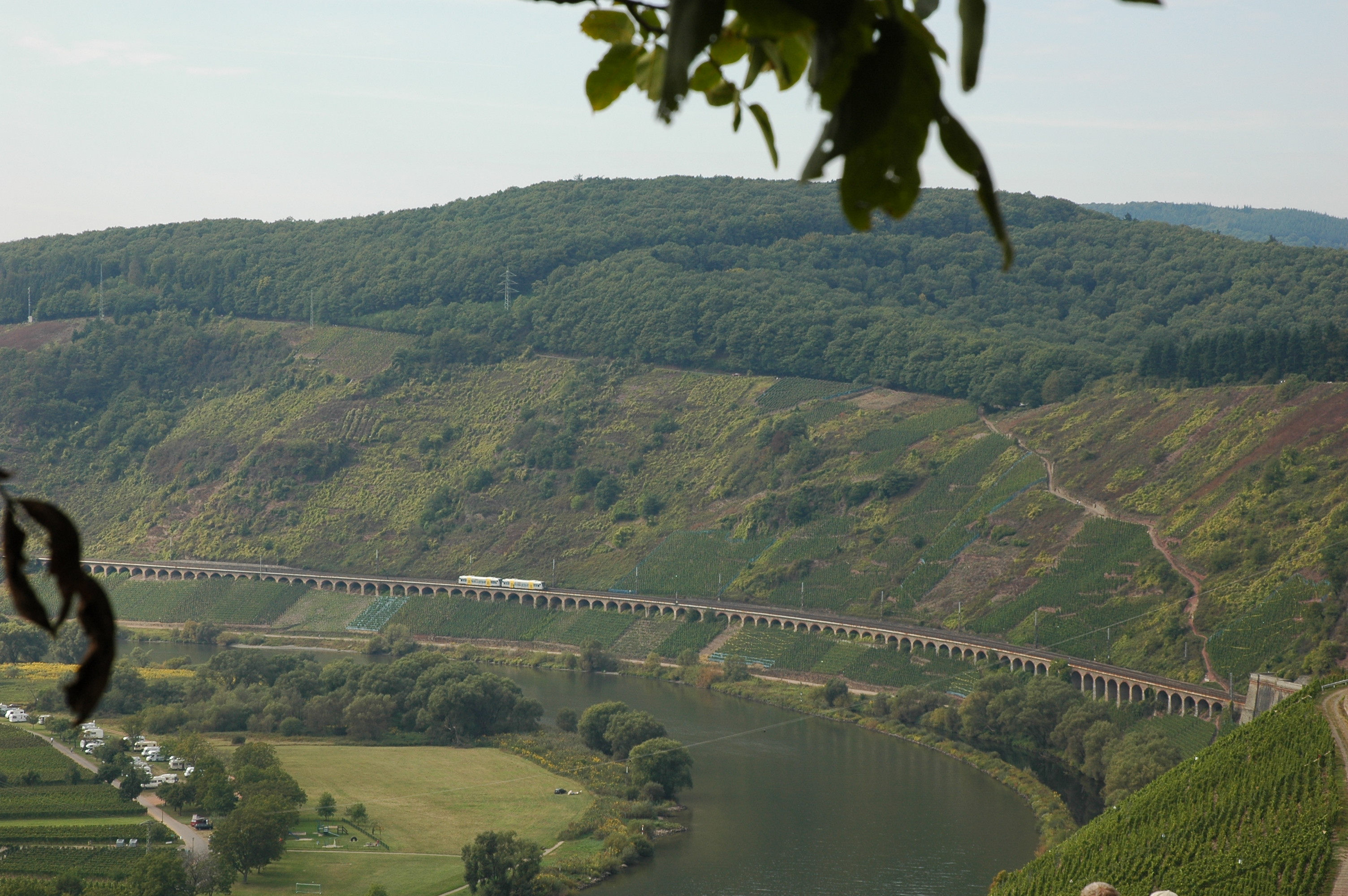
Hangviadukt near Pünderich with trans regio diesel multiple unit.

The 10.5-kilometre-long line is located in Rhineland-Palatinate in the Moselle valley. It connects the tourist town of Traben-Trarbach with the InterCity railway station of Bullay and runs for its entire length in the river valley. Trains on the line leave Bullay station at first running on the Koblenz–Trier line, running over the Alf-Bullay double-deck bridge and then through the Prinzenkopf Tunnel. After the tunnel the lines runs over the 786 metre-long Pünderich Hangviadukt (a viaduct built on a slope with its supports much longer on the downhill side), the longest in Germany.

The branch line starts at Pünderich station, which never had significant passenger traffic due to its very remote location and has been long closed for passengers. The branch line is single track and not electrified.

After 1.5 km the line reaches Reil station. At the 6.8 km point is Kövenig station, where in the summer months, a passenger ferry runs to Enkirch on the opposite bank.

The old terminus at Traben-Trarbach was at the former end of the track at 10.6 km from Pünderich. This station has been replaced by a new station a couple of hundred metres short of it. The site of the former station is now a bus station.

== History ==
Following the opening of the Koblenz–Trier railway was in 1879, all of the Moselle valley south of Bullay, where the line leaves the valley, still had no direct rail connection. A branch line was considered to connect Traben and Trarbach—which were still separate communities—to the main line. In 1880, a concession was grant to build the line, which was opened on 21 March 1883.

In the 1980s the line had declining numbers of passengers and was considered for closure. At that time, it was operated almost entirely with obsolete railcars of class 795 and 798.

The downward trend was only stopped with the introduction of an hourly service and the use of new vehicles—diesel multiple unit of class VT 628.2 and 628.4, and temporarily double-decker rail cars of the class 670.0. Passenger numbers then increased significantly.

The terminal station in Traben-Trarbach with its many freight tracks was closed many years ago, after the rationalisation of freight transport, and replaced by a new station two hundred metres to the north. In its place there is now a large bus station and a shopping centre.

== Current situation ==
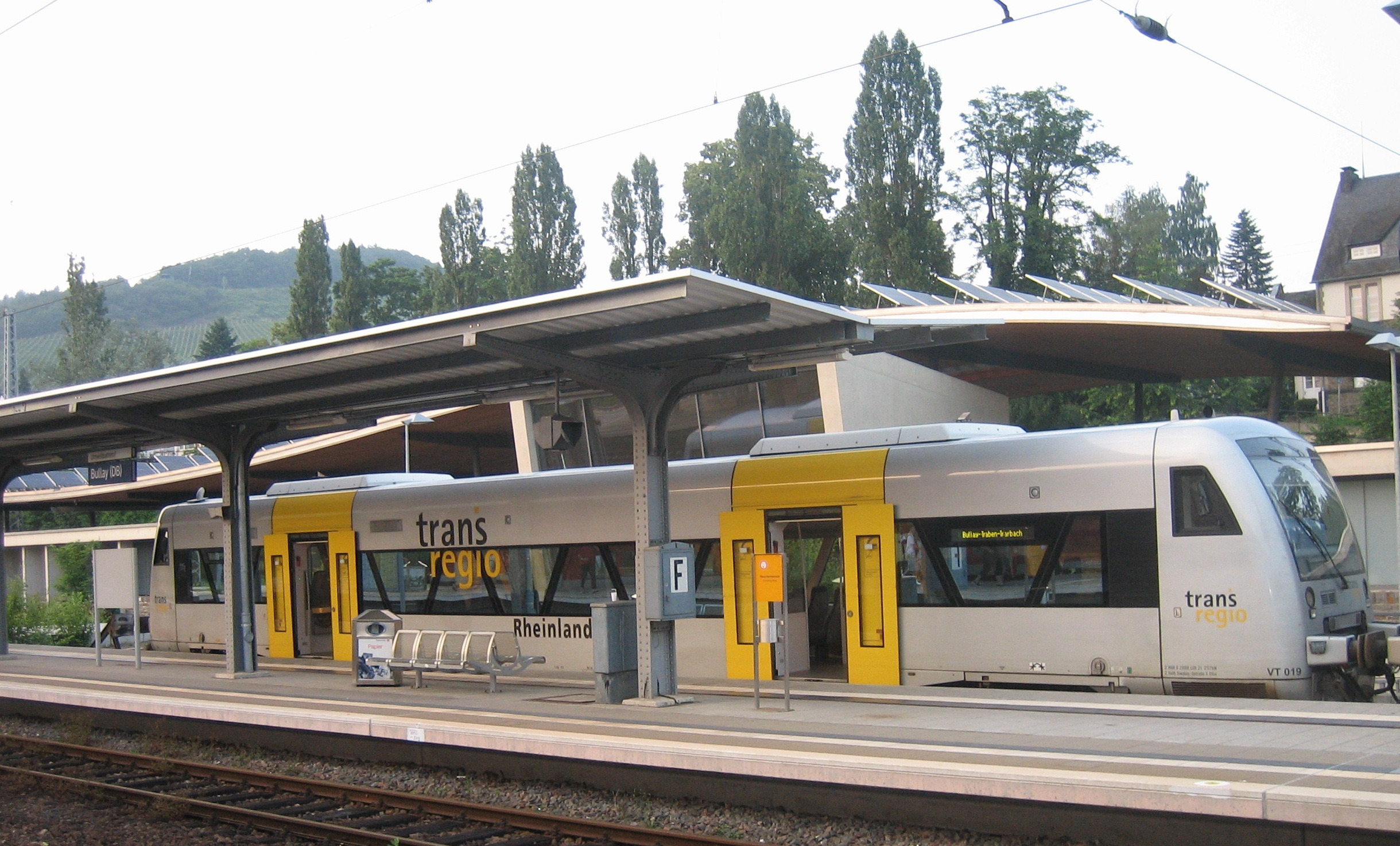
Regionalbahn service of trans regio to Traben-Trarbach in Bullay station

Most of the passengers of the line are now tourists, hikers and cyclists. The carriage of commuters and students play a minor role. The line is now served by Regionalbahn service RB 94 at hourly intervals operated by Rhenus Veniro with Stadler Regio-Shuttle RS1 rail cars.

Freight traffic was never of great importance and it was closed many years ago. It consisted mainly of general freight, wine (in tank cars) and agricultural products and supplies to and from the depot of the Raiffeisen cooperative.

== Future ==
It was planned to electrify the line and to create a continuous Regional-Express connection to Koblenz from 2015. The plans were later scrapped.

== Fares ==
Transport association Verkehrsverbund Region Trier

Transport association Verkehrsverbund Rhein-Mosel

The section from Reil to Traben-Trarbach is located in the area of the transport association Verkehrsverbund Region Trier (VRT) and in the transitional fare zone number 175 of the transport association Verkehrsverbund Rhein-Mosel (VRM), Bullay station is located in the VRM area.
