= Matthias Joseph Mehs =

German politician (1893–1976)

Member of the Bundestag
- In office 7 September 1949 – 7 September 1953

Personal details
- Born: 12 October 1893
- Died: 7 April 1976 (aged 82)
- Party: CDU

Matthias Joseph Mehs (October 12, 1893 – April 7, 1976) was a German politician of the Christian Democratic Union (CDU) and former member of the German Bundestag.

== Life ==
In 1945 Mehs founded the CDU in the town and district of Wittlich, and from 1946 to 1953 he was honorary mayor of the town and member of the district council. From 1953 to 1957, he was an alderman of the town of Wittlich.

Mehs was a member of the German Bundestag in its first legislative period. He represented the constituency of Bitburg in parliament.

== Literature ==
Herbst, Ludolf; Jahn, Bruno (2002). Vierhaus, Rudolf (ed.). Biographisches Handbuch der Mitglieder des Deutschen Bundestages. 1949–2002 [Biographical Handbook of the Members of the German Bundestag. 1949–2002] (in German). München: De Gruyter - De Gruyter Saur. p. 1715. ISBN 978-3-11-184511-1.
