= Reil, Germany =

Reil
- Municipality
- Coat of arms

- Location of Reil within Bernkastel-Wittlich district
- Interactive map of Reil
- Location within Germany Location within Rhineland-Palatinate
- Coordinates: 50°1′19″N 7°6′56″E
- Country: Germany
- State: Rhineland-Palatinate
- District: Bernkastel-Wittlich
- Municipal assoc.: Traben-Trarbach

Government
  - Mayor (2019–24): Elke Schnabel (CDU)

Area
  - Total: 12.13 km^{2} (4.68 sq mi)
- Elevation: 110 m (360 ft)

Population (2025-12-31)
  - Total: 966
  - Density: 79.6/km^{2} (206/sq mi)
- Time zone: UTC+01:00 (CET)
  - Summer (DST): UTC+02:00 (CEST)
- Postal codes: 56861
- Dialling codes: 06542
- Vehicle registration: WIL
- Website: www.reil-mosel.de

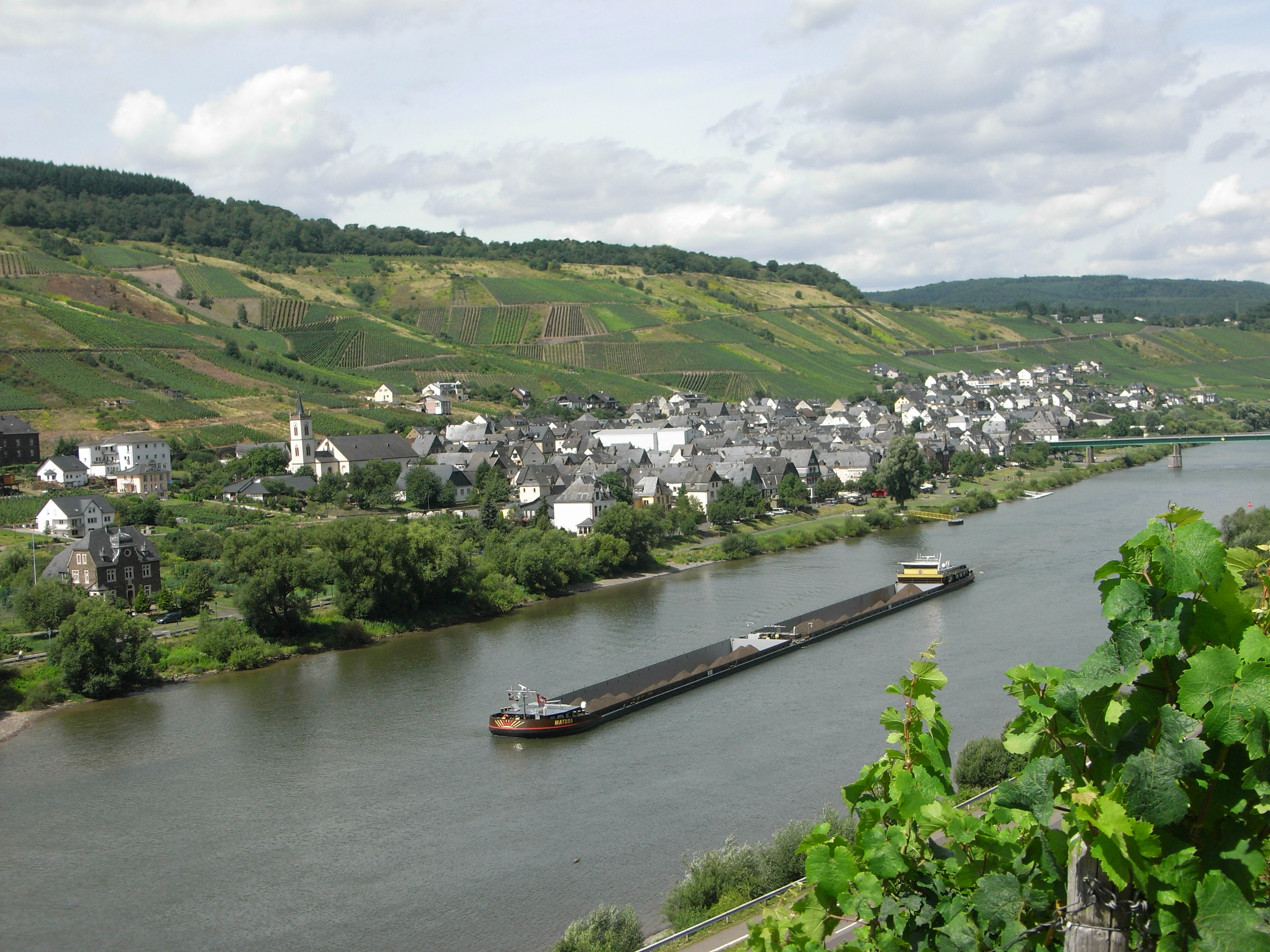
Reil, seen from the south

Reil (German pronunciation: [ʁaɪl]) is an Ortsgemeinde – a municipality belonging to a Verbandsgemeinde, a kind of collective municipality – in the Bernkastel-Wittlich district in Rhineland-Palatinate, Germany. Reil is strongly characterized by winegrowing and tourism. It was the second capital of the Kröver Reich, a Carolingian crown estate that existed until the French Revolution.

== Geography ==
The municipality lies on the Moselle. It belongs to the Verbandsgemeinde of Traben-Trarbach.

== History ==
In 1008, Reil had its first documentary mention. The document in question, from King Heinrich II, is dated 18 May 1008 and documents an exchange agreement under which Archbishop Willigis of Mainz traded to Saint Stephen's Church at Mainz an estate in Reil (then known as Rigula) for another estate in Büchenbach (then known as Buochinbah). During the Middle Ages, an important pilgrimage centre, called Reilkirch, stood across the Moselle from Reil, whose Romanesque tower and Early Gothic nave were completely demolished in the 19th century.

Since Reil was also known in the Middle Ages as Rile or Ryle, it is often claimed that Cologne Cathedral’s first master builder, Gerhard von Rile, came from the village. A noble family from which “Meister Gerhard” could have come, however, is first named in documents only in 1285, roughly fourteen years after Gerhard's death. Its last representative, David von Reil, died penniless in 1610.

Beginning in 1794, Reil lay under French rule. In 1814 it was assigned to the Kingdom of Prussia at the Congress of Vienna. Since 1947, it has been part of the then newly founded state of Rhineland-Palatinate.

== Politics ==
=== Municipal council ===
The municipal council is made up of 16 council members, who were elected by proportional representation at the municipal election held on 7 June 2009, and the honorary mayor as chairman.

The municipal election held on 7 June 2009 yielded the following results:

Year	SPD	CDU	Total
2009	9	7	16 seats
2004	9	7	16 seats

=== Town partnerships ===
Reil fosters partnerships with the following places:

- Zedelgem, West Flanders, Belgium since 2007

== Culture and sightseeing ==
The sport club TuS Reil, with some 550 members, is the biggest club in Reil.

== Economy and infrastructure ==
In the 19th and 20th centuries, Reil, with more than 200 ha of vineyards under cultivation, was one of the biggest winegrowing centres on the Moselle. The vineyards of Goldlay, Falklay, Moullay-Hofberg and Sorentberg belong to the winemaking appellation – Großlage – of Vom Heißen Stein (“From The Hot Stone”) and to the Mosel wine region's Bernkastel area. In years since, the cultivated area has shrunk by almost half to 120 ha. Tourism, especially “enotourism” – wine harvest holidaymaking – is playing an ever more important rôle.

In Reil are one kindergarten and one primary school. Running by on the other side of the Moselle is Bundesstraße 53. In the village itself is a station on the Pünderich–Traben-Trarbach railway, which came into service in 1883.

The line RB85 (Moselweinbahn) runs from Bullay via Reil to Traben-Trarbach. Reil is located in the area of the transport association Verkehrsverbund Region Trier (VRT) and in the transitional fare zone number 175 of the transport association Verkehrsverbund Rhein-Mosel (VRM).
