= Kröv =

- Municipality
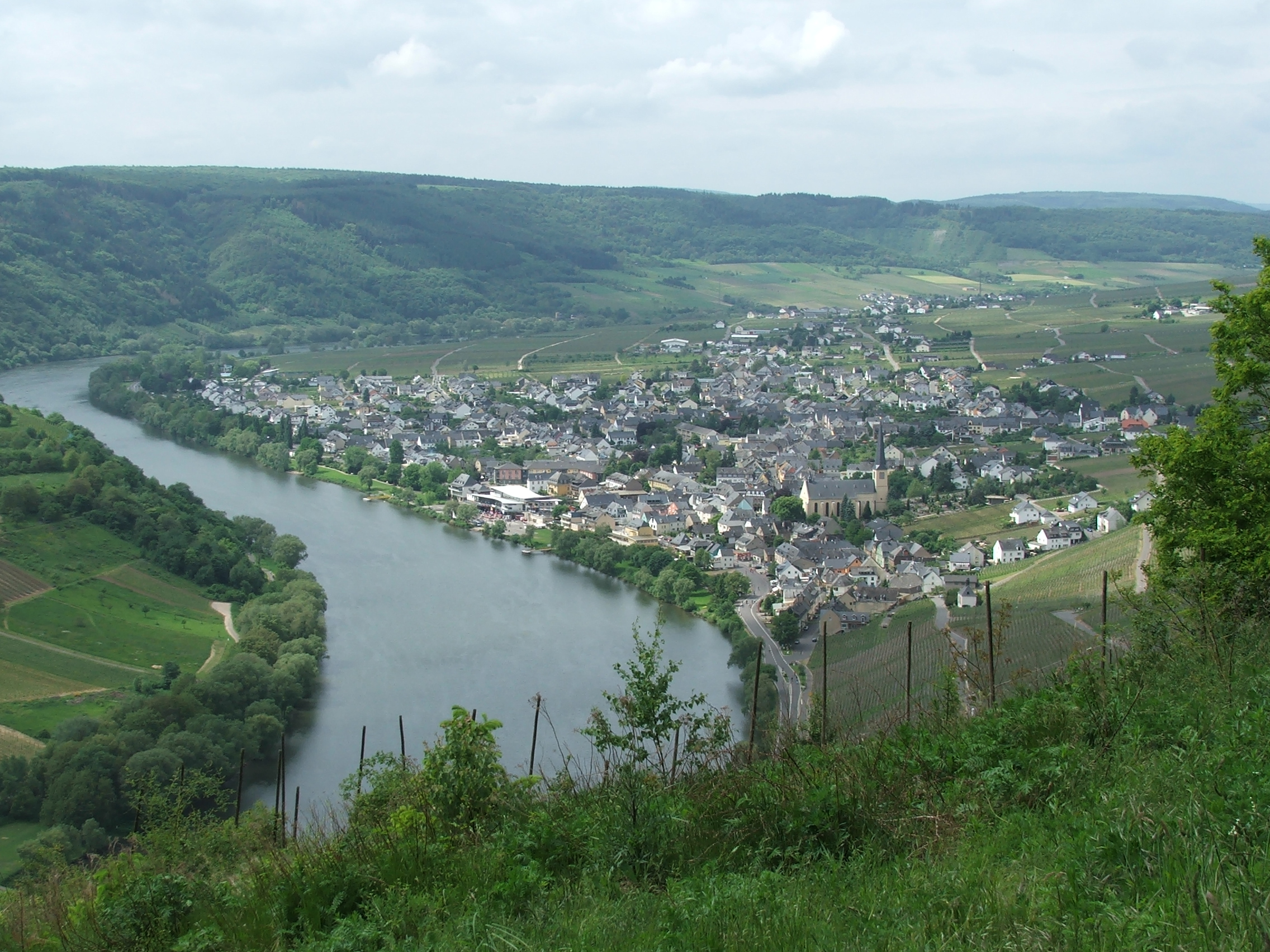
- Panorama of the municipality

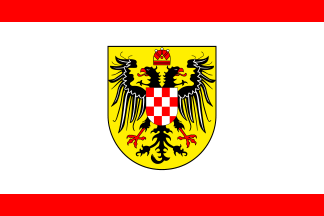
- Flag Coat of arms

- Location of Kröv within Bernkastel-Wittlich district
- Interactive map of Kröv
- Location within Germany Location within Rhineland-Palatinate
- Coordinates: 49°58′39.42″N 7°5′4.43″E
- Country: Germany
- State: Rhineland-Palatinate
- District: Bernkastel-Wittlich
- Municipal assoc.: Traben-Trarbach
- Subdivisions: 2

Government
  - Mayor (2019–24): Thomas Martini

Area
  - Total: 14.75 km^{2} (5.70 sq mi)
- Elevation: 120 m (390 ft)

Population (2025-12-31)
  - Total: 2,118
  - Density: 143.6/km^{2} (371.9/sq mi)
- Time zone: UTC+01:00 (CET)
  - Summer (DST): UTC+02:00 (CEST)
- Postal codes: 54536
- Dialling codes: 06541
- Vehicle registration: WIL
- Website: www.kroev.de

Kröv (German pronunciation: [kʁøːf]) is an Ortsgemeinde – a municipality belonging to a Verbandsgemeinde, a kind of collective municipality – in the Bernkastel-Wittlich district in Rhineland-Palatinate, Germany.

== Geography ==
The municipality lies on the Moselle between the town of Traben-Trarbach and Kinheim. Kröv is made up of the main centre, also called Kröv, and the considerably smaller outlying centre of Kövenig, lying east of the main centre and separated from it by the heights of Mont Royal. Kröv belongs to the Verbandsgemeinde of Traben-Trarbach. Before July 2014, it was the seat of the former Verbandsgemeinde of Kröv-Bausendorf.

== History ==
The placename derives from the original Gallo-Romance croviacum, which later became a Merovingian kingly estate. The municipality's first documentary mention came under the Carolingian king Lothair II in 862. Kröv was part of the Kröver Reich (a royal estate named for Kröv). The village belonged until 1815 to the Département de la Sarre, and after Napoleon's final defeat, to Prussia. Since 1947, it has been part of the then newly founded state of Rhineland-Palatinate.

The Nazi and Hitler Youth leader Baldur von Schirach withdrew to Kröv after his release from prison in 1966, dying and being buried here several years later (1974). Schirach's gravestone at the Kröv graveyard bears the epitaph “Ich war einer von Euch” – “I was one of you”.

On August 6, 2024, a multi-story hotel collapsed in the centre of Kröv, killing two persons. Seven buried persons could be rescued alive. The building had been erected in the 17th century.

== Politics ==
The municipal council is made up of 16 council members, who were elected by proportional representation at the municipal election held on 7 June 2009, and the honorary mayor as chairman.

The municipal election held on 7 June 2009 yielded the following results:

	SPD	CDU	FDP	Kövenig e.V.	Total
2009	2	7	6	1	16 seats
2004	2	8	5	1	16 seats

== Culture and sightseeing ==
- Burggebäude St. Josef (castle building)
- St. Remigius's Parish Church
- Parish estate
- Grabkapelle Kesselstatt (“grave chapel”)
- Dreigiebelhaus (“Three-Gable House”, a former town hall)
- Echternacher Hof (estate)
- Hof der Grauen Schwestern (“Estate of the Grey Sisters”)
- Carolingian estate
- Staffelter Hof (estate that draws its name from Stavelot in the Principality of Stavelot-Malmedy, to which it belonged for centuries and to which it was tributary)

== Economy and infrastructure ==
=== Winegrowing ===
Winegrowing is one of Kröv's more important industries. The vines are grown in the Ortsteile of Kröv and Kövenig on an area of some 350 ha, some of it steep-slope vineyards. The grapes grown here are overwhelmingly Riesling, although in the less steep vineyards, Müller-Thurgau, Kerner and Dornfelder are also raised.

Kröv's vineyards belong to the winemaking appellation – Großlage – of Kröver Nacktarsch.

=== Education ===
In Kröv are one kindergarten and one primary school.

=== Transport ===
Through the municipality runs Bundesstraße 53. In the outlying centre of Kövenig is a halt on the Moselwein-Bahn (railway) on the stretch of the line between Traben-Trarbach and Bullay. Kövenig is located in the area of the transport association Verkehrsverbund Region Trier (VRT) and in the transitional fare zone number 175 of the transport association Verkehrsverbund Rhein-Mosel (VRM).

=== Notable people ===
Baldur von Schirach (1907-1974), who was Reichsjugendführer of Germany 1931-40 and later Gauleiter and Reichsstatthalter of Vienna, and who was a defendant at Nuremberg, died in the town.
