= Traben-Trarbach (Verbandsgemeinde) =

Municipality in Rhineland-Palatinate, Germany

- Verbandsgemeinde
- Location of Traben-Trarbach within Bernkastel-Wittlich district
- Interactive map of Traben-Trarbach
- Location within Germany Location within Rhineland-Palatinate
- Coordinates: 49°57′N 7°07′E
- Country: Germany
- State: Rhineland-Palatinate
- District: Bernkastel-Wittlich
- Seat: Traben-Trarbach
- Subdivisions: 16 municipalities

Area
  - Total: 204.61 km^{2} (79.00 sq mi)

Population (2025-12-31)
  - Total: 16,867
  - Density: 82.435/km^{2} (213.51/sq mi)
- Time zone: UTC+01:00 (CET)
  - Summer (DST): UTC+02:00 (CEST)
- Website: www.vgtt.de

Traben-Trarbach is a Verbandsgemeinde ("collective municipality") in the district Bernkastel-Wittlich, in Rhineland-Palatinate, Germany. Its seat of administration is in Traben-Trarbach. On 1 July 2014 it was expanded with the municipalities of the former Verbandsgemeinde Kröv-Bausendorf.

The Verbandsgemeinde Traben-Trarbach consists of the following Ortsgemeinden ("local municipalities"):

1. Bausendorf
2. Bengel
3. Burg
4. Diefenbach
5. Enkirch
6. Flußbach
7. Hontheim
8. Irmenach
9. Kinderbeuern
10. Kinheim
11. Kröv
12. Lötzbeuren
13. Reil
14. Starkenburg
15. Traben-Trarbach
16. Willwerscheid
