= Diefenbach =

- Municipality
- Coat of arms

- Location of Diefenbach within Bernkastel-Wittlich district
- Interactive map of Diefenbach
- Location within Germany Location within Rhineland-Palatinate
- Coordinates: 50°01′56″N 06°56′43″E
- Country: Germany
- State: Rhineland-Palatinate
- District: Bernkastel-Wittlich
- Municipal assoc.: Traben-Trarbach

Government
  - Mayor (2019–24): Manfred Condne

Area
  - Total: 1.42 km^{2} (0.55 sq mi)
- Elevation: 270 m (890 ft)

Population (2025-12-31)
  - Total: 92
  - Density: 65/km^{2} (170/sq mi)
- Time zone: UTC+01:00 (CET)
  - Summer (DST): UTC+02:00 (CEST)
- Postal codes: 54538
- Dialling codes: 06574
- Vehicle registration: WIL

Diefenbach (German pronunciation: [ˈdiːfn̩bax]) is an Ortsgemeinde – a municipality belonging to a Verbandsgemeinde, a kind of collective municipality – in the Bernkastel-Wittlich district in Rhineland-Palatinate, Germany.

== Geography ==
The municipality lies at the edge of the Eifel on the river Demichbach in a side valley of the river Alf. The municipal area is 63% wooded. The nearest middle centre is Wittlich to the south. Diefenbach belongs to the Verbandsgemeinde of Traben-Trarbach.

== History ==
Beginning in 1794, Diefenbach lay under French rule. In 1814 it was assigned to the Kingdom of Prussia at the Congress of Vienna. Since 1947, it has been part of the then newly founded state of Rhineland-Palatinate.

== Politics ==
The municipal council is made up of 6 council members, who were elected by majority vote at the municipal election held on 7 June 2009, and the honorary mayor as chairman.

== Economy and infrastructure ==
To the west runs the Autobahn A 1. In Ürzig is a railway station on the Moselstrecke (Moselle Line).
