= Willwerscheid =

- Municipality
- Coat of arms

- Location of Willwerscheid within Bernkastel-Wittlich district
- Interactive map of Willwerscheid
- Location within Germany Location within Rhineland-Palatinate
- Coordinates: 50°02′10″N 06°55′48″E
- Country: Germany
- State: Rhineland-Palatinate
- District: Bernkastel-Wittlich
- Municipal assoc.: Traben-Trarbach

Government
  - Mayor: Günther Thörnich

Area
  - Total: 2.46 km^{2} (0.95 sq mi)
- Elevation: 440 m (1,440 ft)

Population (2025-12-31)
  - Total: 59
  - Density: 24/km^{2} (62/sq mi)
- Time zone: UTC+01:00 (CET)
  - Summer (DST): UTC+02:00 (CEST)
- Postal codes: 54533
- Dialling codes: 06574
- Vehicle registration: WIL
- Website: http://www.ortsgemeinde-willwerscheid.de/

Willwerscheid is an Ortsgemeinde – a municipality belonging to a Verbandsgemeinde, a kind of collective municipality – in the Bernkastel-Wittlich district in Rhineland-Palatinate, Germany.

== Geography ==
The municipality belongs to the Trier Region and lies about 8 km northeast of Wittlich in the Vulkaneifel. The municipal area is 62% wooded. Willwerscheid belongs to the Verbandsgemeinde of Traben-Trarbach.

== History ==
Beginning in 1794, Willwerscheid lay under French rule. In 1814 it was assigned to the Kingdom of Prussia at the Congress of Vienna. Since 1947, it has been part of the then newly founded state of Rhineland-Palatinate.

== Politics ==
The municipal council is made up of 6 members, elected by majority vote at municipal elections, and the honorary mayor as chairman.

== Economy and infrastructure ==
Southwest of the municipality runs the Autobahn A 1. There is an interchange in nearby Hasborn. In Wittlich is a railway station on the Koblenz-Trier railway line.
