= Hontheim =

- Municipality
- Coat of arms

- Location of Hontheim within Bernkastel-Wittlich district
- Interactive map of Hontheim
- Location within Germany Location within Rhineland-Palatinate
- Coordinates: 50°4′7.21″N 6°59′30.81″E
- Country: Germany
- State: Rhineland-Palatinate
- District: Bernkastel-Wittlich
- Municipal assoc.: Traben-Trarbach
- Subdivisions: 4

Government
  - Mayor (2019–24): Ilona Lauxen

Area
  - Total: 24.77 km^{2} (9.56 sq mi)
- Elevation: 385 m (1,263 ft)

Population (2025-12-31)
  - Total: 821
  - Density: 33.1/km^{2} (85.8/sq mi)
- Time zone: UTC+01:00 (CET)
  - Summer (DST): UTC+02:00 (CEST)
- Postal codes: 54538
- Dialling codes: 02674
- Vehicle registration: WIL

Hontheim is an Ortsgemeinde – a municipality belonging to a Verbandsgemeinde, a kind of collective municipality – in the Bernkastel-Wittlich district in Rhineland-Palatinate, Germany.

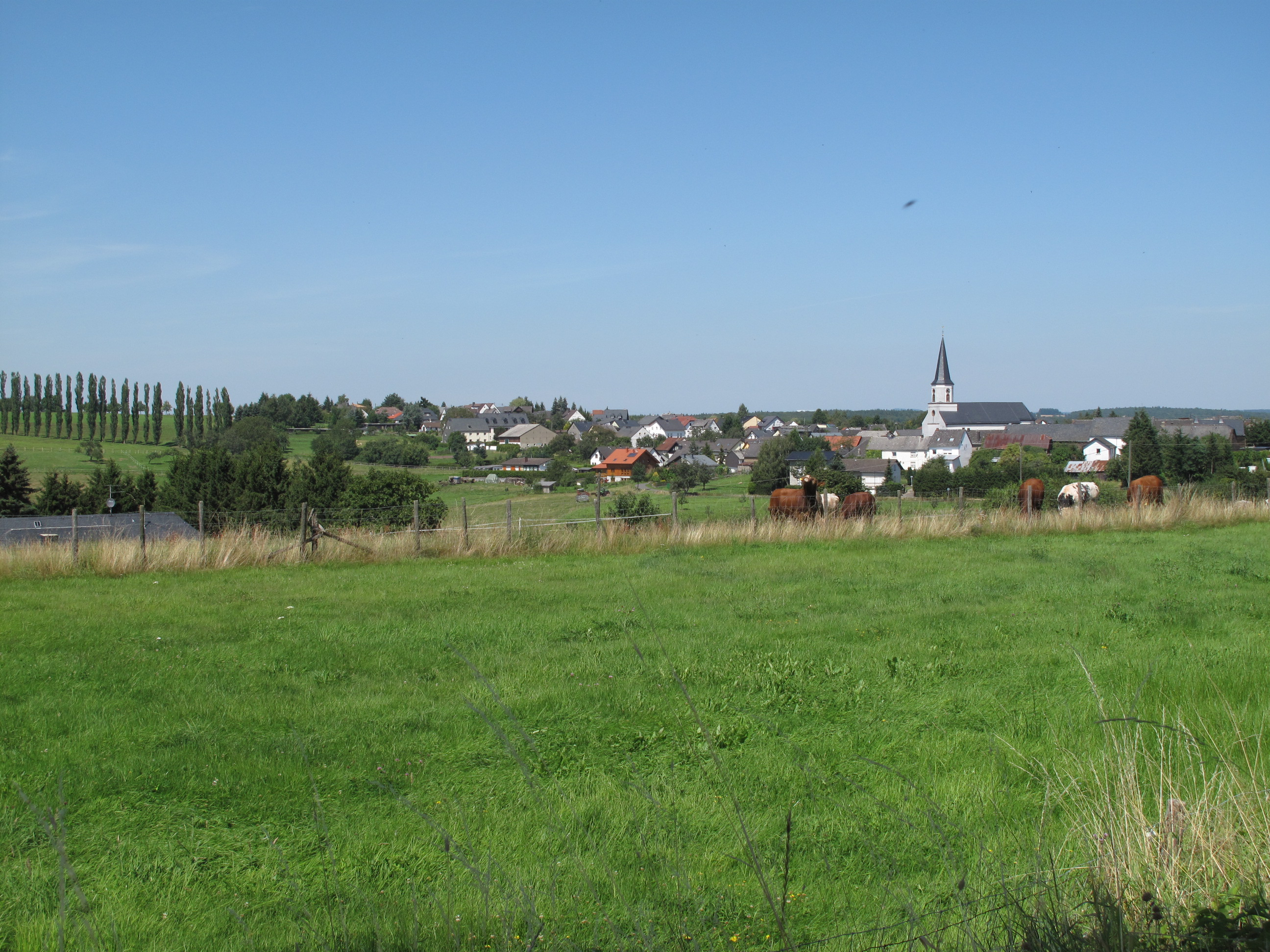
Hontheim

== Geography ==
=== Location ===
The municipality lies on a plateau in the southern Volcanic Eifel at the northern edge of the Kondelwald forest. The municipal area is 58.4% wooded. Hontheim belongs to the Verbandsgemeinde of Traben-Trarbach.

=== Constituent communities ===
Hontheim's Ortsteile, besides the main centre, are Wispelt, Krinkhof and Bonsbeuern.

== History ==
Beginning in 1794, Hontheim lay under French rule. In 1814 it was assigned to the Kingdom of Prussia at the Congress of Vienna. Since 1947, it has been part of the then newly founded state of Rhineland-Palatinate.

== Politics ==
=== Municipal council ===
The council is made up of 12 council members, who were elected by proportional representation at the municipal election held on 7 June 2009, and the honorary mayor as chairwoman.

The municipal election held on 7 June 2009 yielded the following results:

Year	Steffens	Götten	Komes	Gellner	Total
2009	7	2	2	1	12 seats

=== Coat of arms ===
The municipality's arms might be described thus: Per fess Or a cross gules and gules a hound courant of the first.

== Economy and infrastructure ==
Through the municipality runs Bundesstraße 421. To the west runs the Autobahn A 1. In Ürzig is a railway station on the Koblenz-Trier railway line. The state spa town of Bad Bertrich, with Germany's only Glauber's salt (sodium sulphate decahydrate; Na_{2}SO_{4}•10H_{2}O) hot spring, is only 3 km away.
