= Flußbach =

- Municipality
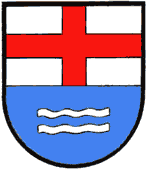
- Coat of arms

- Location of Flußbach within Bernkastel-Wittlich district
- Interactive map of Flußbach
- Location within Germany Location within Rhineland-Palatinate
- Coordinates: 50°01′01″N 6°55′34″E
- Country: Germany
- State: Rhineland-Palatinate
- District: Bernkastel-Wittlich
- Municipal assoc.: Traben-Trarbach

Government
  - Mayor (2019–24): Hans-Josef Drees

Area
  - Total: 6.86 km^{2} (2.65 sq mi)
- Elevation: 225 m (738 ft)

Population (2025-12-31)
  - Total: 434
  - Density: 63.3/km^{2} (164/sq mi)
- Time zone: UTC+01:00 (CET)
  - Summer (DST): UTC+02:00 (CEST)
- Postal codes: 54516
- Dialling codes: 06571
- Vehicle registration: WIL
- Website: www.flussbach.de

Flußbach is an Ortsgemeinde – a municipality belonging to a Verbandsgemeinde, a kind of collective municipality – in the Bernkastel-Wittlich district in Rhineland-Palatinate, Germany.

== Geography ==
Flußbach is found in the outermost Southern Eifel, nestled in a side valley in the outlying hills of the Wittlich Depression. The municipal area is covered by 57% woods. The nearest middle centre is Wittlich to the south. Flußbach belongs to the Verbandsgemeinde of Traben-Trarbach.

== History ==
Flußbach was part of the Electorate of Trier. Beginning in 1794, Flußbach lay under French rule. In 1814 it was assigned to the Kingdom of Prussia at the Congress of Vienna. Since 1947, it has been part of the then newly founded state of Rhineland-Palatinate.

== Politics ==
=== Municipal council ===
The council is made up of 8 council members, who were elected by proportional representation at the municipal election held on 7 June 2009, and the honorary mayor as chairman.

The municipal election held on 7 June 2009 yielded the following results:

Year	WG Sausen	Bürgerliste	Total
2009	3	5	8 seats

=== Coat of arms ===
The municipality's arms might be described thus: Per fess argent a cross gules and azure a bar-gemel couped wavy of the first.

== Economy and infrastructure ==
To the east of the municipal area runs the Autobahn A 1 on which nearest interchange is Hasborn about 3 km away. A railway station is to be found in Wittlich on the Moselstrecke (line along the Moselle). Also worth noting is the village square in the village centre.
