= Bullay =

- Municipality
- Coat of arms

- Location of Bullay within Cochem-Zell district
- Interactive map of Bullay
- Location within Germany Location within Rhineland-Palatinate
- Coordinates: 50°3′18″N 7°8′07″E
- Country: Germany
- State: Rhineland-Palatinate
- District: Cochem-Zell
- Municipal assoc.: Zell (Mosel)

Government
  - Mayor (2019–24): Matthias Müller (FW)

Area
  - Total: 3.96 km^{2} (1.53 sq mi)
- Elevation: 250 m (820 ft)

Population (2025-12-31)
  - Total: 1,712
  - Density: 432/km^{2} (1,120/sq mi)
- Time zone: UTC+01:00 (CET)
  - Summer (DST): UTC+02:00 (CEST)
- Postal codes: 56859
- Dialling codes: 06542
- Vehicle registration: COC
- Website: bullay.de

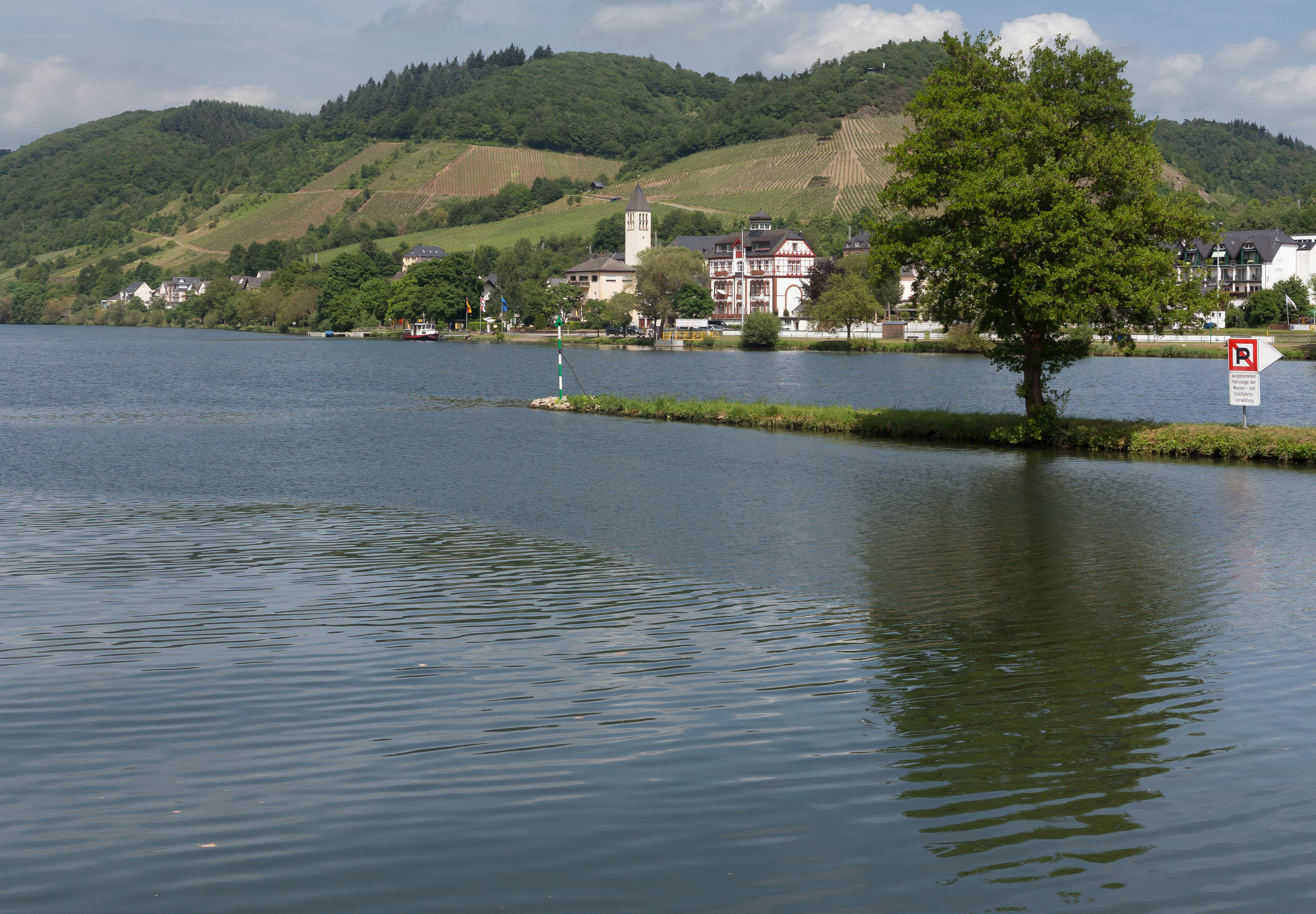
Bullay, catholic church (Pfarrkirche Sankt Maria Magdalena) in the village

Bullay is an Ortsgemeinde – a municipality belonging to a Verbandsgemeinde, a kind of collective municipality – in the Cochem-Zell district in Rhineland-Palatinate, Germany. It belongs to the Verbandsgemeinde of Zell, whose seat is in the municipality of Zell an der Mosel.

== Geography ==
The municipality lies on the river Moselle across from Alf.

== History ==
It is said to be certain that there was a Roman settlement within the limits of what is now Bullay, which had its first documentary mention as Buley infra Cell in 1150. From 1470 to 1550 there was mining in Bullay. Four baronial noble families held the lordship in the village: Zand von Merl, Boos von Waldeck, von Metzenhausen and von Kellenbach (later von Ladenberg). Beginning in 1794, Bullay lay under French rule. In 1815 it was assigned to the Kingdom of Prussia at the Congress of Vienna. In 1879, the Koblenz–Trier line was opened. Since 1946, it has been part of the then newly founded state of Rhineland-Palatinate. Under the Verwaltungsvereinfachungsgesetz (“Administration Simplification Law”) of 18 July 1970, with effect from 7 November 1970, the municipality was grouped into the Verbandsgemeinde of Zell. In 1993 came the highest ever floods in the region, the “Christmas Flood” (Weihnachtshochwasser), also known as the “Flood of the Century” (Jahrhunderthochwasser).

== Politics ==
=== Municipal council ===
The council is made up of 16 council members, who were elected by proportional representation at the municipal election held on 7 June 2009, and the honorary mayor as chairman.

The municipal election held on 7 June 2009 yielded the following results:

Year	SPD	CDU	FWG	Total
2009	2	6	8	16 seats
2004	2	7	7	16 seats

=== Mayor ===
Bullay’s mayor is Matthias Müller, and his deputies are Willi Schumacher, Oswald Menten and Thomas Scheidt.

=== Coat of arms ===
The municipality’s arms might be described thus: Quarterly, first sable a cramp bendwise argent, second argent a cross engrailed gules surmounted in chief by a label of three points of the first, third argent a lion rampant of the third, and fourth sable three annulets of the second.

== Culture and sightseeing ==
=== Buildings ===
The following are listed buildings or sites in Rhineland-Palatinate’s Directory of Cultural Monuments:

- Saint Mary Magdalene’s Catholic Parish Church (Pfarrkirche St. Maria Magdalena), Kirchstraße (monumental zone) – Gothic Revival aisleless church, 1871–73, expansion in 1936; separate tower from 1952/53, altered in 1932
- Alte Poststraße – Mary Magdalene chapel; open plastered building from 1657
- Bahnhofsplatz – Bullay railway station; many-winged Late Historicist quarrystone railway station building, partly plastered, about 1905; whole complex with platforms
- Bergstraße 20 – stately villa, partly sided with wood, 1920s
- Brautrockstraße 40 – Renaissance Revival quarrystone building, about 1900
- Eisenbahnbrücke – double-deck bridge, 1875–78, renovated in 1928–29, in 1945 partly destroyed, subsequently repaired
- Im Tal – Wayside chapel; brick façade, about 1900
- Lindenplatz 4 – Baroque scalloped niche relief
- Zehnthausstraße 8 – former tithe house (?); three-floor timber-frame house, partly solid, hipped mansard roof, from 1593, possibly remodelled in the 18th century
- Zehnthausstraße 14 – three-floor timber-frame house, partly solid, half-hipped roof, early 17th century
- Zehnthausstraße 16 – timber-frame house, partly solid, 17th century
- Zehnthausstraße 32 – three-floor timber-frame house, partly solid, plastered, 16th century
- Zehnthausstraße 34 – timber-frame house, partly solid, 17th century
- Zehnthausstraße 36 – timber-frame house, partly solid and slated, 18th or 19th century
- Jewish graveyard – 44 gravestones
- northeast of the village – warriors’ memorial cross; cast iron, 19th century
- Yeşil Camii - the only mosque in the district of Cochem-Zell

The double-deck bridge mentioned above is the Alf-Bullay bridge, which carries a roadway across the Moselle on the lower deck, and the Moselbahn – the Koblenz-Trier railway line – on the upper deck.

Bullay also has an “Environmental Railway Station” that has been awarded an architectural prize by the state of Rhineland-Palatinate.

=== Religion ===
Although in a mainly Catholic area, Bullay has a mosque named Yeşil Camii. All five daily prayers have been offered since March 14, 2014. The mosque's association is linked to the DITIB, but welcomes Muslims from all countries to join the prayers.

=== Gallery ===
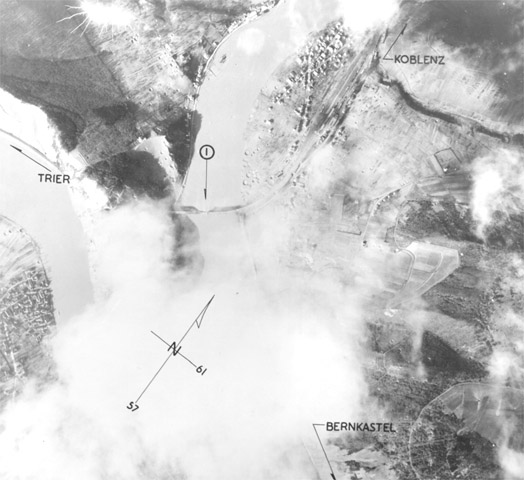
Aerial view of Bullay from 1945

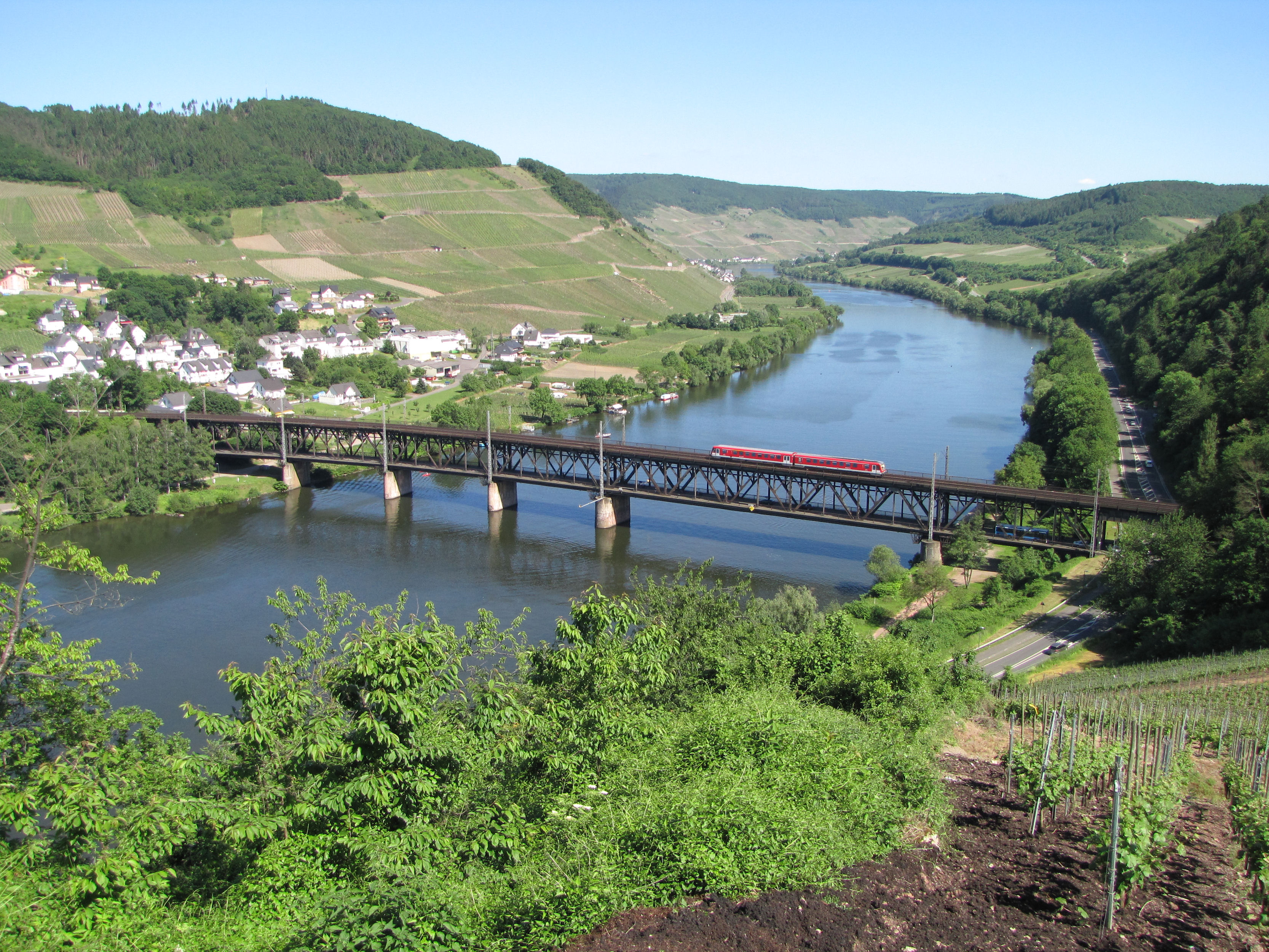
Alf-Bullay double-deck bridge

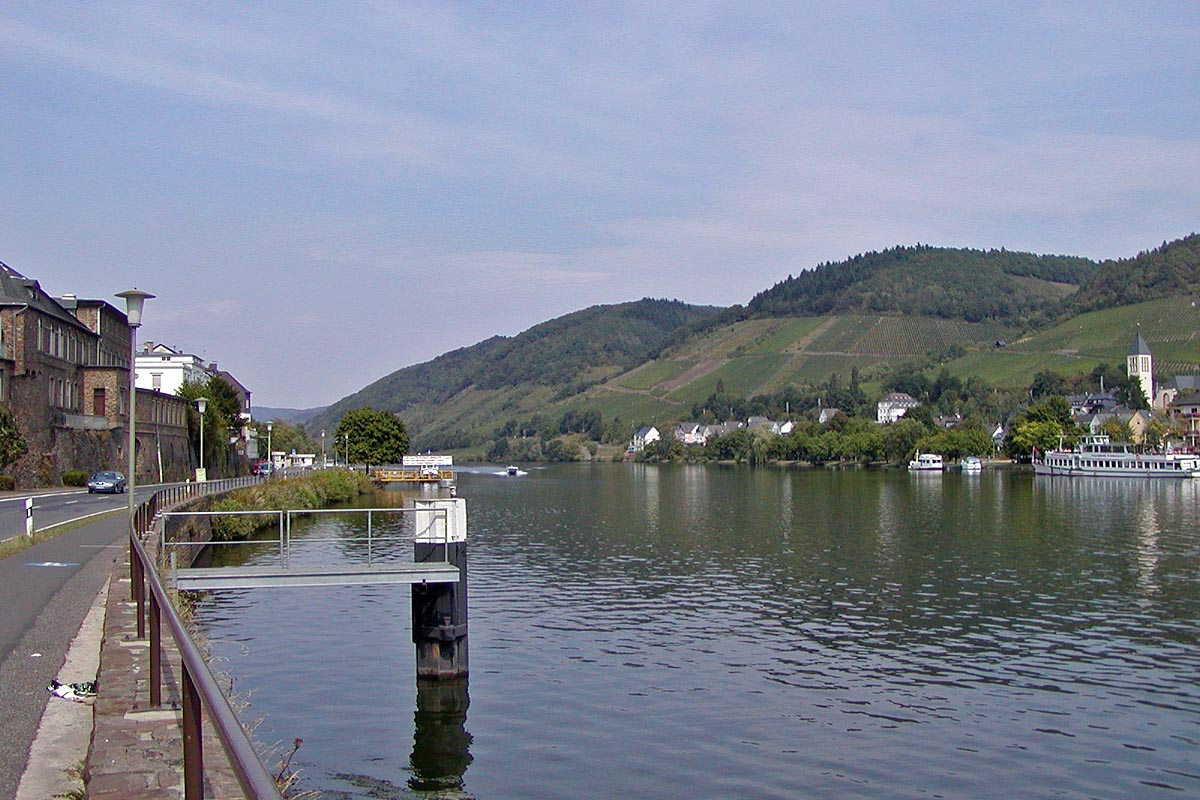
The Moselle at Bullay

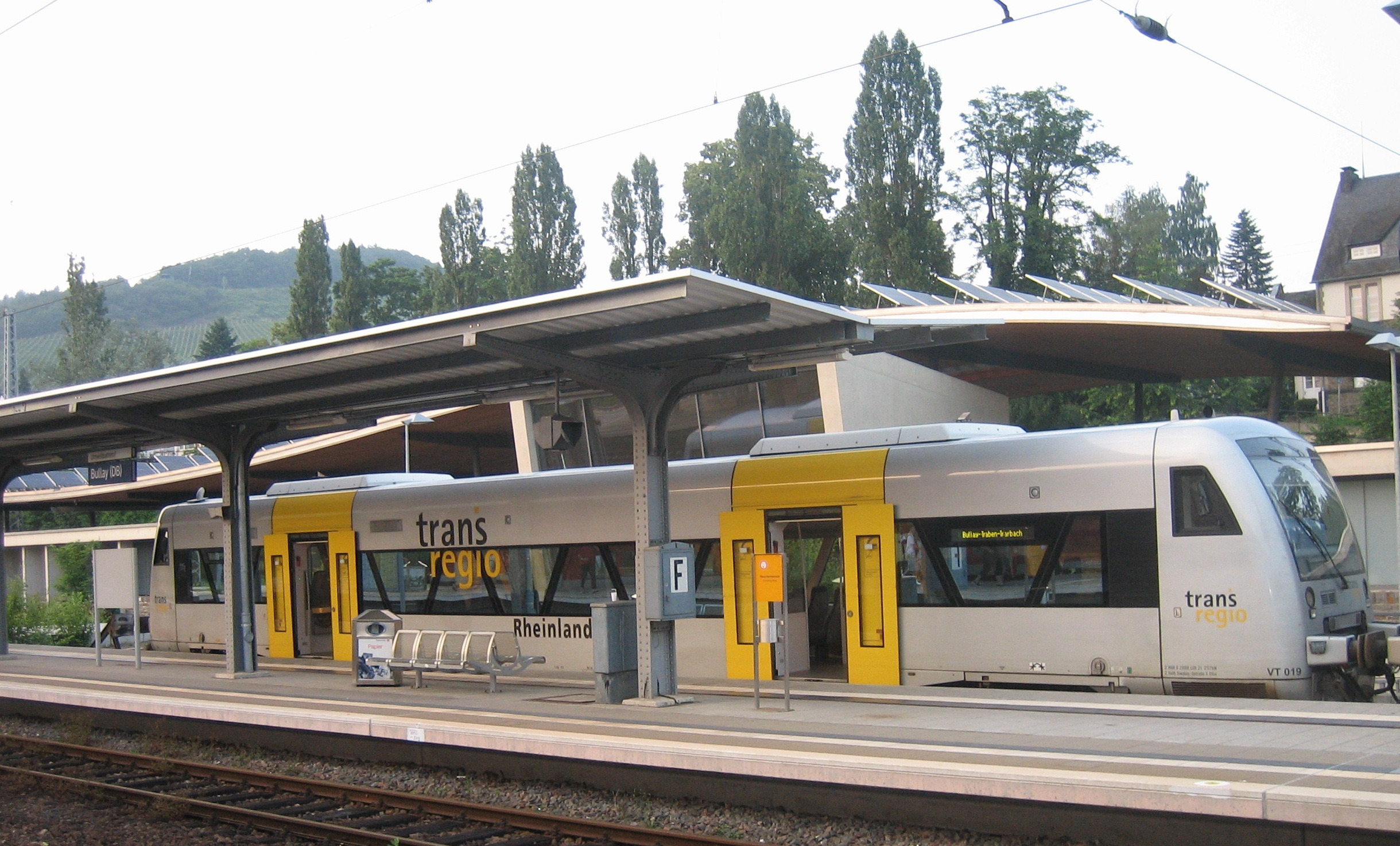
Environmental Railway Station

== Economy and infrastructure ==
=== Transport ===
Bullay is linked by the double-deck bridge to the Moselle’s left bank, and thereby to Bundesstraßen 49 (towards Koblenz) and 53 (towards Trier).

Bullay lies on the Koblenz-Trier line, completed in 1879, over which it is linked to the Deutsche Bahn InterCity network. Furthermore, the ICE 856/855 stops daily towards 6:00 and 22:00 at Bullay (DB) railway station. This “Environmental Railway Station” is moreover the last station on the Moselweinbahn ("Moselle Wine Railway") running between Bullay (DB) and Traben-Trarbach. From 1905 to 1961, another station, Bullay Süd, was the northern terminus of the Moselbahn running between Trier Nord and Bullay Süd. This line, however, was dismantled in 1961 and a bus service replaced the trains. The double-deck bridge, which carries the railway from the station to the Prinzenkopftunnel is a nationally known work of railway construction.

Bully is located in the area of the transport association Verkehrsverbund Rhein-Mosel (VRM), in the fare zone number 737.

== Famous people ==
=== Sons and daughters of the town ===
- Marcus Braun (b. 1971), writer
