= Alf, Rhineland-Palatinate =

Alf
- Municipality
- Coat of arms

- Location of Alf within Cochem-Zell district
- Interactive map of Alf
- Location within Germany Location within Rhineland-Palatinate
- Coordinates: 50°3′22.94″N 7°7′28.85″E
- Country: Germany
- State: Rhineland-Palatinate
- District: Cochem-Zell
- Municipal assoc.: Zell (Mosel)

Government
  - Mayor (2019–24): Miriam Giardini-Molzahn

Area
  - Total: 6.33 km^{2} (2.44 sq mi)
- Elevation: 95 m (312 ft)

Population (2025-12-31)
  - Total: 823
  - Density: 130/km^{2} (337/sq mi)
- Time zone: UTC+01:00 (CET)
  - Summer (DST): UTC+02:00 (CEST)
- Postal codes: 56859
- Dialling codes: 06542
- Vehicle registration: COC

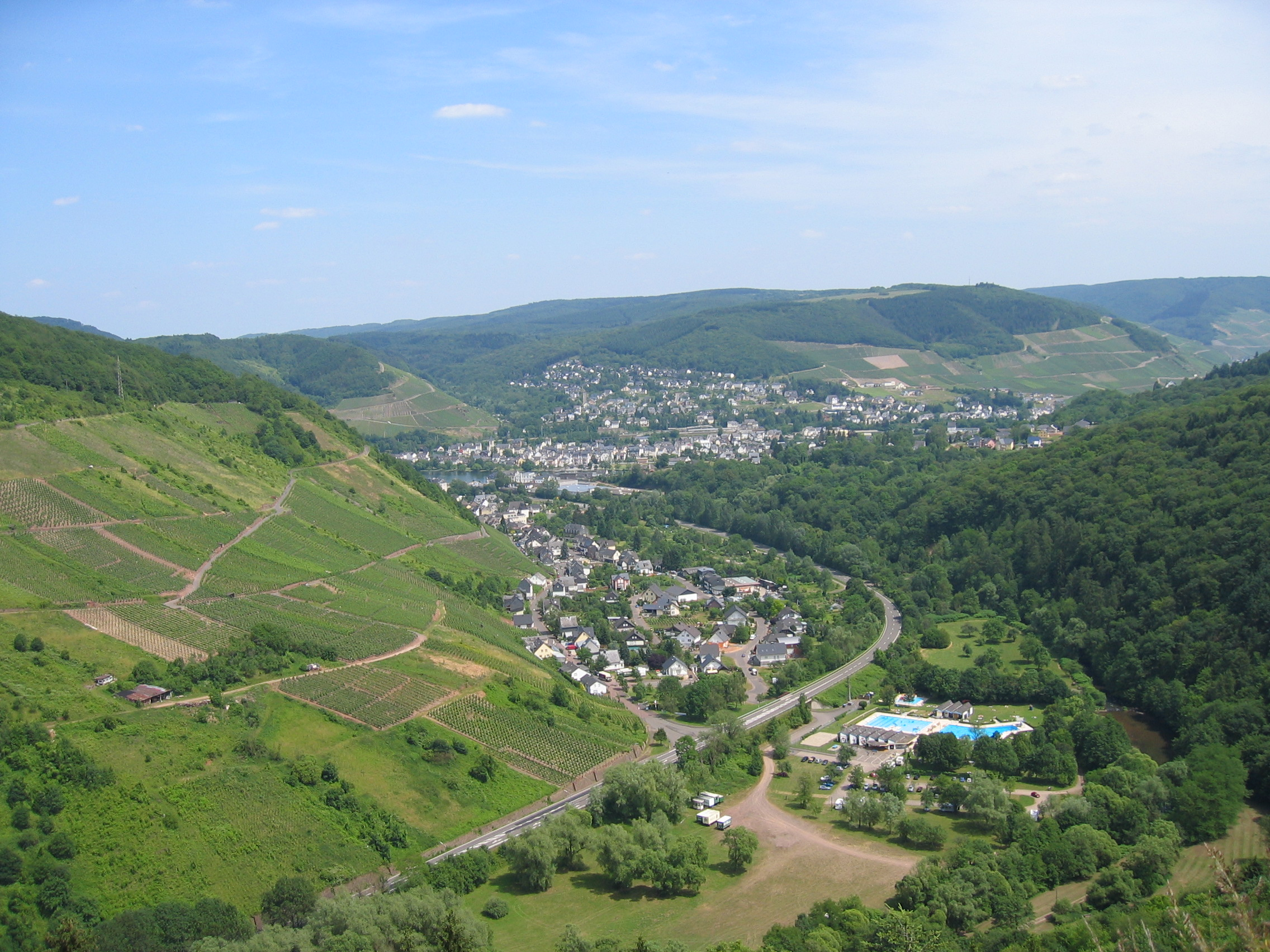
Alf with its swimming pool; in the background Bullay can be seen.

Alf is an Ortsgemeinde – a municipality belonging to a Verbandsgemeinde, a kind of collective municipality – in the Cochem-Zell district in Rhineland-Palatinate, Germany. It belongs to the Verbandsgemeinde of Zell, whose seat is in the municipality of Zell an der Mosel.

== Geography ==
=== Location ===
At Alf, the Alf, or Alfbach, empties into the Moselle. The municipality lies on the Moselle's left bank. The municipal area measures 6.33 km^{2}, of which 0.67 km^{2} is vineyards and 3.79 km^{2} is wooded.

=== Neighbouring municipalities ===
Two neighbours are Bullay and Pünderich, both on the right bank.

=== Constituent communities ===
Alf's Ortsteile are the main centre, also called Alf, and the outlying centres of Höllenthal and Alf-Fabrik. The latter is historically an industrial centre, as its name suggests (Fabrik means “factory” in German). Both these centres lie on the river Alf, inland from the Moselle.

== History ==
In pre-Roman times, the place was inhabited by Celts. In 50 BC, Alf had its first documentary mention under the Latin name Albis. The modern name is derived from this. At this time, it was a Roman settlement.

In the Middle Ages, Alf belonged to the lordship whose seat was at the nearby Castle Arras, and which was in turn an Electoral-Trier fief. According to legend, a charcoal maker named Arras was enfeoffed with the holding by the Archbishop of Trier as thanks for his, and his twelve brave sons’, deed of having beaten back a great horde of Hungarians in the Alfbach valley. What is known to history, though, is that Count Palatine Herrmann, on the spot that had quite possibly been fortified as far back as Celtic times, had the castle built in 938 as a defensive facility against Hungarian incursions. In the many centuries that followed, the castle fell into disrepair, but it was rebuilt between 1907 and 1910. Since then, the castle has been inhabited, but is nonetheless open to visitors, affording them views of the Alfbach valley, the Moselle, the Kondelwald and the Hunsrück.

Beginning in 1794, Alf lay under French rule. In 1815 it was assigned to the Kingdom of Prussia at the Congress of Vienna.

Since 1946, it has been part of the then newly founded state of Rhineland-Palatinate. Under the Verwaltungsvereinfachungsgesetz (“Administration Simplification Law”) of 18 July 1970, with effect from 7 November 1970, the municipality was grouped into the Verbandsgemeinde of Zell.

== Politics ==
=== Municipal council ===
The council is made up of 12 council members, who were elected by proportional representation at the municipal election held on 7 June 2009, and the honorary mayor as chairman.

The municipal election held on 7 June 2009 yielded the following results:

Year	SPD	CDU	FWG	Total
2009	5	4	3	12 seats
2004	4	4	4	12 seats

=== Mayor ===
Alf's mayor is Miriam Giardini-Molzahn, successor of Peter Mittler (SPD), who held office from 2009 to 2019.

=== Coat of arms ===
The municipality's arms might be described thus: Gules in base an inescutcheon couped bendwise sinister in dexter chief argent charged with a cross enhanced of the field, standing thereupon a bishop, in his dexter hand a bunch of grapes and in his sinister a bishop's staff, all Or.

== Culture and sightseeing ==
=== Museums ===
Alf's small local history museum has displays about the village's industrial history.

=== Buildings ===
Worth seeing is Castle Arras looming above the village, built in the early 12th century. Also nearby stands another castle, the Marienburg in the neighbouring municipality of Zell. The village's landmark is the belltower at the parish church built in 1734 and later remodelled in Gothic Revival style. There is also a well known statue, Christus in der Rast, from the 15th century.

A few hundred metres from the village centre stands the Electoral-Trier Amtshaus built in the 16th century, a three-floor stone building. The roof was refurbished about 1620

The following are listed buildings or sites in Rhineland-Palatinate’s Directory of Cultural Monuments:

- Saint Remigius’s Catholic Parish Church (Pfarrkirche St. Remigius), Koblenzerstraße 11 – Gothic Revival basilica, quarrystone, 1892-1894; warriors’ memorial before the church; Gothic Revival Crucifixion group, statue Christus in der Rast, about 1500; mission cross, monumental zone with graveyard and rectory.
- Auf der Hill 2 – Late Classicist villa, latter half of 19th century.
- Auf der Hill 3 – Classicist villa from 1853.
- Auf der Hill 4/5 – two-and-a-half-floor Late Classicist quarrystone house with cellar, latter half of 19th century.
- Auf Kockert – old parish church tower, three-floor tower with tent roof from 1734, but essentially mediaeval.
- Auf Kockert 6 – Electoral-Trier Amtshaus, three-floor Early Baroque house with gabled roof, late 16th century, remodelled possibly in 1620-1621 (roof truss dendrochronology), portal from 1700.
- Auf Kockert 10 – former school, timber-frame building, partly solid, essentially early 17th century; oven.
- Auf Kockert 14 – Art Nouveau villa, about 1900.
- Auf Tannerd – villa, Classicist Revival building with mansard roof, 1920s.
- Brunnenstraße 1 – timber-frame house, partly solid, about 1600.
- Ferdinand-Remy-Straße 1 – Late Historicist shophouse, 1902.
- Graveyard – graveyard cross from 1869, four grave crosses from 1848, 18(??); late 19th century, about 1900.
- Junkergasse 8 – three-floor timber-frame house, partly solid, from 1760.
- Koblenzerstraße 12 – plastered timber-frame house, latter half of 18th century.
- Koblenzerstraße 18 – “Hotel zur Post”, former Thurn und Taxis estate, stately post-Baroque plastered building, 1810.
- At Mühlenstraße 2 – Gothic Revival sandstone cross.
- Mühlenstraße 13 – house, partly slated, Swiss chalet style, about 1910.
- Schulgasse 2 – timber-frame house, partly solid, 18th century, but bears the date 1580.
- Wilburgstraße 5 – late mediaeval Burgmann’s quarrystone house from 1448 (according to dendrochronology).
- Mountain chapel, north of the village, small aisleless church, 19th century; Pietà from 18th century.
- Burg Arras (castle) – essentially a mediaeval castle complex, fallen into disrepair by late 18th century, expanded in 1907–1910, architect P. Marx, Trier.
- Coat of arms on Bundesstraße 49, 18th century (?).

== Economy and infrastructure ==
=== Established businesses ===
The biggest employer in Alf and the surrounding region is the Finnish packaging company Huhtamäki, which maintains one of its 70 or so plants worldwide in the outlying centre of Alf-Fabrik. It makes stiff plastics and hard paper for packaging purposes.

=== Transport ===
Across the river from Alf lies the bigger centre of Bullay with a railway station on the Koblenz-Trier railway, easily reached over the Alf-Bullay double-deck bridge. Alf is the location of the junction of Bundesstraßen 49 and 53.

== Famous people ==
=== Sons and daughters of the town ===
- Peter A. Juley (1862–1837), photographer
- Jo Niemeyer (b. 16 June 1946), graphic artist, designer and painter

== Sundry ==
After the great success of the US television programme ALF, the roadsign bearing the municipality's name was stolen many times in the late 1980s in a situation similar to what had been happening to Fucking in Austria. To stem the rash of thefts, the municipality finally offered copies of the roadsign for sale, printed on one side only. To make these signs distinguishable from the ones that were actually posted at the roadside, they had the municipal stamp and the mayor's signature on the back.
