= Karl Hammes =

German operatic baritone (1896–1939)

- Born: 25 March 1896; Zell, Rhine Province, Kingdom of Prussia
- Died: 6 September 1939 (aged 43); Warsaw, Republic of Poland
- Education: Hochschule für Musik und Tanz Köln
- Occupation: Baritone
- Years active: 1925–1937
- Employers: Kroll Opera House; Vienna State Opera
- Style: Opera
- Military career
- Allegiance: German Empire; German Reich
- Branch: Imperial Army; Luftstreitkräfte; Luftwaffe
- Rank: Leutnant
- Unit: See list: Schleswig-Holsteinisches Fußartillerie-Regiment Nr. 9; Flieger-Abteilung (A) 276; Jagdstaffel 35; Jagdgeschwader 132; Zerstörergeschwader 1
- Conflicts: World War I; Western Front; World War II; Invasion of Poland

Karl Hammes (25 March 1896 – 6 September 1939) was a German operatic baritone, also a fighter pilot in the First and Second World War. He worked at the Bayreuth Festival, in Berlin, Cologne, Salzburg and Vienna, among others.

== Life and career ==
Hammes was born in Zell. In August 1914, with the outbreak of World War I, Hammes joined an artillery regiment (the Schleswig-Holstienische Fußartillerie-Regiment Nr. 9) as a Fahnenjunker (officer cadet), serving on the Western Front from October that year. In February 1915, Hammes was promoted to Leutnant, and in October, his unit was transferred to the Balkans for operations against Serbia. In November 1916, he applied to join the German air service, and in April 1917, he joined Flieger-Abteilung (A) 276 as a reconnaissance pilot. In August 1917, he left his unit to train as a fighter pilot, and quickly completed training, joining Jagdstaffel 35 later that month. Hammes claimed four French and British aircraft shot down, but was wounded on 9 September 1917 while scoring his final victory, and spent several months in hospital. He ended the First World War in the rank of major.

Afterwards he studied voice at the Hochschule für Musik und Tanz Köln. He made his stage debut at the Cologne Opera in 1925. From 1927, he was a member of the Kroll Opera House in Berlin, where Otto Klemperer conducted. Also in 1927, Hammes appeared at the Bayreuth Festival as Amfortas in Parsifal and as Gunther in the Götterdämmerung. From 1929 to 1935, he was a member of the Vienna State Opera, with appearances at the Salzburg Festival, where he performed the title role in Mozart's Don Giovanni from 1929 to 1931. From 1935, Hammes was a regular guest at the Berlin State Opera from 1935. He was appointed a Kammersänger.

In June 1937, Hammes joined the Luftwaffe, and in July, joined the fighter wing Jagdgeschwader 132 (JG 132). In November 1938, JG 132 was split up, with Hammes joining the newly established Zerstörergeschwader 141, which was redesignated Zerstörergeschwader 1 (ZG 1) in 1939, with Hannes commanding the 1st Staffel of the unit, equipped with the Messerschmitt Bf 110 heavy fighter. ZG 1 took part in the German invasion of Poland in September 1939, and Hammes was shot down and killed when escorting a bombing mission against targets near Warsaw on 6 September 1939.

Hammes made only few recordings. He appears as Harlekino in a complete recording of Ariadne auf Naxos by Richard Strauss, recorded for Funk-Stunde Berlin on 11 June 1935, and in the title role of Don Giovanni, a recording for the Reichsrundfunk on 27 March 1936. Hammes also took part in two films, including Königswalzer (The Royal Waltz).

Hammes died in Warsaw on 6 September 1939, at age 43.

== Sources ==
- Uwe Harten: Hammes, Karl in Oesterreichisches Musiklexikon. Inline-edition, Vienna 2002 ff., ISBN 3-7001-3077-5; Druckausgabe: volume 2, Austrian Academy of Sciences printing house, Vienna 2003, ISBN 3-7001-3044-9.
- Alfons Friderichs (Autor): Hammes, Karl, in Persönlichkeiten des Kreises Cochem-Zell. Kliomedia, Trier 2004, ISBN 3-89890-084-3, p. 139.
- Mückler, Jörg (November–December 2008). "Le chanteur-guerrier: Karl Hammes, entre cockpit et scène d'opéra". Avions (in French). No. 166. pp. 35–39. ISSN 1253-5354.
