= Maria Reese =

German politician and writer (1889–1958)

- Born: Maria Meyer; 5 January 1889; Michelbach, Prussian Rhine province, Germany
- Died: 9 October 1958 (aged 69); Zell (Mosel), Rhineland-Palatinate, West Germany
- Occupations: Activist & politician Writer and journalist
- Political party: SPD; KPD
- Spouse: Gottlieb Reese (1880–1949)
- Children: Harro Dagobert Reese (1923–1944)
- Parent(s): Anton Meyer; Katharina Eis/Meyer

Maria Reese (born Maria Meyer: 5 January 1889 – 9 October 1958) was a German teacher who became a writer and journalist. She was also politically active, and sat as a member of the national parliament (Reichstag) between 1928 and 1933.

For most of her time in the Reichstag she was a Communist member. However, in 1933, after spending time in Moscow she became appalled by the careerist functionaries surrounding Stalin. (The dictator's potential rivals for power and influence had, in most cases, disappeared from the scene by this time.) She managed to escape from the Soviet Union and pursued a complicated political trajectory which included a period working for the Nazi government in the Anti-Comintern department of the Propaganda Ministry.

Her son was shot for suspected desertion in 1944, but a few months later she received a letter from the military high court stating that this had resulted from an error. After 1945 she re-converted Roman Catholicism.

== Life ==
=== Provenance and early years ===
Maria Meyer was born at Michelbach, a village in the hills north of Trier, on the western edge of the Prussian Rhine province. Her father, Anton Meyer, was a primary/middle school teacher. Maria attended school locally and moved into a teachers' training college in Bonn. She took a permanent teaching post at Lüxem in her home region. Early on she came into conflict with a schools inspector who asserted that she was not qualified to do the work of a chaplain because she was female. She increasingly came to reject the Catholicism with which she had grown up, turning to politics instead. The outbreak of war and the accompanying conscription of male teachers created a desperate shortage, and she took a new teaching post at Schladt in 1914. However, after three years she found herself condemned by a military court to dismissal from the profession and a five-month prison term because she was found to have been employing French prisoners of war. By the time the war ended in 1918 she was writing that she had a yearning for socialism which "might rescue humanity from penury and misery and more war". ("...die Sehnsucht nach dem Sozialismus, der die Menschheit von Not und Elend und vor weiteren Kriegen erretten sollte.")

She joined the Social Democratic Party ("Sozialdemokratische Partei Deutschlands" / SPD) in 1919. Between 1920 and 1924 she worked in Trier as an editor for a newspaper called "Volkswacht", specialising in women's and youth issues.

In 1923 she married Gottlieb Reese (1880–1949), a Social Democrat activist and a former parliamentarian in the Prussian regional legislature (Landtag). Their son Dagobert was born around this time. Extension of the French military occupation separated their home district from the rest of Germany. Maria Reese was briefly arrested. In October 1923 she followed her husband, who had already been expelled, to Hanover where they settled, and where she supported herself as a writer.

=== Reichstag deputy ===
Maria Reese on her Reichstag defection from the SPD to the Communist Party

"I believed the Communist Party was more radical, but nevertheless still a socialist party. I dismissed negative reports about the Soviet Union as propaganda."

"Ich hielt die Kommunistische Partei für eine radikalere, aber immerhin doch sozialistische Partei und die negativen Berichte über die Sowjetunion für Propaganda."

In May 1928 Maria Reese was elected to the national parliament (Reichstag) for the South Hanover-Braunschweig electoral district. She represented, at this stage, the Social Democratic Party (SPD). Her candidature had resulted from her having been talent spotted the previous year by Gustav Noske who had been impressed by her speeches. It was also in 1928 that her marriage failed. What Noske had not anticipated was her defection in 1929 to the Communist party, and it was as a communist member that she sat as a Reichstag deputy till 1933. Her own later explanations for the defection indicate that she had found the SPD insufficiently radical, while she had, back then, been inclined to believe the intellectual case supporting the Communist Party's genuine socialist credentials, while dismissing negative reports emerging from the Soviet Union as propaganda. It does appear, in addition, that Ernst Torgler, the leader of the Communist Party group in the Reichstag, quickly identified her, among the new intake of SPD members, as a potential recruit, and worked hard to encourage her to come on over. In the Reichstag she applied her eloquence to attacking the rising Nazi Party and, in particular, the powerful current of antisemitism within it.

Between 1930 and 1932 Reese combined her work in the Reichstag with editorship of the Berlin-based magazine, "Die rote Einheitsfront" ("The Red Unity Front"). She was working closely with Clara Zetkin at this time.

=== Flight ===
In January 1933 the Nazis took power and converted Germany into a one-party dictatorship. In the space of a couple of months political activity (except in support of the Nazi party) became illegal. On 28 February 1933, as the Reichstag burned, and the Soviet authorities, to the very great disappointment of Communist activists in Germany, still had nothing to say about the Nazi take-over in Germany, Maria Reese emigrated via Denmark to Sweden. At the end of March she was detained by the Swedish authorities and deported to the Soviet Union. She remained briefly in Leningrad and then moved on to Moscow which was rapidly becoming a centre for Communist political refugees escaping from Nazi Germany.

=== Moscow ===
Léon Trotsky endorsed Maria Reese's disappointment over the Soviet failure to react more visibly to the Nazi takeover in Germany

"The stalinist bureaucracy took its revenge [against Reese] because a responsible comrade, till recently one of its own, has stated openly and honestly the truth about the leadership, operation and principals of the Comintern. The bureaucracy will forgive cowardice, deceit and betrayal, but on one condition: that they remain within its own walls. For these people, mutualised responsibility has replaced the duties of revolution and Marxism. The struggle for personal status, for party promotion, and for a better standard of living have pushed the struggle for the dictatorship of the proletariat into the background. Maria Reese has been convinced of that by the tragic experience of the proletariat in Germany."

La bureaucratie stalinienne prend sa revanche du fait qu'une camarade responsable, qui était encore tout récemment dans ses rangs, a dit ouvertement et honnêtement la vérité sur la direction, le régime et les mœurs du Comintern. La bureaucratie pardonne la couardise, le mensonge, la trahison à une seule condition : que cela ne sorte pas de la maison [6]. Pour ces gens là, il y a longtemps que les lois de la responsabilité mutuelle ont remplacé celles de la révolution et du marxisme. La lutte pour un prestige personnel enflé, pour des postes et pour un niveau de vie assuré, a relégué au second plan la lutte pour la dictature prolétarienne. Maria Reese s'en est convaincue à travers la tragique expérience du prolétariat allemand.
Léon Trotsky 17 November 1933

In Moscow she re-connected with Clara Zetkin. Zetkin, mentally alert but physically frail, was thirty years her senior and the two of them had become close friends, working together in Berlin during the final years of the Weimar regime. Zetkin was by now an iconic figure within the German Communist Party, but Reese later wrote in a letter that she had nonetheless become a lonely figure among the younger generation of Communist exiles in Moscow, and had been deeply disappointed by the German party functionaries she found there. Wilhelm Florin, Walter Ulbricht, Hermann Remmele und Heinz Neumann she identified as "swindlers, scoundrels and liars" ("Gesindel, Schufte und Lügner"). Fritz Heckert she condemned as a "conceited criminal pea brain" ("eitlen, verbrecherischen Hohlkopf"). Zetkin even ventured to share with her friend an opinion on Comrade Stalin: a "devil".

Reese may have been infected by her friends' disenchantment with many of their comrades in Moscow and she was clearly deeply disappointed that all the talk of international workers' solidarity proclaimed at successive Comintern congresses during the previous fifteen years had counted for so little with the Kremlin when the Nazis had taken power in Berlin. She was openly critical of the Soviet government position. She kept trying to organise meetings and discussions in order to encourage a more vigorous Soviet response, but instead of triggering a revolutionary mobilisation of the workers of the world against fascism, she was repeatedly blocked. By the early summer of 1933, convinced that Stalinism represented a betrayal of the labour movement, she was on the verge of being banned from Moscow.

=== Paris ===
Léon Trotsky wrote an opening preface, introducing Maria Reese's November 1933 open letter to the Communist Party:

"Maria Reese has been "excluded" [from the Comintern] because of her courageous open letter, and only after the publication of it, which means she herself has broken with the Comintern. Identifying moral bankruptcy for what it is is the pressing duty of a sincere and genuine revolutionary. If Reese's letter can have some influence on the fate of communists persecuted by Hitler, and in particular on the Reichstag Fire Trial, it is only by providing precious evidence in support of the accused [Communist scapegoats]! It is clear from Reese's letter, even for those too blind to read it, that the leadership of the official [Communist] party were a very long way from contemplating an insurrection [when the Reichstag was torched], and far from having undertaken any preparation for an insurrection, and therefore a long way from setting off any sort of "signal" to announce a general insurrection by setting fire to the Reichstag."

"Maria Reese est “ exclue ” à cause de sa courageuse lettre ouverte, et seulement après la publication de cette dernière, c'est‑à‑dire après qu'elle ait elle‑même rompu avec le Comintern. Appeler les faillis publiquement par leur véritable nom de faillis est le devoir immédiat d'un révolutionnaire authentique et sincère. Si la lettre de Reese peut avoir quelque influence sur le sort des communistes persécutés par Hitler, et particulièrement sur le cours du procès du Reichstag, c'est seulement en tant que précieux témoignage en faveur des accusés ! Il est clair d'après cette lettre, même pour des aveugles, que la direction du parti officiel était bien loin de penser à l'insurrection, à des préparatifs pour une insurrection, et par conséquent à des “ signaux ” pour l'insurrection du genre de l'incendie du Reichstag ! "
Léon Trotsky 17 November 1933

Helped by Clara Zetkin, Reese succeeded in leaving Moscow, and moved to Paris which had become the other principal centre for exiled German Communist leaders and activists. Back in the Soviet Union, Clara Zetkin died in June 1933.

In Paris Reese was able to be more open in her condemnation of Soviet inaction in the face of the Nazi takeover at the start of the year. She was critical of the Comintern. She argued with Willi Münzenberg and criticised the "alternative Reichstag Fire trial" that he was organising in London (documented in the so-called "Brown book" of 1933). She characterised Münzenberg's "Popular front against the Nazi Government" as an unholy alliance between imperialists and the German Communist Party to damage German workers.

She rejected an invitation to return to Moscow and, on 26 October 1933, resigned from the exiled German Communist Party. Her sharply critical resignation letter was widely reported in leftwing newspapers. "L'Humanité", the official newspaper of the French Communist Party, dismissed it as "irresponsible chit-chat". Friends tried to arrange a marriage for her in order to legalise her residence in France, but this came to nothing. Her very public resignation from the Communist Party, exacerbated by her association with Léon Trotsky's "International Group of German Communists" ("Gruppe Internationale Kommunisten Deutschlands " / IKD), placed her life in some peril from NKVD assassins in the west. She appears to have been in close contact with Trotsky, although for very good reasons, Trotsky's own precise whereabouts during this period were (and are) not generally knowable: it is known that he had removed his famous beard. On 17 November 1933 she published an open letter (incorporating a supportive preface by Léon Trotsky) to the Communist Party and to the Comintern in the magazine "Unser Work" ("Our Word"): in her letter she again distanced herself from the Stalinist version of Communism ("... von der kommunistischen Politik stalinistischer Prägung"). Her application to a Jewish Help Committee for support was rejected on the express instructions of the German Communist Party.

=== Return to the fatherland ===
Shunned by Communists and harassed by the authorities in Paris, she resolved to return to Germany, relocating to the Saarland, a part of Germany which at this point was still under French military occupation. For some months she continued with her membership of the Trotskyist IKD. At the start of 1935, following a referendum, the Saarland was returned to Germany. Whether because of the changed frontiers, or because she had moved again, by this time Maria Reese was back in Germany. In the autumn of 1934, she had attended a party at Lüxem, the little town where a quarter century earlier she had taken her first teaching job. Her return was celebrated with enthusiasm. "So much love of the home country was almost intolerable." The villagers were in the mood "to party". At the end of the evening a choir formed and burst into The Horst Wessel Song, which the Nazis has used as their "party anthem" since 1930: each of the revellers raised his/her right arm. "Suddenly I no longer knew my old intimates any more," she later wrote. Then she realised that everyone was watching her. And she "held back no longer".

Maria Reese evidently continued to be forthright in sharing her views. With so many exiled German communists in Moscow, rumours were beginning to filter back to Germany that the Soviet Union was not quite the paradise on earth that some had asserted: there were whispers about the mass arrests and disappearances triggered by the dictator's paranoia. In Germany the authorities got to hear about this convert from communism who had returned to the Fatherland, and Reese received a telegramme summoning her to Berlin. She was invited to speak on the radio. Subjects she might like to consider included the Saarland referendum and her "flight from the red hell [of Moscow under communism]". Nazi propaganda radio services for which she broadcast included "La Voix de la Paix" und "Radio Humanité". She later said that she thought, rightly or wrongly, that she might be able to influence the Nazis: "I did not speak for National Socialism: I spoke for Germany".

=== A commission from Dr. Goebbels ===
After she moved to Berlin Maria Reese received a commission for what would be her final book. It was, informally, to be a joint work. Her co-author was Ernst Torgler, a comrade from their time together as Communist deputies in the pre-Nazi Reichstag. Both Torgler and Reese were now working for the Nazi Propaganda Ministry under its hands-on minister, Joseph Goebbels. Nevertheless, the Nazis recognised that Reese was not entirely one of their own. Her Gestapo file identifies her paradoxically, under its reference number "File B. Nbr. 328/35" as an "unreliable trusted person" ("unzuverlässige Vertrauensperson"). The two of them lived just outside Berlin and were paid by the Gestapo. Reese's own mood became increasingly stressed. The book "Abrechnung mit Moskau" ("Break with Moscow"), appeared, complete with the requisite antisemitic undertones, in 1938. It was a bestseller.

=== Later years and personal tragedy ===
After 1938 Maria Reese retreated into obscurity. There is mention of her having cared for her mother in Lüxem.

War resumed in September 1939. Tragedy struck in June 1944 when her son was shot near Kishinev for suspected desertion. A few months later his mother was informed by the military high court that this had been a mistake. Maria Reese was also one of several thousand detained by the Gestapo after the failed attempt to assassinate the leader, in a mass round up of people whose names were on Nazi files because they had been politically prominent as opponents of the Nazi Party before 1933. She survived.

War ended in May 1945 and Maria Reese was detained again, this time by the French who had returned as an occupying power. Because of her past as an opportunist "employee of Dr. Goebbels", between 1946 and 1948 she was interned by the French Military government in a prison camp.

After 1948 she returned to her work as a school teacher. She remained in or near her home "Eifel" region in the hills to the north of Trier, although she never settled in any one place for very long. In her personal life, she recovered a deep attachment to Roman Catholicism. After a succession of house moves, in 1958 she moved to Zell on the Moselle, a short distance downstream from the border with Luxembourg. On 9 October 1958, two days after moving into her new home, Maria Reese died suddenly.
