= Jo Niemeyer =

German painter (born 1946)

Jo Niemeyer (born in 1946 in Alf, Germany) is a concrete artist and designer. Niemeyer's work is based on the observation of nature through the use of mathematics and, especially, the "Golden Section" of the Fibonacci Sequence. He has experimented with various media such as photography and film video, and today, he principally uses painting to compose his graphic works. Niemeyer also realized sculptural objects and big scale projects such as the land art "20 steps around the world".

== Biography ==
Jo Niemeyer was born in 1946 in the German village Alf. He comes from a long-time artist family. His mother was a textile designer and worked in Saabrücken at the former State School for Art and Crafts, where she was in charge of a handloom weaving factory. His father began to paint at a relatively young age, in abstract and concrete art. Unfortunately, his paintings were considered to be degenerate and most of his works were destroyed or lost during WWII.

After three years of studying photography and graphic art, Niemeyer executed his first geometrical painting in 1966. He travelled in several countries, including the United States and Canada, and in Scandinavia where he was particularly fascinated by nature. In 1967, he pursued his training in industrial design at the Finnish Institute for Art "Atheneum". He decided in 1970 to quit his job as professional photographer to become a full-time independent artist.

In Finland, he met artist colleagues Lars-Gunnar Nordstrom and Matti Kujasalo, the former director of the Finnish Academy of Art in Helsinki. In the 80s, Kujasalo asked Niemeyer to lecture about different print techniques in the graphic art department. During this time, Niemeyer built up his knowledge of Finnish architecture. It was also in Helsinki in the late 60s that Niemeyer met his wife, Tuula Partanen. in 1972 she founded Edition Partanen which specialised in silkscreen prints and publication of graphic and art portfolios. The studio was established in South Germany with a showroom in Zurich, Switzerland. Edition Partanen collaborated with artists such as Rupprecht Geiger, Matti Kujasalo, Ilya Bolotowsky and Niemeyer himself.

Niemeyer began to elaborate his big scale project "20 steps around the world" which would be installed in 1997 in the City of Ropinsalmi in Finland. In this project, he explained, the Earth replaced the canvas. According to him, Earth is the carrier of his artistic work being integrated into the creative process only by minimal changes. In the context of this work, an arbitrarily defined route around the Earth is divided systematically and exactly into 20 segments which develop to a dynamic, logarithmic progression according to the 'Golden Section'. The 20 steps are visualized by using an installation of 20 stainless-steel elements around the globe, precisely located on continents. The location of the points is achieved by using a computer and satellite navigation.

Over the years, Niemeyer has held successful one-man and group shows in Scandinavia, Italy, Switzerland, Israel, USA, England, Japan, Argentina, and Finland. His murals in public buildings can be found in countries all around the world including Switzerland and Germany, and in Scandinavia. Featured in numerous international publications and films, his works are in public and private collections and museums including in Japan, Germany, Canada, the Netherlands, Finland, Germany and Austria. Today, Jo Niemeyer works and lives in Germany, France and Finland.

== Literature ==
- Matthias Diets: Lights, Benedikt Taschen Verlag, 1993
- Bernhard Holeczek: Von zwei Quadraten, Wilhelm-Hack-Museum, Ludwigshafen, 1987
- Dietmar Guderian: Mathematik in der Kunst der letzten 30 Jahre, Ebringen/Br. 1990.
- Alvar Aalto Museum: Graphica Creativa, Jyväskylä, 1990
- Kurt Naef: Der Spielzeugmacher / The Toymaker, Basel, 2006
- Arthur Ruegg: Schweizer Möbel und Interieurs im 20. Jahrhundert, Birkhäuser, 2002

== Important Shows ==
- 2013 „Jo Niemeyer", Mathematikum Gießen.
- 2009 Jo Niemeyer im Arithmeum Bonn
- 2008 „Pure Abstract Art" Mondriaanhuis, Amersfoort/Niederlande.
- 2008 "Hommage à Vordemberge-Gildewart", Kunsthalle Osnabrück.
- 2005 „Experiment konkret 2005" Museum für konkrete Kunst Ingolstadt.
- 2004 „konkrete Kunst aus Baden-Württemberg" Warschau.

== Museums (selection) ==
- Pinakothek der Moderne, München
- Universität Tel Aviv,
- Museum Pecs (Ungarn)
- Forum konkrete Kunst (Erfurt)
- Bauhaus Archiv (Berlin)
- Museum für konkrete Kunst (Ingolstadt)
- Stiftung für konkrete Kunst (Reutlingen)
- Museum Ushiroyama (Higashiawakura, Japan)
- Finnish National Gallery (Helsinki)
- Mondriaanhuis (Amersfoort/Niederlande)
- Nickle Arts Museum - University of Calgary
- Institut für konkrete Kunst (Rehau)
