= Peter A. Juley =

- Born: 1862; Alf, Kingdom of Prussia
- Died: January 13, 1937 (aged 74–75); New York City, U.S.
- Occupation: Photographer

Peter A. Juley (1862 - January 13, 1937) was a German-born American photographer. He emigrated to the United States at age 26 in 1888 and founded a studio in Cold Spring, New York in 1896. He worked for several publications, including Harper's Weekly, and he photographed President Theodore Roosevelt. He also became the official photographer of the National Academy of Design and the New York Public Library. After his son Paul joined him in New York City in 1907, his firm changed its name to Peter A. Juley and Son, and it "became the largest and most respected fine-art photography studio in New York."

== Gallery ==
Photographs by Peter A. Juley and Son
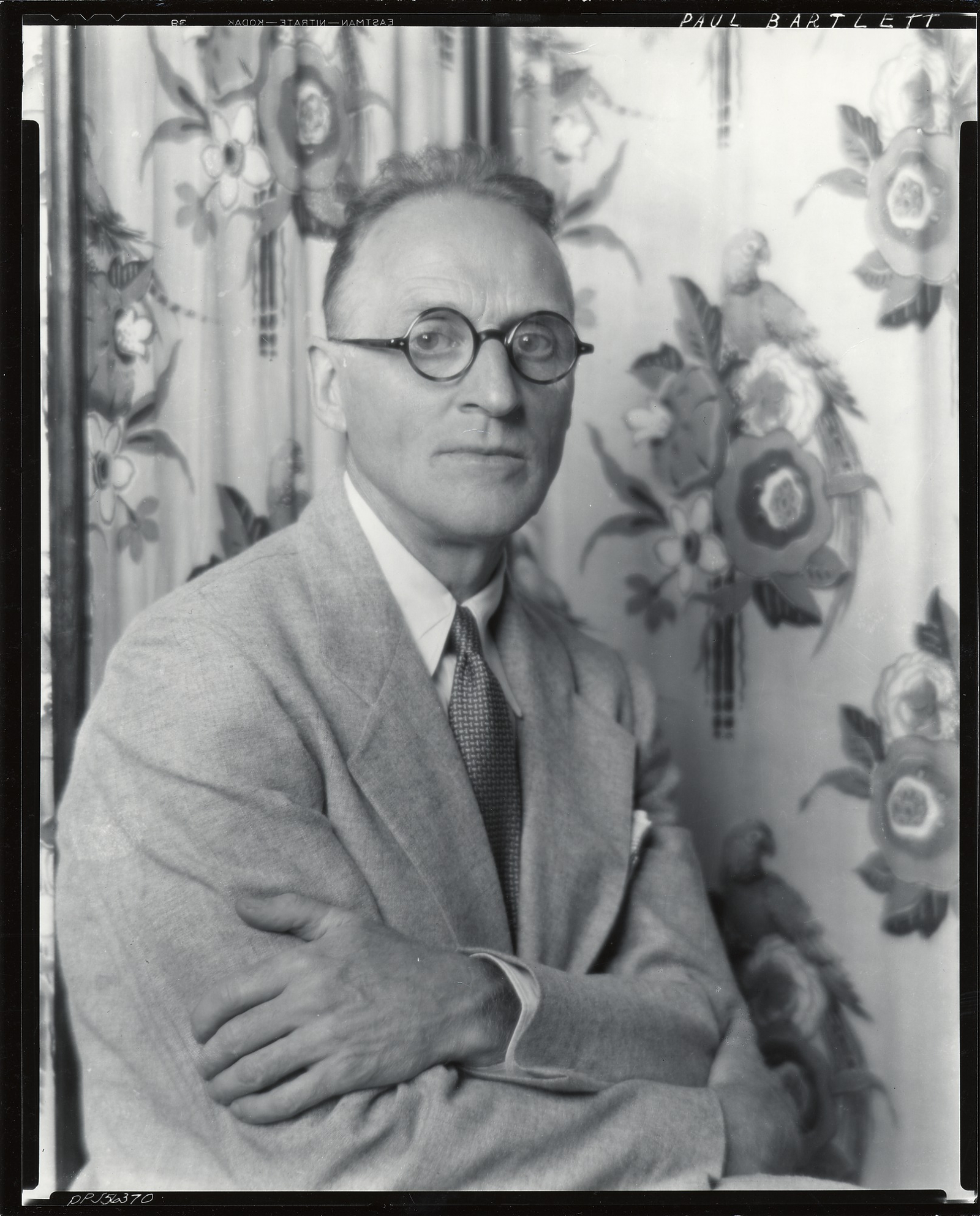
Photograph of Paul Bartlett

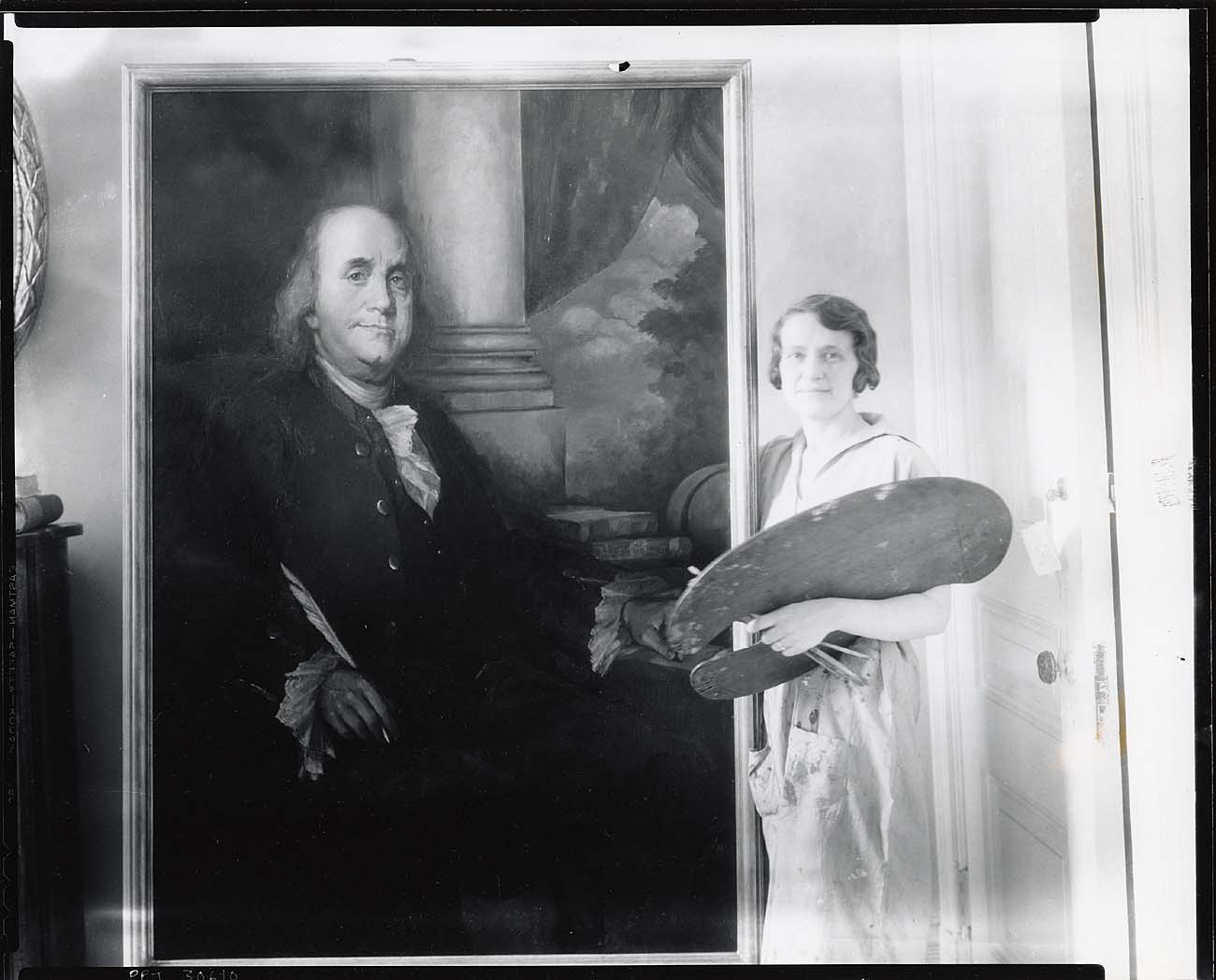
Photograph of Countess Maria Zichy beside a portrait of Benjamin Franklin

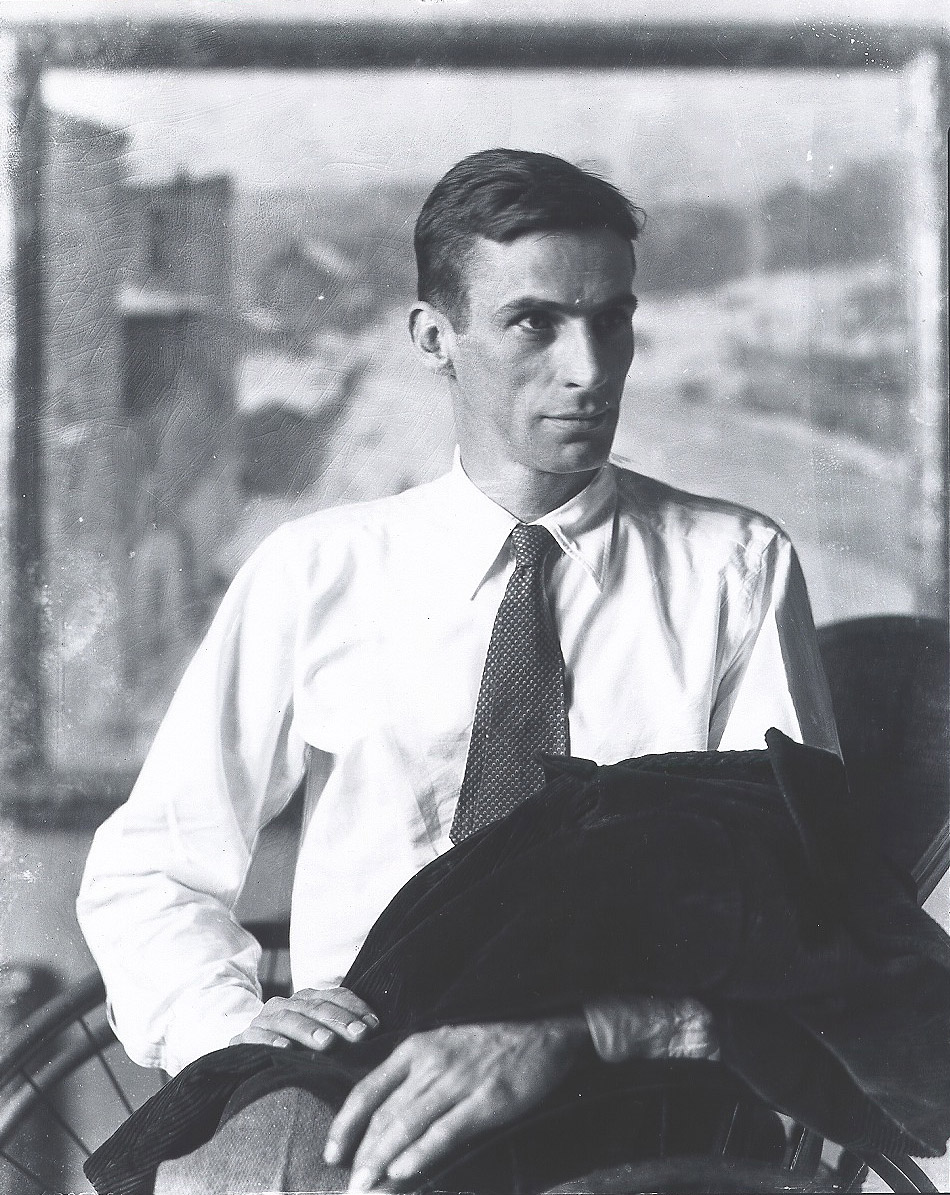
Photograph of John Fulton Folinsbee

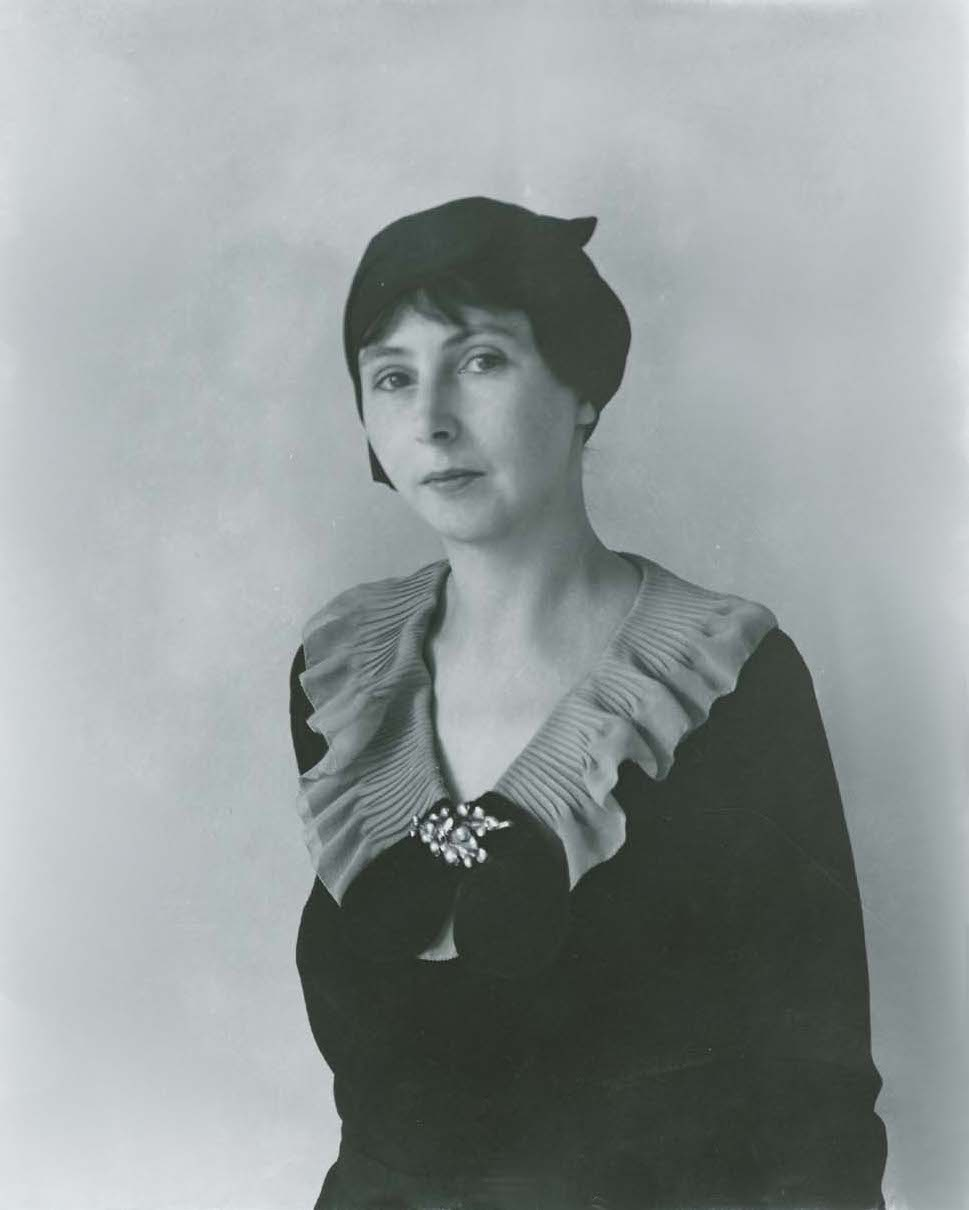
Photograph of Peggy Bacon
