= Pünderich =

- Municipality
- Coat of arms

- Location of Pünderich within Cochem-Zell district
- Interactive map of Pünderich
- Location within Germany Location within Rhineland-Palatinate
- Coordinates: 50°2′29″N 7°7′56″E
- Country: Germany
- State: Rhineland-Palatinate
- District: Cochem-Zell
- Municipal assoc.: Zell (Mosel)

Government
  - Mayor (2019–24): Rainer Nilles

Area
  - Total: 5.41 km^{2} (2.09 sq mi)
- Elevation: 110 m (360 ft)

Population (2025-12-31)
  - Total: 817
  - Density: 151/km^{2} (391/sq mi)
- Time zone: UTC+01:00 (CET)
  - Summer (DST): UTC+02:00 (CEST)
- Postal codes: 56862
- Dialling codes: 06542
- Vehicle registration: COC
- Website: www.puenderich.de

Pünderich is an Ortsgemeinde – a municipality belonging to a Verbandsgemeinde, a kind of collective municipality – in the Cochem-Zell district in Rhineland-Palatinate, Germany. It belongs to the Verbandsgemeinde of Zell, whose seat is in the municipality of Zell an der Mosel.

== Geography ==
The municipality lies on the river Moselle inside a bend, on the right bank, not far upstream from Zell, which lies roughly 3 kilometres (2 mi) away as the crow flies.

== History ==
=== Name ===
The placename Pünderich is of Celtic origin. The oldest known name for the place is Pontaricum, meaning “Place with Ferry” or “Ferryman’s Place”.

=== Roman and Frankish times ===
Things such as ceramics and coins have been found in districts of Pünderich, suggesting a Roman settlement from the 1st century BC until the 3rd to 4th century AD.

About 250, the Franks showed up in the region for the first time. Only 25 years later, they went along with the Alamanni plundering the Moselle valley, leaving extensive destruction in their wake. Between 408 and 460 also came troubled times as Vandals, Suebi and Franks once more marauded across the land. Trade and transport collapsed utterly.

In the 6th century, the Frankish kings Christianized the Moselle valley and the first church in the Zeller Hamm – the local bow in the Moselle – arose. In 882, however, the Norman invasions led to a cultural collapse in the region.

=== First documentary mention ===
In 1128, Pünderich had its first documentary mention in a document in which Pope Honorius II bequeathed an estate in Pundricho to the Springiersbach Monastery. An even older document describes a vineyard in the cadastral area of “Zinselt”, across the river from Pünderich near the former ford on the Moselle. Other documents from between 1143 and 1148 name the village as Punterche, Pundriche, Punderacha or Pondreka.

=== Church history ===
Pünderich had very early on a relationship to the Marienburg, a now dissolved Augustinian convent. The church on the Petersberge was once the mother church to the branch churches in Zell, Kaimt, Corray, Merl and Pünderich. After the convent was dissolved in 1515 by Archbishop Richard von Greiffenklau, the nuns, under protest, had to move to “Mullay”, a forlorn dwelling diagonally across the river from Burg.

The likelihood is high that a parish had been established at Pünderich beginning in 1515. Confirming this is the church's building date, which can be reliably reckoned to be 1529. This church had a length of 59 Schuh (roughly 18.5 m) and a breadth of 43 Schuh (roughly 13.5 m). In 1766, a new church building was built on the old square by the master builder of the Springiersbach church, Paul Staehling, for 2,400 Reichsthaler; in the same year a sacristy was built onto it for 140 Reichsthaler. Only nine years later, however, the church was falling into disrepair, and building director Johann Seiz was commissioned to examine the building. He suggested replacing the vaulting, which he found to be too flat and too weak, with a wooden ceiling and improvements to the roof frame. These things were done by the following year, and the churchtower was also built higher. The church that stands today is from 1766, as shown on the lintel above the lefthand entrance door. The church's dimensions are some 25 ×11 m. The three-sided quire faces the east. The original entrance with formerly purely Gothic jambs is now glazed to make room for a spiral stairway up to the gallery. Today, entry is through two side doors in the porch.

=== 16th to 18th century ===
In the 16th and 17th centuries, Pünderich townsmen were said to be among the wealthiest on the Moselle. According to the 1652 taxation roll, Pünderich had 56 winepressing centres, which said a good deal about the state of winegrowing in the municipality.

In the Thirty Years' War, Pünderich had to fight Spaniards (1625) and Swedes (1632). In the 20th century, small finds from this time were unearthed. Pünderich did not suffer as badly from the Plague, which first appeared in the village in 1597, as some other places. The “Black Death” is estimated to have claimed 25 million lives, or roughly one third of Europe's population. It wiped out whole villages and great swathes of land and had a profound effect on mediaeval people's view of the world, and on economic life. The high point in the Plague's ravages in Briedel/Pünderich came between June/July 1635 and late August 1636. Pünderich lost only 5.3% of its population. The losses were far worse in some nearby places (Briedel 26%; Zell 27.3%; Kaimt 36.2%; Alf 36.6%; Bremm 55%; Ediger 44.2%). The Plague wrought particular havoc in the Cochemer Krampen, a 24-kilometre-long stretch of the Moselle made up of many winding bows beginning downstream of Pünderich at Bremm, and running downstream from there to just beyond Cochem.

There was also another loss during the French occupation later in the same century: during the war, the French razed the wall girding the village, as they did with all fortifications along the Moselle between 1683 and 1685, so that now only parts of it can be made out. It had stood for almost three centuries.

The French also forced the locals to supply building materials, livestock and their labour in the years from 1687 to 1692 so that the French could build their fort, Mont Royal. Up to 8,000 workers were forced into this. The fort could house 22,000 soldiers and 3,000 horses. The French only withdrew after the Treaty of Ryswick (Rijswijk) had been signed in 1697, ending the Nine Years' War (known in Germany as the Pfälzischer Erbfolgekrieg, or War of the Palatine Succession). All together, Pünderichers had had to put up with almost 80 years of occupation in the 17th century.

The year 1784 wrought catastrophe throughout Europe, and brought the river Moselle its greatest ever flood. On 9 February 1784, Pünderich's lower village was particularly gravely stricken. After the frightful ice flows from 24 to 26 February, the Moselle's waters rose until on 29 February, the flood reached the high water mark set in the 1740 flood, eventually exceeding it by three Schuh (roughly a metre). The flood also deposited sediments in many places, causing lasting problems.

Beginning in 1794, Pünderich, which had until now been ruled by the Electorate of Trier, lay under French rule. In 1814 it was assigned to the Kingdom of Prussia at the Congress of Vienna.

In the latter half of the 19th century, agricultural life was marked by bad harvests and famines, prompting many to turn their backs on the village and emigrate to North America or Brazil. This hit Pünderich hard, shrinking its population from just under 800 to roughly 300, as just under 500 people left between 1850 and 1900.

=== 20th century ===
The earlier half of the 20th century was characterized in Pünderich, as it was everywhere, by the world wars. In the First World War, 35 soldiers from Pünderich fell. In the Second World War, losses totalled 61. Because of the railway lines, Pünderich was targeted several times for aerial bombing. Since 1946, Pünderich has been part of the then newly founded state of Rhineland-Palatinate.

In the 1950s, Pünderich underwent a profound change. Agricultural activities such as cropraising and livestock raising yielded to winegrowing. Tourists began coming, and the municipality opened a campground. By the mid-1960s, old barns and storehouses were being turned into guest accommodations. There was a further building boom in the late 20th century which brought holiday homes.

Under the Verwaltungsvereinfachungsgesetz (“Administration Simplification Law”) of 18 July 1970, with effect from 7 November 1970, the municipality was grouped into the Verbandsgemeinde of Zell. In 1984, the municipality was awarded the title “Prettiest Village in the Regierungsbezirk of Koblenz”.

== Politics ==
=== Municipal council ===
The council is made up of 12 council members, who were elected by majority vote at the municipal election held on 7 June 2009, and the honorary mayor as chairman.

=== Mayor ===
Pünderich's mayor is Rainer Nilles.

=== Coat of arms ===
The municipality's arms might be described thus: Gules two bendlets surmounting two bendlets sinister Or.

== Culture and sightseeing ==
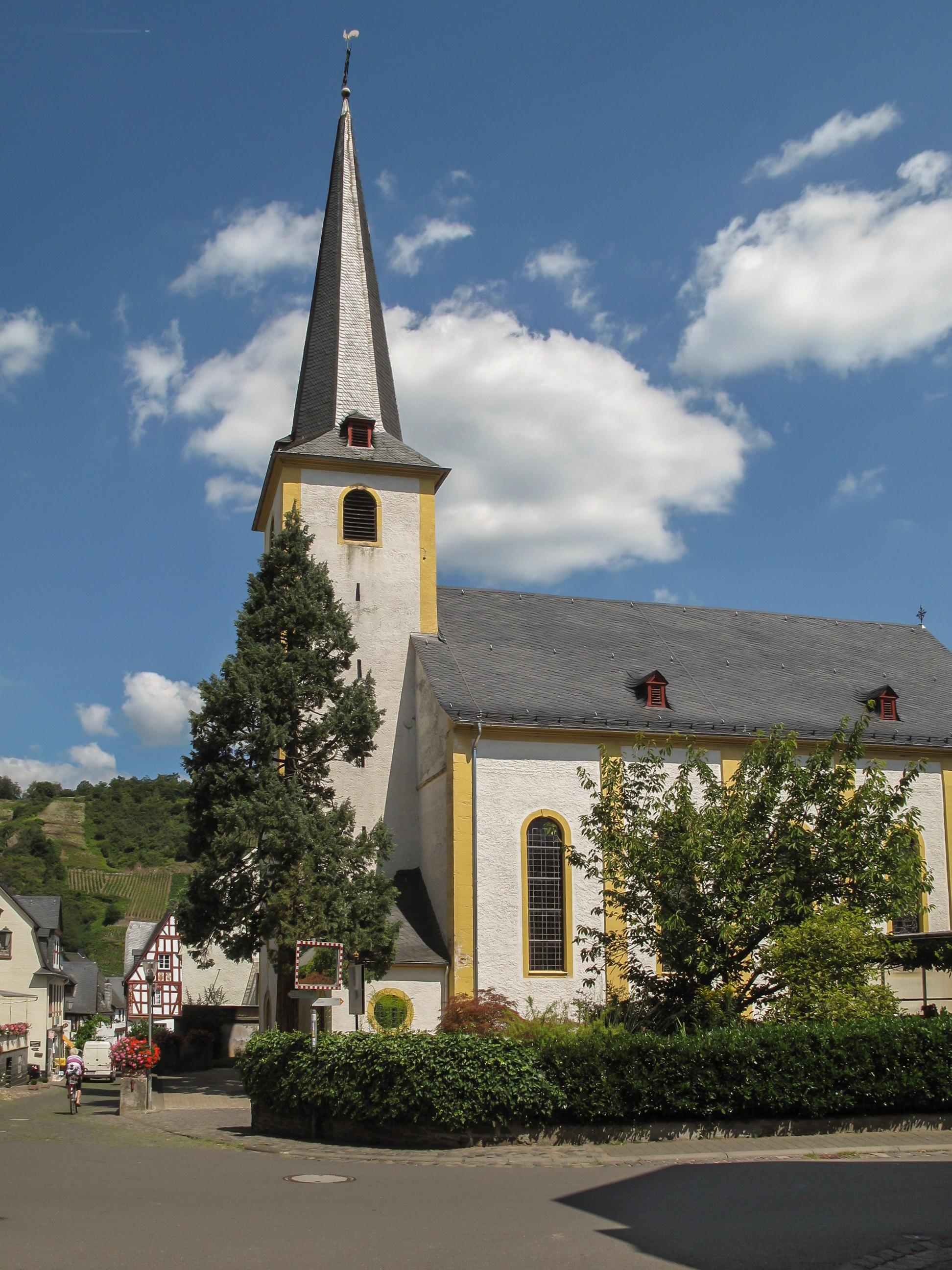
Kirchstraße: Saint Mark the Evangelist's Catholic Parish Church

=== Buildings ===
The following are listed buildings or sites in Rhineland-Palatinate’s Directory of Cultural Monuments:

- Graveyard, Hauptstraße – Chapel to Our Lady of Sorrows (Kapelle zur schmerzhaften Muttergottes); aisleless church, marked 1612, in the steep gable a Baroque Madonna; coat of arms of Elector of Trier Lothar von Metternich (1599-1623); Assumption of Mary, before which a modern Bildstock with Crucifixion relief, 18th or 19th century
- Saint Mark the Evangelist’s Catholic Parish Church (Pfarrkirche St. Markus Evangelist), Kirchstraße – Baroque aisleless church, marked 1766, architect Paul Stehling (or Stähling), Strasbourg, adjustments by Johann Seiz; old churchyard wall; whole complex
- Bahnhofstraße 2 – former school; quarrystone building, early 20th century
- Bahnhofstraße 4 – quarrystone building, partly timber-frame, half-hipped roof, Swiss chalet style, about 1900/1910; whole complex
- Brunnenstraße 3 – quarrystone building, old measuring standards and office for calibrating barrels, centre for weights and measures
- Eltzerstraße 1 – timber-frame house, partly solid, 18th century
- Eltzerstraße 5 – timber-frame house, partly solid, early 18th century
- Eltzerstraße 7 – timber-frame house, partly solid, marked 1603 (possibly a conversion), essentially possibly from the 16th century
- Eltzerstraße 19 – Eltzer Hof; late mediaeval plastered building, 16th or 17th century; one-floor timber-frame barn
- Hauptstraße – Alter Friedhof (“Old Graveyard”); warriors’ memorial, chapel with relief; graveyard cross, marked 1895
- Hauptstraße 30 – quarrystone villa, about 1900/1910, in the back considerably older timber-frame house, plastered
- Hauptstraße 33 – winemaker's villa; building with mansard roof, about 1910, cellar/winepress house with Expressionist gable; whole complex
- Hauptstraße 63 – old school (?); quarrystone building, latter half of the 19th century
- Hauptstraße 65 – winemaker's house; quarrystone building, early 20th century
- Hauptstraße 68 – villa with several wings; Baroque Revival plastered building, 1910/1915; second plastered building, mansard roof; whole complex of buildings with garden
- Kirchstraße 3 – timber-frame house, partly solid, mansard roof, 18th century; whole complex of buildings with garden
- Kirchstraße 6 – Baroque door, marked 1716
- Kirchstraße 10/12 – timber-frame house, partly solid or plastered, essentially from the 18th century
- Kirchstraße 13 – two-winged timber-frame house, partly solid, balloon frame, half-hipped roof, essentially possibly from the latter half of the 16th century; timber-frame house meeting it at right angle, partly solid, 17th or 18th century
- Kirchstraße 16 – timber-frame house, partly solid, marked 1517 and 1631 (addition); meeting it a solid building, possibly older
- Kirchstraße 18 – building with half-hipped roof, 17th century
- Kirchstraße 21 – timber-frame house, partly solid, plastered, hipped roof, 18th century; adjoining timber-frame house, plastered, 18th century
- Kirchstraße 22 – timber-frame house, partly solid, plastered, partly slated, essentially from the 17th or 18th century
- Kirchstraße 23 – three-floor timber-frame house, partly solid, half-hipped roof, marked 1602 and 1663
- Kirchstraße 24 – timber-frame house, partly solid, latter half of the 17th century; in the back timber-frame house, 18th or 19th century
- Kirchstraße 30 – three-floor timber-frame house, partly solid, marked 1715
- Kirchstraße 33 – relief, 18th century
- Kirchstraße 37 – two-winged timber-frame house, partly solid, marked 1663, likelier to be from the early 18th century, and reconstructed after 1949
- Marienburgerstraße 4 – three-floor timber-frame house, partly solid, plastered, 18th or 19th century
- Marienburgerstraße 7 – timber-frame house, partly solid, early 18th century
- Marienburgerstraße 8 – timber-frame house, partly solid, mansard roof, 18th century, ground-floor pelmets from the 19th century
- Marienburgerstraße 13 – Altes Rathaus (“Old Town Hall”); three-floor timber-frame house, partly solid, balloon frame, stairway, dendrochronologically dated to 1548
- Marienburgerstraße 15 – timber-frame house, partly solid, half-hipped roof, marked 1623
- Marienburgerstraße 17 – timber-frame house, partly solid, marked 1596, likelier to be from the early 18th century; adjoining second timber-frame house
- Marienburgerstraße 18 – timber-frame house, partly solid, mansard roof, about 1800
- Marienburgerstraße 21 – timber-frame house, partly solid, plastered, 18th century; timber-frame barn, mansard roof
- Marienburgerstraße 22 – Baroque door
- Marienburgerstraße 23 – timber-frame house, partly solid, balloon frame, 16th century; three-floor timber-frame house, partly solid, half-hipped roof, late 17th century
- Marienburgerstraße 24 – Altes Fährhaus (“Old Ferryhouse”); three-floor timber-frame house, partly solid, marked 1621

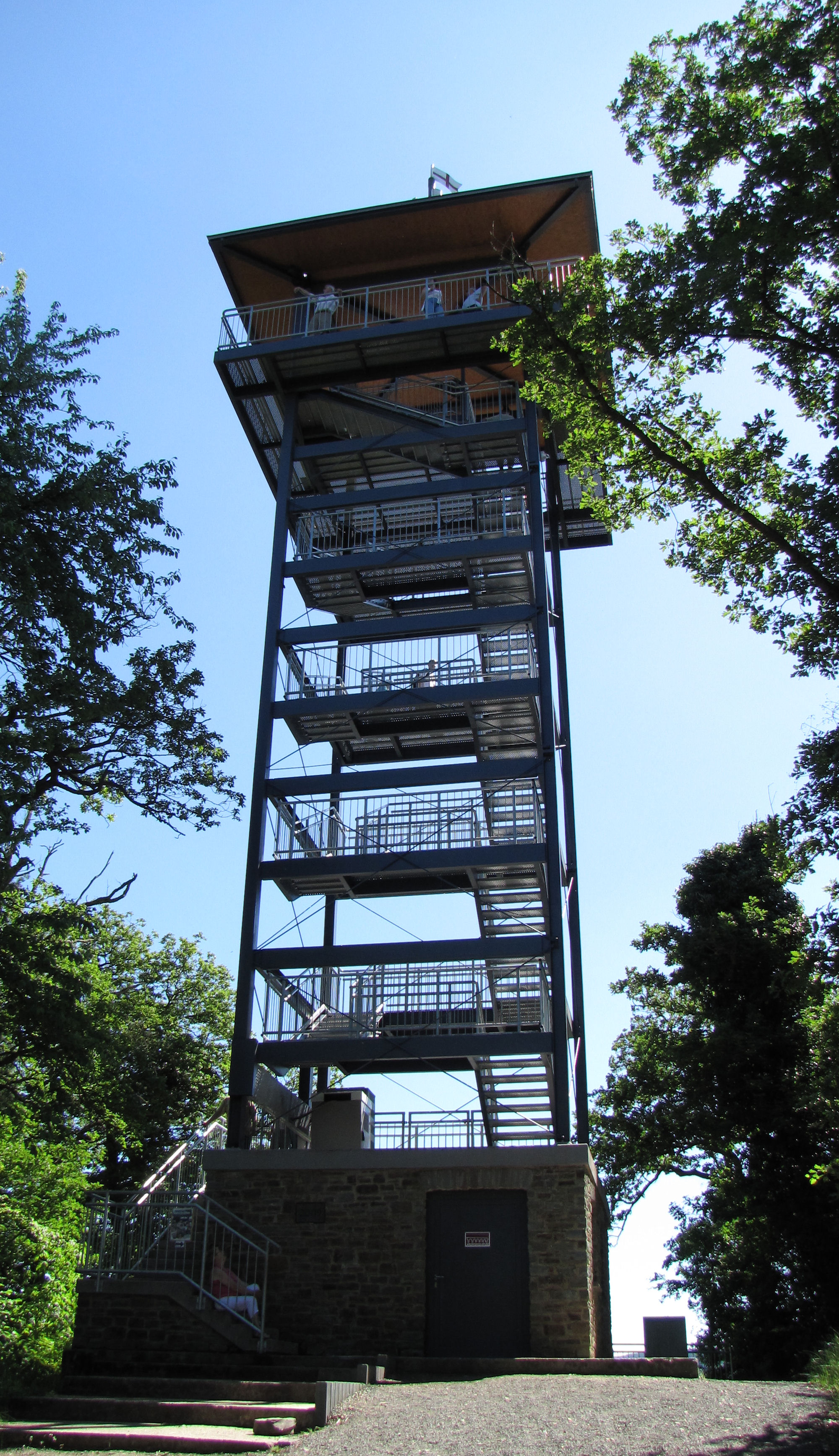
Lookout tower on the Prinzenkopf

- Rathausstraße – timber-frame house, partly solid, mansard roof, 18th or 19th century; hearth heating plate
- Rathausstraße 10 – building with mansard roof, possibly from the 18th century
- Rathausstraße 11 – timber-frame house, partly solid, marked 1617, timber framing on upper floor from the 17th century
- Rathausstraße 16 – timber-frame house, partly solid, Mansarddach, late 18th or early 19th century
- Rathausstraße 20 – timber-frame house, partly solid, mansard roof, marked 1722
- Rathausstraße 23 – timber-frame house, plastered, 18th century
- Römerstraße 15 – timber-frame house, partly solid, plastered, half-hipped roof, 17th or 18th century
- Springiersbacherstraße 1 – hipped mansard roof, Swiss chalet style, about 1910
- Springiersbacherstraße 27/29 – Springiersbacher Hof; big building with hipped roof, marked 1747 (coat of arms) and 1784
- Facing Pünderich across the Moselle – quarrystone building, inside, a wayside cross, 19th century
- In the vineyard across the Moselle from Pünderich – tunnel and Substructural walls of the Koblenz-Trier railway line.

Since the summer of 2008, the Altes Fährhaus – or Altes Fährhäuschen – has been used on sunnier weekends as an entry point to the village. It is open from May to October, weather permitting.

=== Other sites ===
Although not a listed site, the Marienburg is still worth seeing. It is also the local vineyard's namesake, and the 786 m-long railway slope viaduct, too, bears its name. This bridge is the longest of this type in Germany. There is also a lookout tower with an outstanding, broad view on the Prinzenkopf, a local mountain. The old wooden tower was torn down in September 2008, and the new steel one opened the following June.

=== Museums ===
Up from the church on Düppelstraße, the quarrystone Eichhäuschen – the building where measuring standards were enforced – still stands. Oaken wine barrels of all sizes were still being calibrated here up to 1981.

The barrel calibrating workshop is still equipped as such, just as it was in its heyday, but is now a museum. Towards the back stand two iron kettles, one measuring 1 200 L and the other 150 L. On the kettles are gauges. An old woodburning stove served to heat the branding iron up until it was red-hot. Other tools of the craft can still be viewed today.

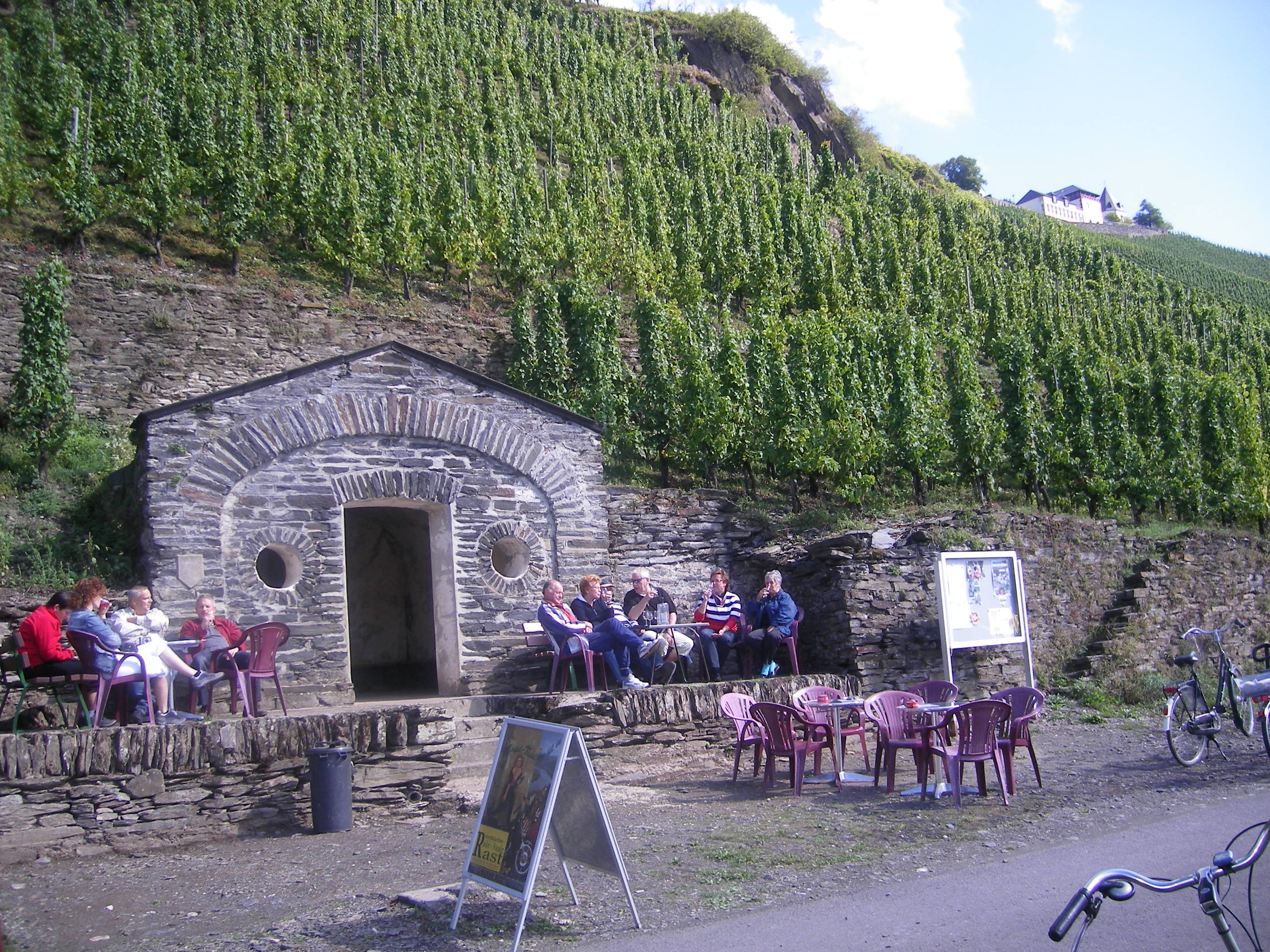
Altes Fährhäuschen

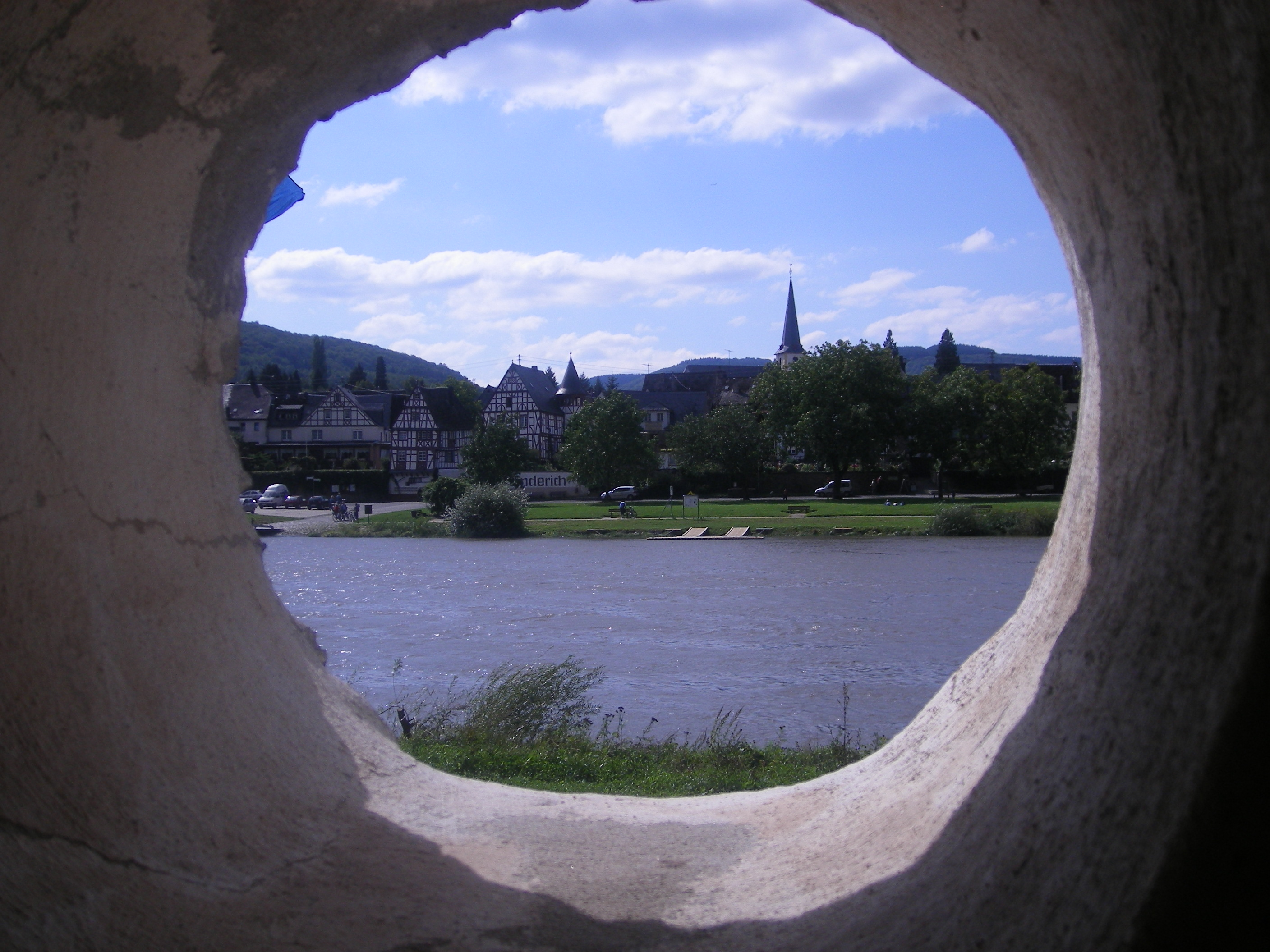
View from the Altes Fährhäuschen

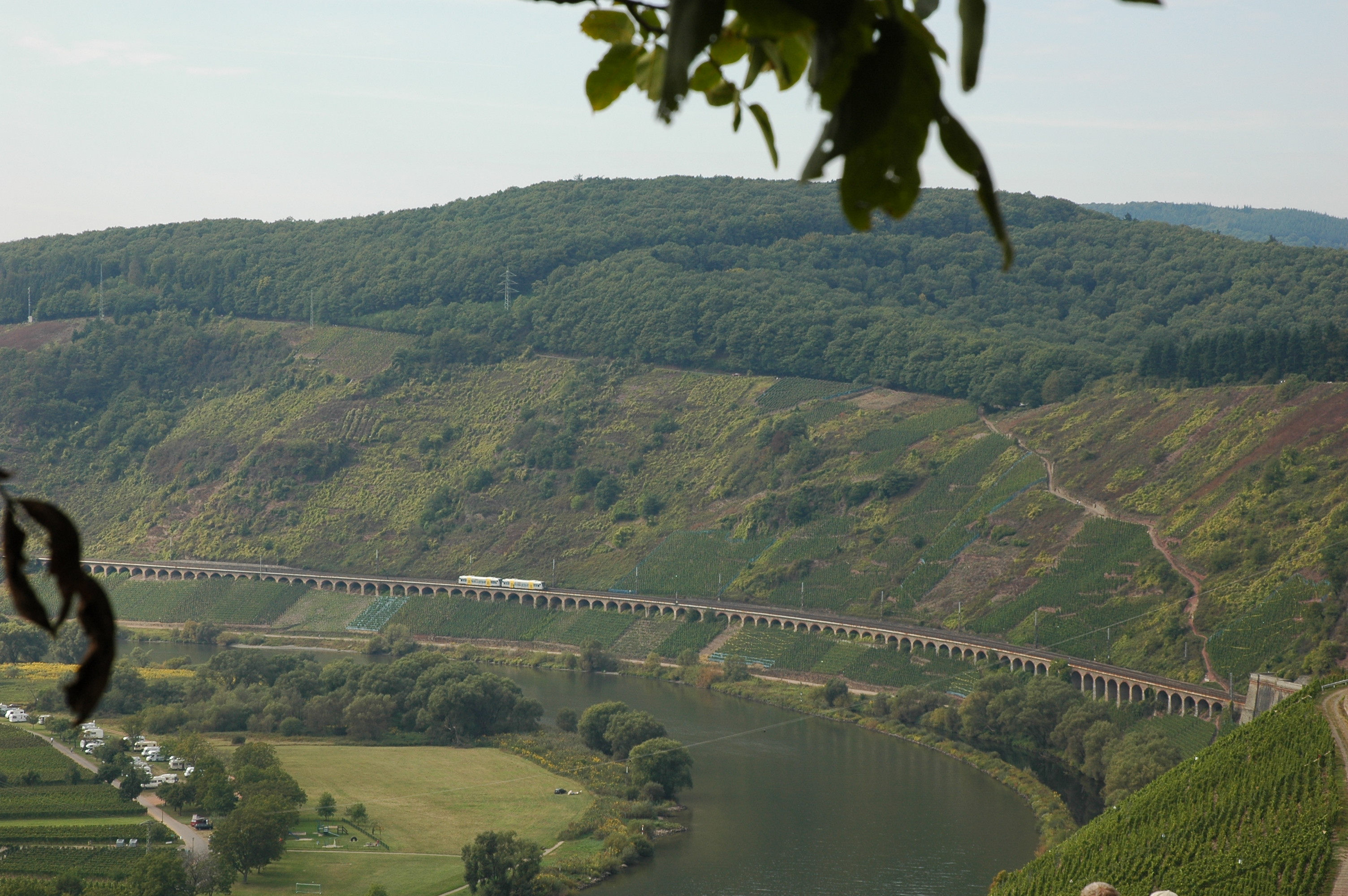
Pünderich slope viaduct

== Economy and infrastructure ==
=== Transport ===
Pünderich was linked to the railway network on 15 May 1880 when the Koblenz–Trier line opened. The station was not always economically viable, since it stood on the other side of the Moselle, but a boom came when the Moselle Valley Railway (Moseltalbahn) was built. It opened on 20 August 1905. Two days earlier, the postal coach service had been suspended. Local people affectionately called this railway the Saufbähnchen (roughly “Little Guzzling Railway”). Pünderich had two railway stations at this time. It now has none. The Saufbähnchen was closed in 1960, although the station still stands in the village, and the other one fell victim to electrification in 1974.

Ferries have long been running in Pünderich. The municipality acquired its first ferry, made from wood, in 1879, but this was cast aside in 1896 in favour of a new iron ferryboat (locals were amazed that an iron boat could float). Early in 1940, Pünderich secured a bigger ferry, this one a reaction ferry. It was, however, motorized in 1963/1964, but this was technically outdated by 1974. The municipality was therefore obliged to obtain a cable-free ferry. This was converted in the 1990s, and is still in service today.

=== Economy ===
Pünderich's main livelihood is still winegrowing (mainly Riesling), followed by tourism. Over the last few years, many modern guest accommodations have been built. Pünderich is a popular holiday destination, partly because it is among the few places on the Moselle whose riverfront is cut off by neither a road nor a railway. There are also campgrounds and caravan parks.

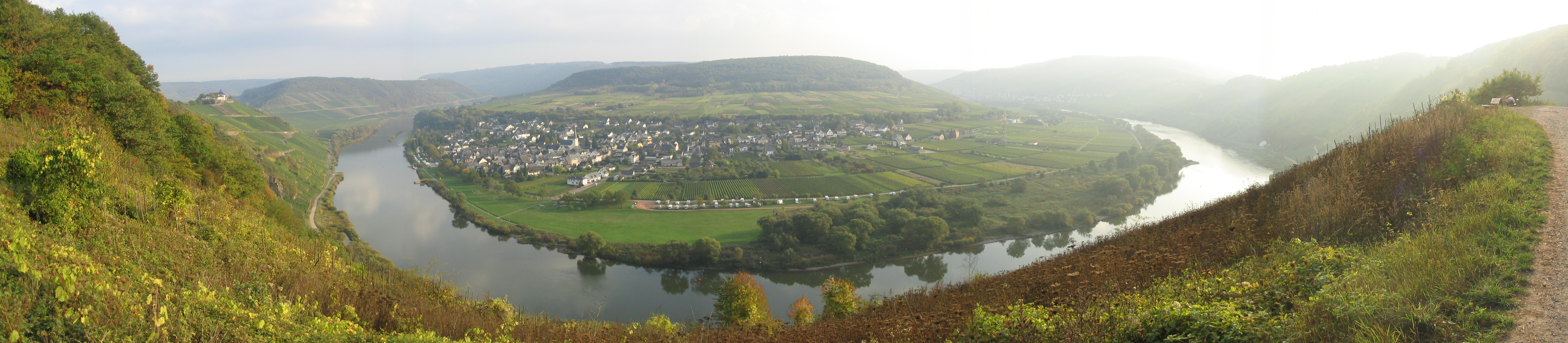
Pünderich; at left, the Marienburg
