= Zell (Mosel) =

- Town
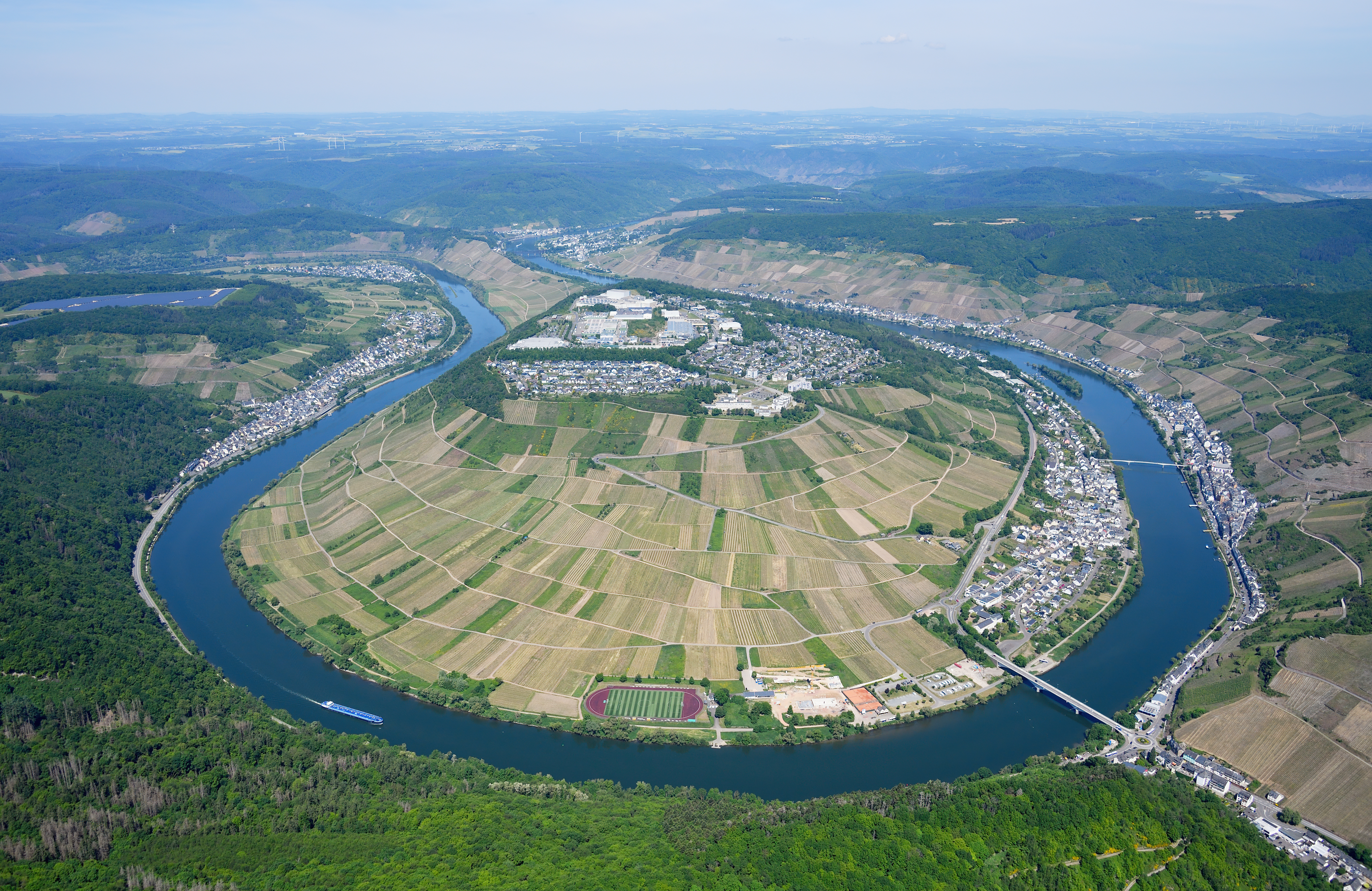
- Aerial view of Zell an der Mosel

- Coat of arms

- Location of Zell within Cochem-Zell district
- Interactive map of Zell
- Location within Germany Location within Rhineland-Palatinate
- Coordinates: 50°01′39″N 7°10′53″E
- Country: Germany
- State: Rhineland-Palatinate
- District: Cochem-Zell
- Municipal assoc.: Zell (Mosel)
- Subdivisions: 5

Government
  - Mayor (2019–24): Hans-Peter Döpgen (FW)

Area
  - Total: 44.95 km^{2} (17.36 sq mi)
- Elevation: 100 m (330 ft)

Population (2025-12-31)
  - Total: 4,019
  - Density: 89.41/km^{2} (231.6/sq mi)
- Time zone: UTC+01:00 (CET)
  - Summer (DST): UTC+02:00 (CEST)
- Postal codes: 56856
- Dialling codes: 06542
- Vehicle registration: COC, ZEL
- Website: www.zellmosel.de

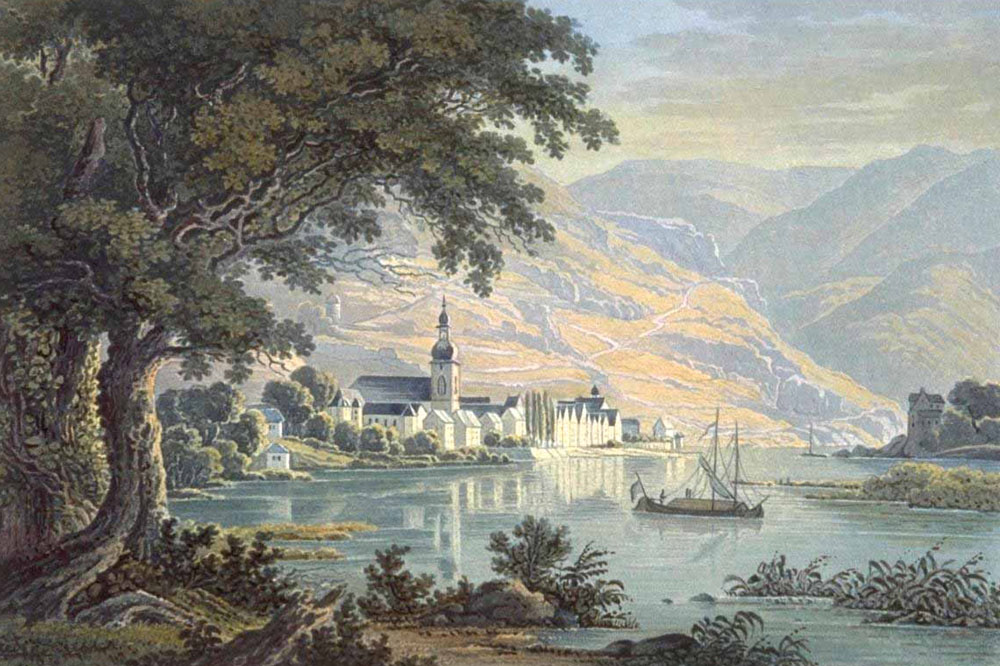
Zell an der Mosel in 1841

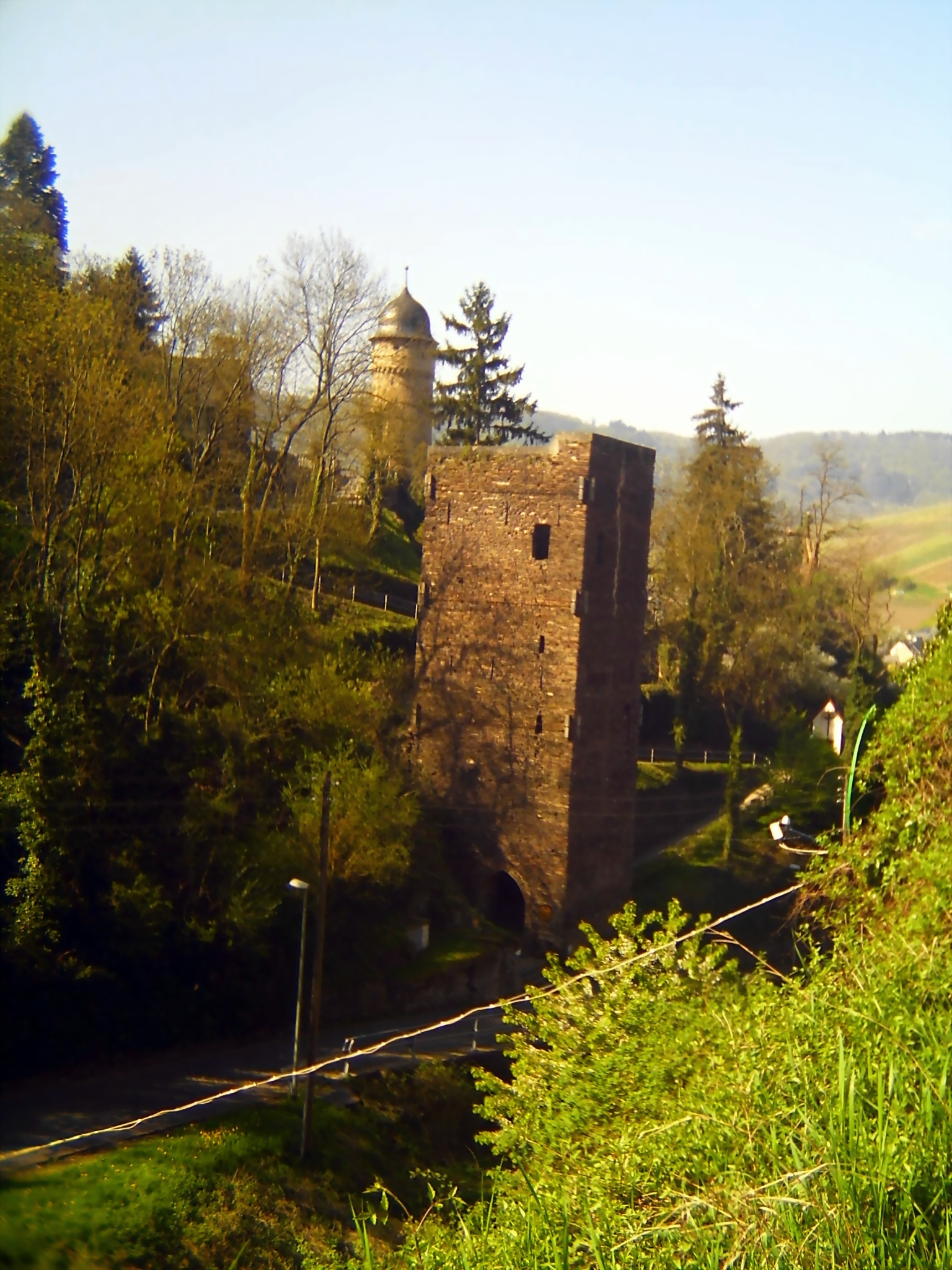
Pulverturm and Viereckiger Turm

Zell (Mosel) (German pronunciation: [tsɛl]) is a town in the Cochem-Zell district in Rhineland-Palatinate, Germany. Zell has roughly 4,300 inhabitants and is the seat of the like-named Verbandsgemeinde.

== Geography ==
=== Location ===
Zell is an hour's drive from both Koblenz and Trier, more or less halfway between these two cities. The nearest town going towards Koblenz is Cochem, and the nearest two going towards Trier are Traben-Trarbach and Bernkastel-Kues. To both Frankfurt-Hahn Airport on the Hunsrück and the spa town of Bad Bertrich in the Voreifel it is half an hour's drive. The parts of town lying on the river, the Old Town, Kaimt and Merl, are at an elevation of roughly 100 m above sea level on a remarkable bow in the river Moselle, known as the Zeller Hamm.

=== Constituent communities ===
On the Moselle's right bank lie the Old Town (Altstadt) and the Stadtteil of Merl. Up in the Hunsrück lies the smallest Stadtteil, Althaus, which is right at the town limit, next to Tellig. West of the Moselle, in a dale, lies Kaimt, as does Barl, whose elevation is 100 m higher.

== History ==
Zell was founded by the Romans sometime later than AD 70. The outlying centre of Kaimt had its first documentary mention in 732 or 733. In 1222, Zell was granted town rights. Beginning in 1332, it was an Electoral-Trier town and until 1794 the seat of an Electoral-Trier Oberamt. With the occupation of the Rhine's left bank by French Revolutionary troops in 1794, the town became French. In 1814 Zell was assigned to the Kingdom of Prussia at the Congress of Vienna. Fires in 1848 and 1857 destroyed a great deal of the Old Town. Since 1946, the town has been part of the then newly founded state of Rhineland-Palatinate. In 1950 came the amalgamation of Kaimt. Until 1969, Zell was the district seat of the now abolished district of the same name. In the course of administrative restructuring in Rhineland-Palatinate, this was merged with the neighbouring district to form the district of Cochem-Zell, whose seat is at Cochem. Along with the loss of the district seat also came the loss of many other centres of authority and various other institutions. On 7 June 1969 came the amalgamation of Merl. The town has also distinguished itself with the establishment of many businesses, particularly in the outlying centre of Barl up in the heights.

== Politics ==
=== Town council ===
The local council has 20 members. The elections in May 2014 showed the following results.

Election	SPD	CDU	Wählergruppe FWG	Total
2014	4	11	5	20 Seats
2009	4	11	5	20 Seats
2004	4	11	5	20 Seats

- FWG = Freie Wählergruppe Stadt Zell e.V.

=== Mayor ===
Zell's mayor is Hans-Peter Döpgen (FWG).

=== Coat of arms ===
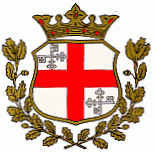
Coat of arms

The town's arms might be described thus: Argent a cross gules, in dexter chief two keys per cross, the wards turned outwards and to chief and dexter azure, and in sinister base the same reversed.

The red cross refers to the town's historical relation with the Archbishop of Trier and the Elector of Trier. The keys are Saint Peter's attribute, thus representing the town's and the church's patron saint. Also, there once stood on the Petersberg (mountain, now called Marienburg) a church consecrated to Saint Peter.

=== Town partnerships ===
Zell fosters partnerships with the following places:

- Crépy-en-Valois, Oise, France
- Antoing, Hainaut, Belgium
- (Germany) Triptis, Saale-Orla-Kreis, Thuringia

== Culture and sightseeing ==
=== Theatre ===
Theatre group Kätz

=== Museums ===
The town hall houses a local history museum with many exhibits from the town's history, winegrowing and traditional crafts.

=== Buildings ===
The following are listed buildings or sites in Rhineland-Palatinate's Directory of Cultural Monuments:

==== Zell (main centre) ====
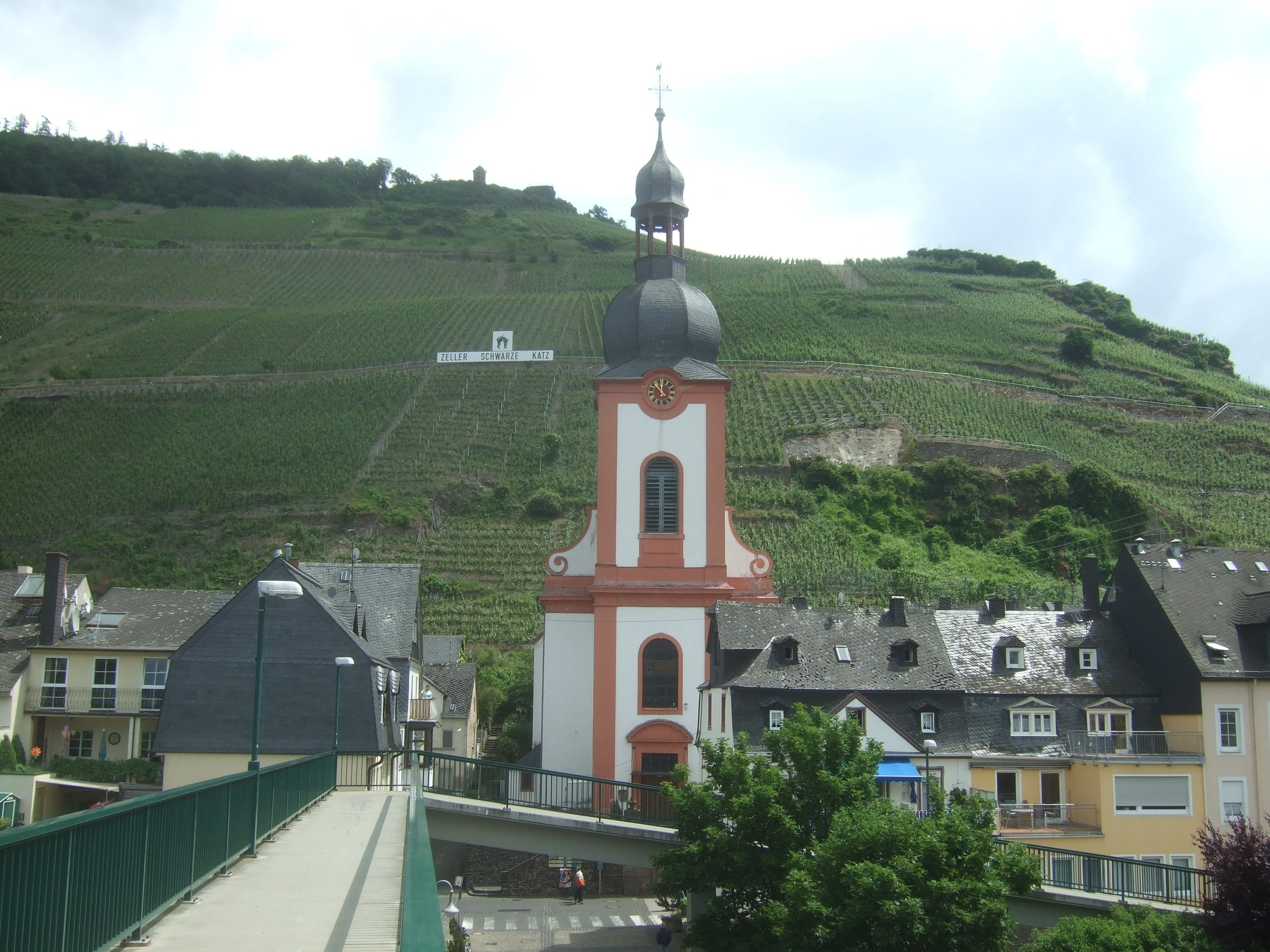
Zell (Mosel), Balduinstraße: Katholische Kirche St. Peter und Paul

- Saint Peter's and Saint Paul's Catholic Church (Kirche St. Peter und Paul), Balduinstraße – aisleless church, 1786-1792
- Town Wall – six-floor "Bachturm" (tower), converted to a gate tower in 1899, inside the tower a Heiligenhäuschen (a small, shrinelike structure consecrated to a saint or saints), pietà, 18th century; before the tower a graveyard: wayside cross marked 1741, three grave crosses marked 1632, 1643 and 1805 as well as three-floor "Pulverturm" (tower), "tail cupola" after 1689; on Hauptstraße remnants of a gateway arch
- Am Bahnhof 1 – old railway station; building with half-hipped roof, partly timber-frame, one-floor timber-frame additions, tower, about 1900
- At Balduinstraße 23 – richly sculpted portal walls, about 1910
- Balduinstraße 32 – three-floor plastered building, 1849, with nine Late Gothic tracery windows
- Balduinstraße 44 – Town Hall (Rathaus); two-winged brick building, corner tower, 1881
- Balduinstraße 69 – three-floor Gothic Revival plastered building, about 1900
- Balduinstraße 105 – three-floor Late Historicist plastered building, Romanesque Revival and Baroque Revival, about 1910
- Brandenburg 32 – brick villa with hipped roof, Renaissance Revival, 1896–1897
- At Corray 4 – headsman's cross, marked 1782
- Before Corray 13 – Johannesbrunnen (fountain)
- Corray 20 – Late Historicist brick building, partly timber-frame, mansard roof, about 1900
- Corray 51 – plastered building, about 1910/20
- Cuxborn 8 – three-floor timber-frame house, partly solid, plastered, marked 1770; pietà
- Jakobstraße – Old Graveyard (Alter Friedhof): cross, 19th century; whole complex
- Marktstraße/corner of Balduinstraße – Schwarze Katz ("Black Cat") fountain; basalt, 1936
- Between Moselpromenade 29 and 33 – gatelike linking bridge; Baroque Revival plastered building, marked 1904/08
- Moselpromenade 34 – Electoral-Trier castle house; three-floor timber-frame and solid building, staircases, marked 1532, on the Moselle side three-floor solid building, 16th century
- At Römerstraße 48 – hearth heating plate, 15th century
- Römerstraße 64 – three-floor Late Historicist timber-frame house, partly solid, half-hipped roof, staircase tower, early 20th century
- Schloßstraße 8/10 – former palatial residence; Late Gothic two-winged building with polygonal corner turrets 1530-1542, architect possibly F. Kauffmann, expanded in 16th and 17th centuries; whole complex
- At Schloßstraße 10 – former synagogue; one-floor plastered building, marked 1849, Late Gothic portal
- Schloßstraße 12 – former post office; three-floor Expressionist building with half-hipped roof, staircase tower; on Jakobsstraße: plastered building, 1920s
- Schloßstraße 27 – Classicist plastered building, first fourth of the 19th century
- Schloßstraße 36 – finance office; four-floor plastered building, 1920s
- Schloßstraße 42 – former Kreishaus (district administration building); three-winged building, 1920/1930
- Schloßstraße 61 – former Evangelical rectory; Baroque Revival building with mansard roof, about 1910
- At Schloßstraße 71 – cast-iron coat of arms
- Graveyard (monumental zone) – Gothic Revival graveyard chapel, about 1900; Heiligenhäuschen, 19th or 20th century, Stations of the Cross, 18th century; two grave crosses, 18th century; warriors' memorial, 1920s; Family Fier's tomb, Gothic Revival pinnacle, 1882 and years following; Gothic Revival niche figure of Saint Peter
- Collisturm – brick lookout tower with cupola, about 1906

==== Kaimt ====
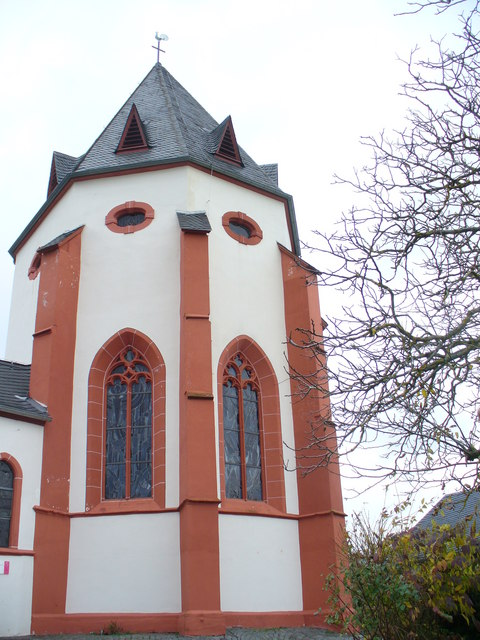
Kloster Marienburg

- Saint James the Greater's Catholic Parish Church (Pfarrkirche St. Jakobus Maior), Pfalzgasse 27 – Late Romanesque tower with Baroque portal
- Barlstraße 7 – timber-frame house, partly solid, balloon frame, half-hipped roof, late 16th century; timber-frame addition, 16th century
- Boos von Waldeck Straße 1 – Boos von Waldeck estate; timber-frame house, partly solid, balloon frame, marked 1551, portal 1620; at the side Baroque pavilion; barn; garden, wall with coat of arms; whole complex
- Klemensgasse 4 – timber-frame house, partly solid, 16th century
- Pfalzgasse 5 – timber-frame house, partly solid, possibly from the 16th century
- Plänterstraße – wayside chapel; inside, relief as well as Madonna, 18th century
- Near Plänterstraße 5 – wayside cross, marked 1731
- St. Maximinhof 1/2 – St. Maximin's Abbey estate; two-winged building with half-hipped roof, 18th century; coat of arms 1575; Abbots Matthias von Saarburg's and Willibald Schäfer's coats of arms; no. 2 portal, marked 166?, coat of arms
- Marienburg Convent (Kloster Marienburg) – Late Gothic quire, 14th century, exaggerated in Baroque style and expanded into a tower; ruin expanded again in 1952-1957
- Wayside chapel – brick aisleless church, marked 1886, wayside cross

==== Merl ====
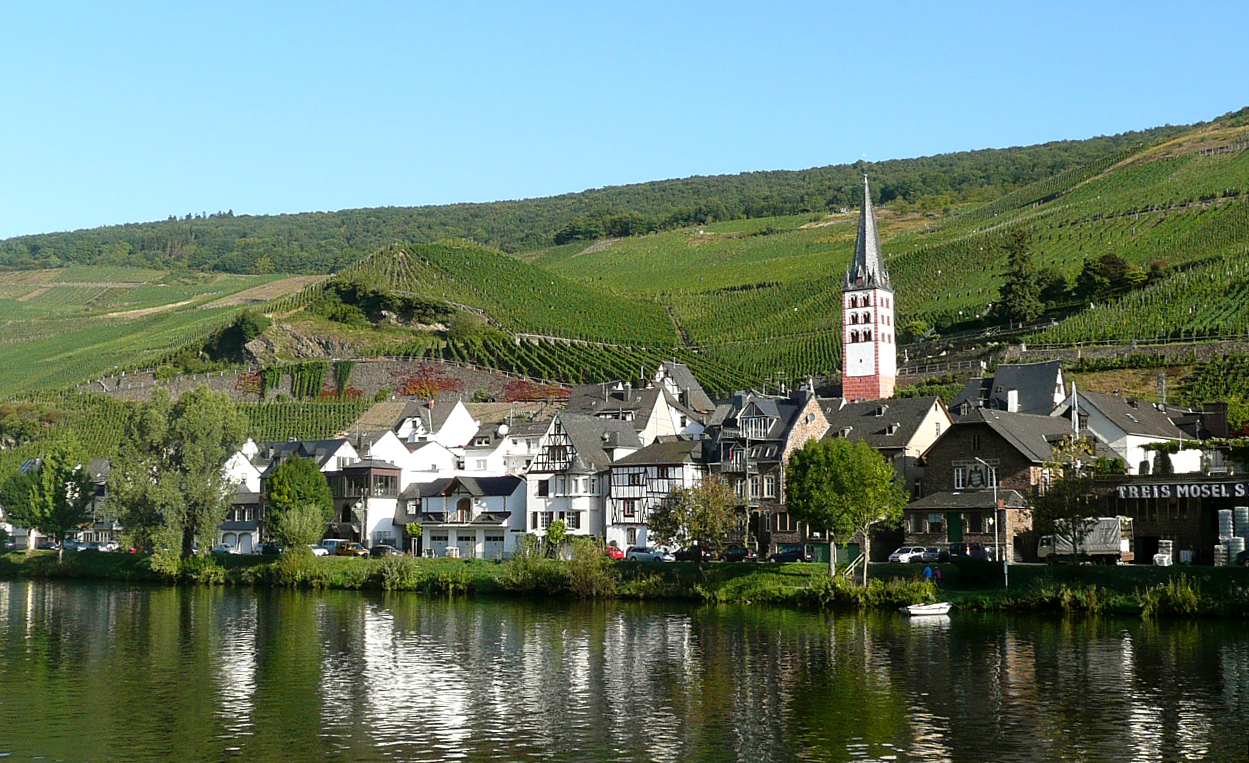
Merl view from the Mosel

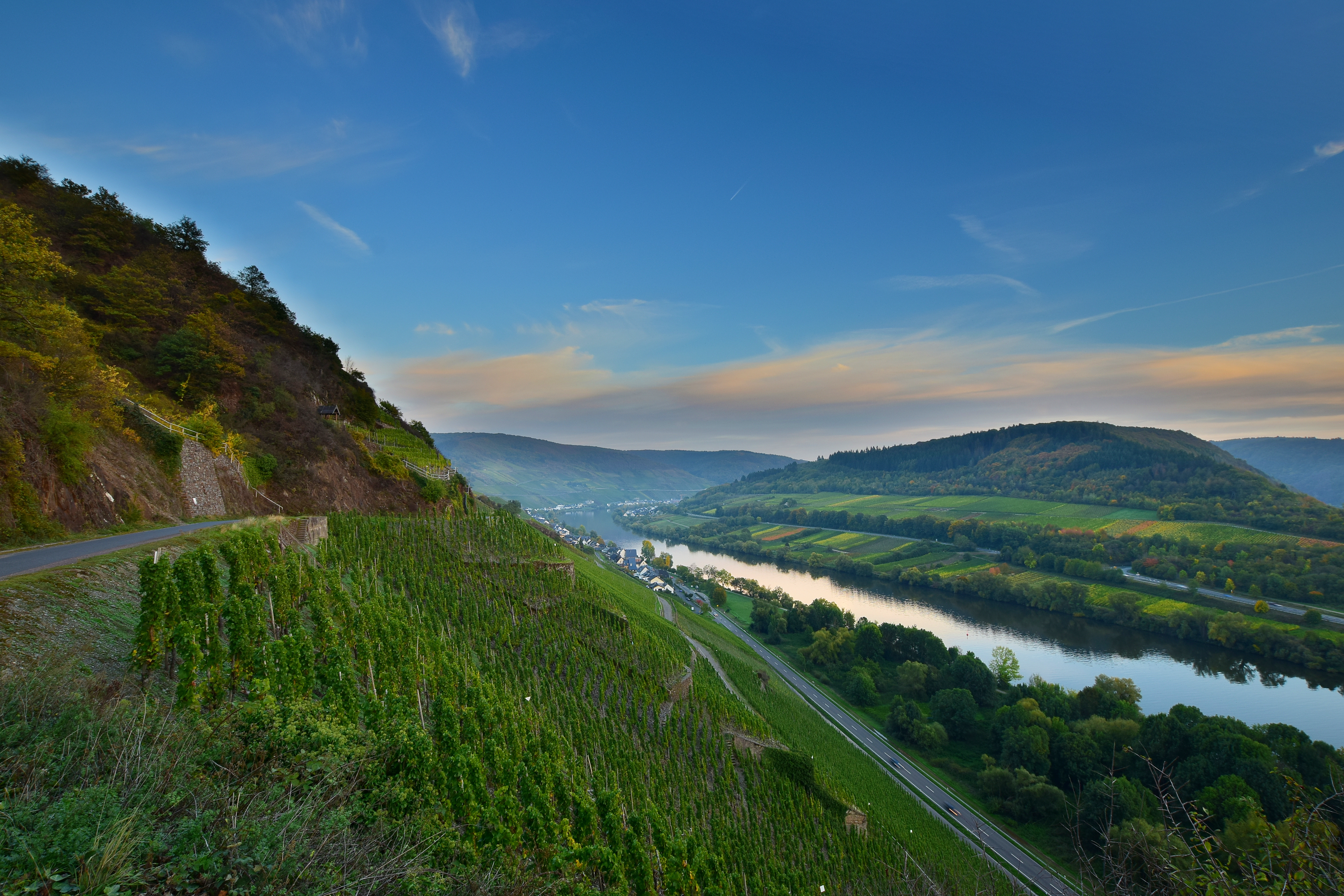
View from the Königslay Terrassen to the Mosel with Merl

- Former monastery (monumental zone), Klosterweg 4, 5, 7, 13–17 – Klosterweg 4: timber-frame house (plastered), half-hipped roof, essentially from the 16th century; Klosterweg 5, 7, 13–17 monastery buildings: west wing, Baroque building with mansard roof, Baroque portal; north wing: buildings with half-hipped roofs, essentially possibly from the 16th or 17th century, converted; east wing: oldest part with chapter house with tracery windows, above in the dormitory (?) crossbar windows; church (see next entry)
- Catholic Parish Church, Klosterweg – former church of the Conventual Franciscan monastery; aisleless church, late 13th century, marked 1490 and 1728 (conversions); outside: figure of Michael, figure of a Benedictine, Baroque tomb slab, missionary cross, 1863
- Alte Kirchgasse 1 – three-floor plastered building, partly timber-frame, Moselle style, about 1910
- Alte Kirchgasse 2 – three-floor timber-frame house, partly solid, balloon frame, 16th century; timber-frame addition, 18th century; in the back tower remnants
- Hauptstraße (no number) – railway station; quarrystone building, partly timber-frame, tower
- Hauptstraße 32 – timber-frame house, partly solid, balloon frame, dendrochronologically dated to 1478 ± 5 years; side wing, timber-frame, partly solid, crow-stepped gable, 16th century
- Hauptstraße 34 – timber-frame house, partly quarrystone, possibly from the 13th century, timber framing about 1480
- At Hauptstraße 44 – coat of arms, marked 1731
- Hauptstraße 52 – three-floor quarrystone building, hipped roof, mid 19th century
- In Spay 25 – Late Gothic timber-frame house, partly solid, plastered, half-hipped roof, marked 1518
- In Spay 48 – timber-frame house, partly solid, plastered, 16th or 17th century
- Kapellenweg 1 – timber-frame house, partly solid, 18th century
- Kirchkehr, Friedhof – Romanesque tower, five-floor plastered building, relief, 13th century; grave cross, 1886; cast-iron graveyard cross, 1863; whole complex
- Merlerstraße – Heiligenhäuschen, inside pietà, possibly from the 18th century
- Merlerstraße 24 – brick building, late 19th century
- Merlerstraße 45 – villa; quarrystone entrance loggia and corner oriel turret, Art Nouveau, early 20th century
- Pfarrgasse 1 – building with mansard roof, about 1910
- Ratsgasse 2 – building with hipped mansard roof, partly quarrystone and timber-frame, about 1900
- Rohrgasse 2 – three-floor timber-frame house, partly solid, balloon frame, dendrochronologically dated to 1542/1543
- Zandtstraße – Heiligenhäuschen; inside Late Gothic Man of Sorrows, 16th century
- Zandtstraße (no number) – new school; Baroque Revival plastered building, 1910/1920
- Zandtstraße (no number), Hauptstraße (no number) – three-floor building with hipped roof, marked 1767, essentially older; corner of Michaelsgasse: timber-frame house, partly solid, essentially from the 17th century; Hauptstraße 58/60: Sekt winery, quarrystone buildings, late 19th century, winery building, 20th century; commercial wing, quarrystone, 18th/19th century; timber-frame barn; whole complex
- Zandtstraße 17 – timber-frame house, partly solid, half-hipped roof, marked 1685 and 1686, timber-frame addition 18th century
- Zandtstraße 20 – building with mansard roof, 18th century, essentially possibly older
- Zandtstraße 21/Hauptstraße 38 – former Springiersbach (monastery) estate; Baroque plastered building, marked 1754; winery building, plastered building, 18th century; garden with pavilions; whole complex of buildings including new building on Hauptstraße
- Zandtstraße 46 – timber-frame house, plastered, 18th century, altered
- Zandtstraße 70 – residential tower; crow-stepped gable, apparently from 1328, remodelled in Baroque
- Zandtstraße 77/79 – so-called Klappenburg; former castle house, coats of arms of the Houses of Metzenhausen and of Leyen, marked 1720; three-floor solid building, staircase tower, corner oriel turret, essentially possibly from the 16th century; two-floor building with hipped mansard roof; whole complex
- Zandtstraße 82 – timber-frame house, partly solid, balloon frame, marked 1632, dendrochronologically dated to 1442/1443; whole complex
- Zandtstraße 90 – timber-frame house, partly solid, balloon frame, 16th century
- Zandtstraße 92/94 – timber-frame house, partly solid, balloon frame, 16th century
- Zandtstraße/corner of Klosterweg – old school; nine-axis quarrystone building; mid 19th century
- Way of the Cross with chapel, north of the village – Gothic Revival chapel; Stations with metal reliefs

=== Churches ===
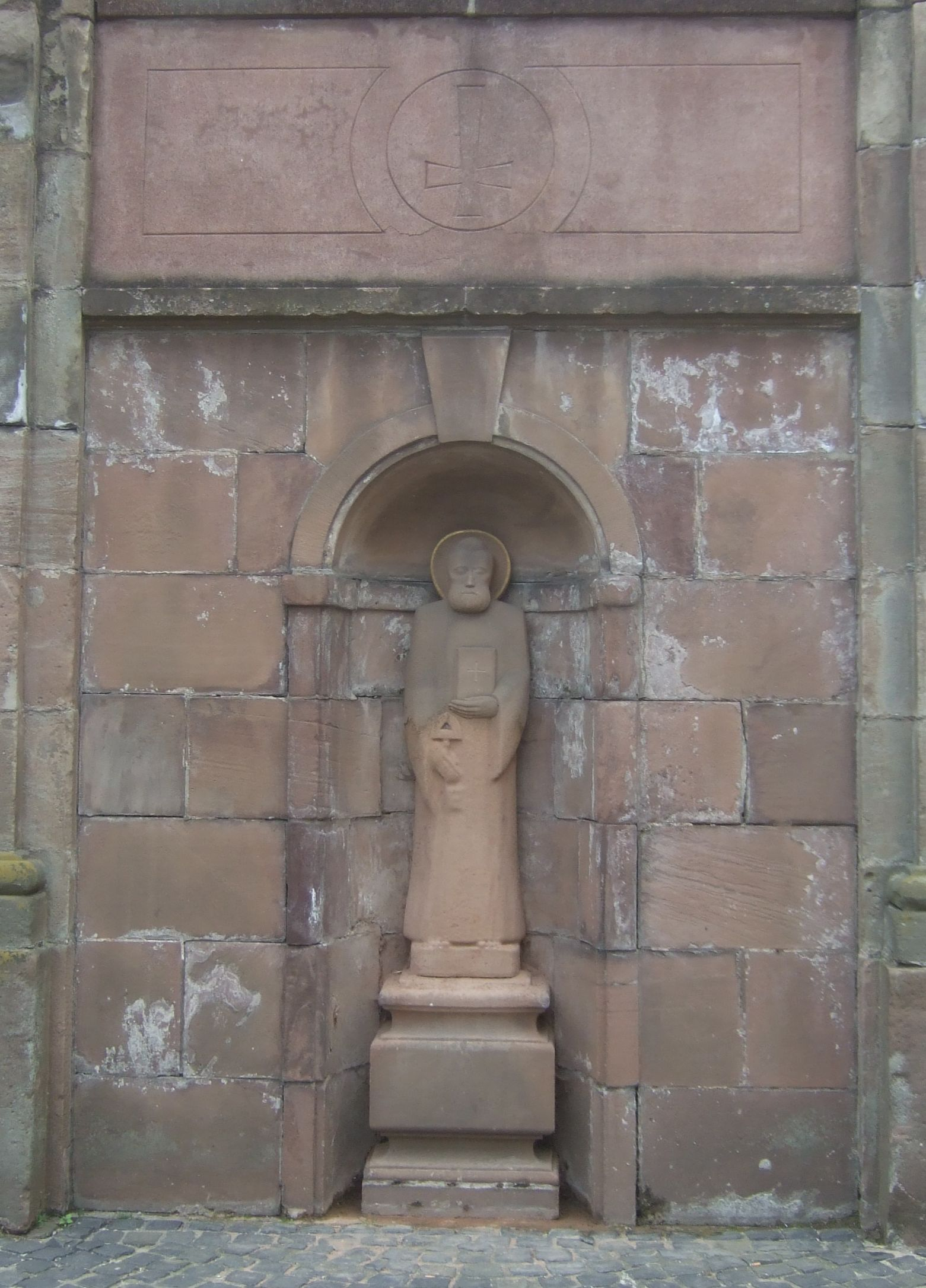
Statue of Saint Peter at Saint Peter's Church

Saint Peter's Catholic Parish Church in Zell has a reliquary shrine from the time between 1180 and 1190 from Limoges with a container for Saint Peter's bones. The Madonna figure in the left side altar comes from the 15th century. The baptismal font on the right side in the quire bears the year 1576. Saint Peter's has a High Altar and a Crucifixion group. A further point of note is an impressive baldachin much like the one at the Church of Our Lady (Liebfrauenkirche) in Trier.

In the outlying centre of Kaimt, the new parish church, Saint James's, was built about 1968; the old churchtower was preserved. It was the Palatine chapel of the former Electoral-Trier archiepiscopal estate in Kaimt. Inside is a stone endowment document, the oldest ecclesiastical attestation of the town of Zell, from about 1200, with the oldest depiction of a winemaker. There are a side altar and a tabernacle with a Christ torso from the 13th or 14th century, the time of transition from Romanesque to Gothic, probably of the Riemenschneider school.

In the outlying centre of Merl stands Saint Michael's Parish Church, until 1805 the Franciscan monastery church. The church on the thoroughfare near the Moselle has on the High Altar an "Antwerp retable" from about 1520. The sacristy was built with one support to a nearly square floor plan. In the parish hall, remnants of mediaeval wall paintings have been preserved, and the old dormitory's roof frame in the monastery wing, which is not open to the public, is said to be one of the few mediaeval roof constructions still preserved in Germany.

The old Romanesque Saint Michael's Parish Church, a hall church, was torn down in 1823 after the monastery church was taken over. The old Romanesque tower stood preserved on today's graveyard in Merl.

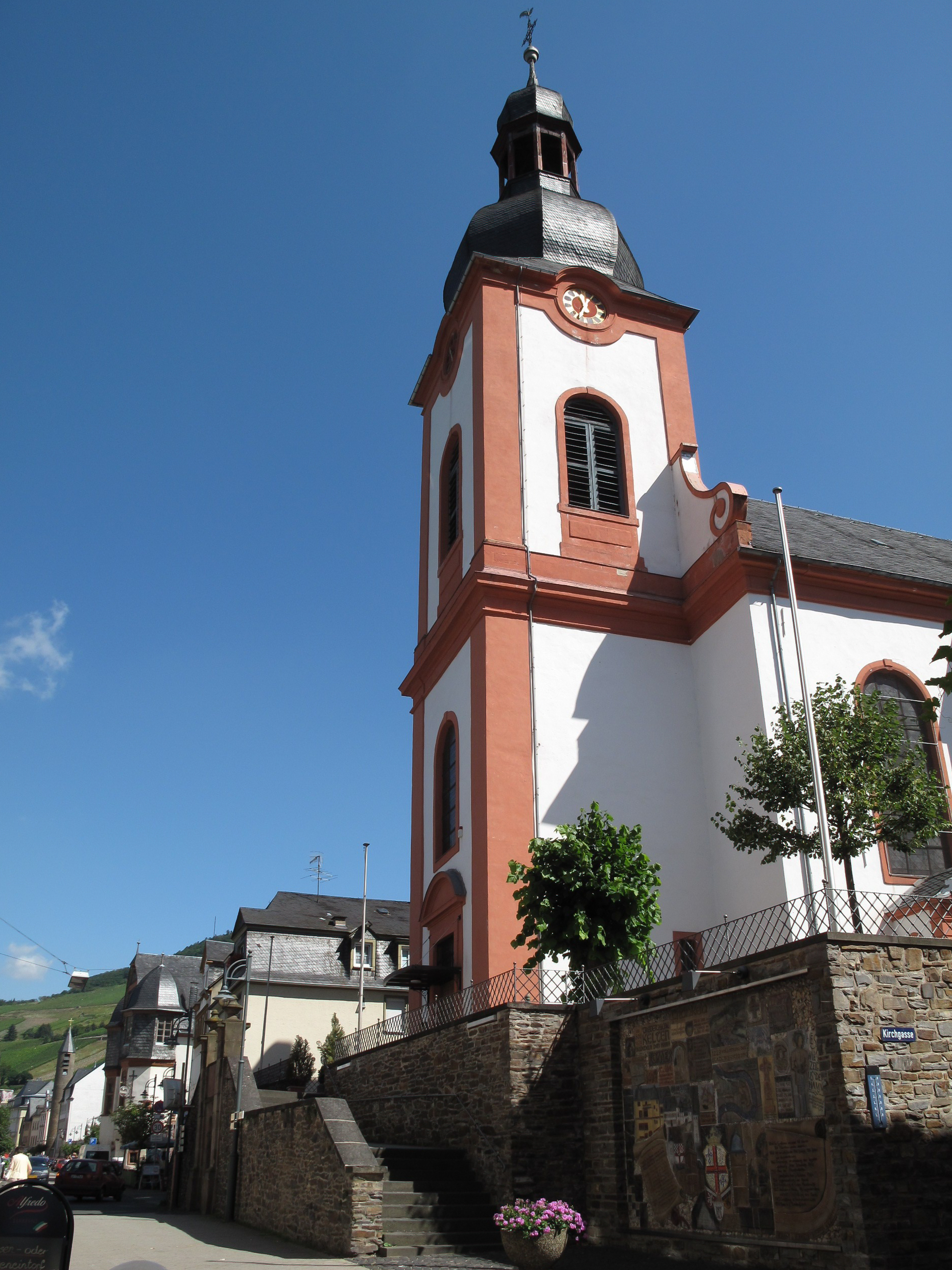
Zell-Mosel, church

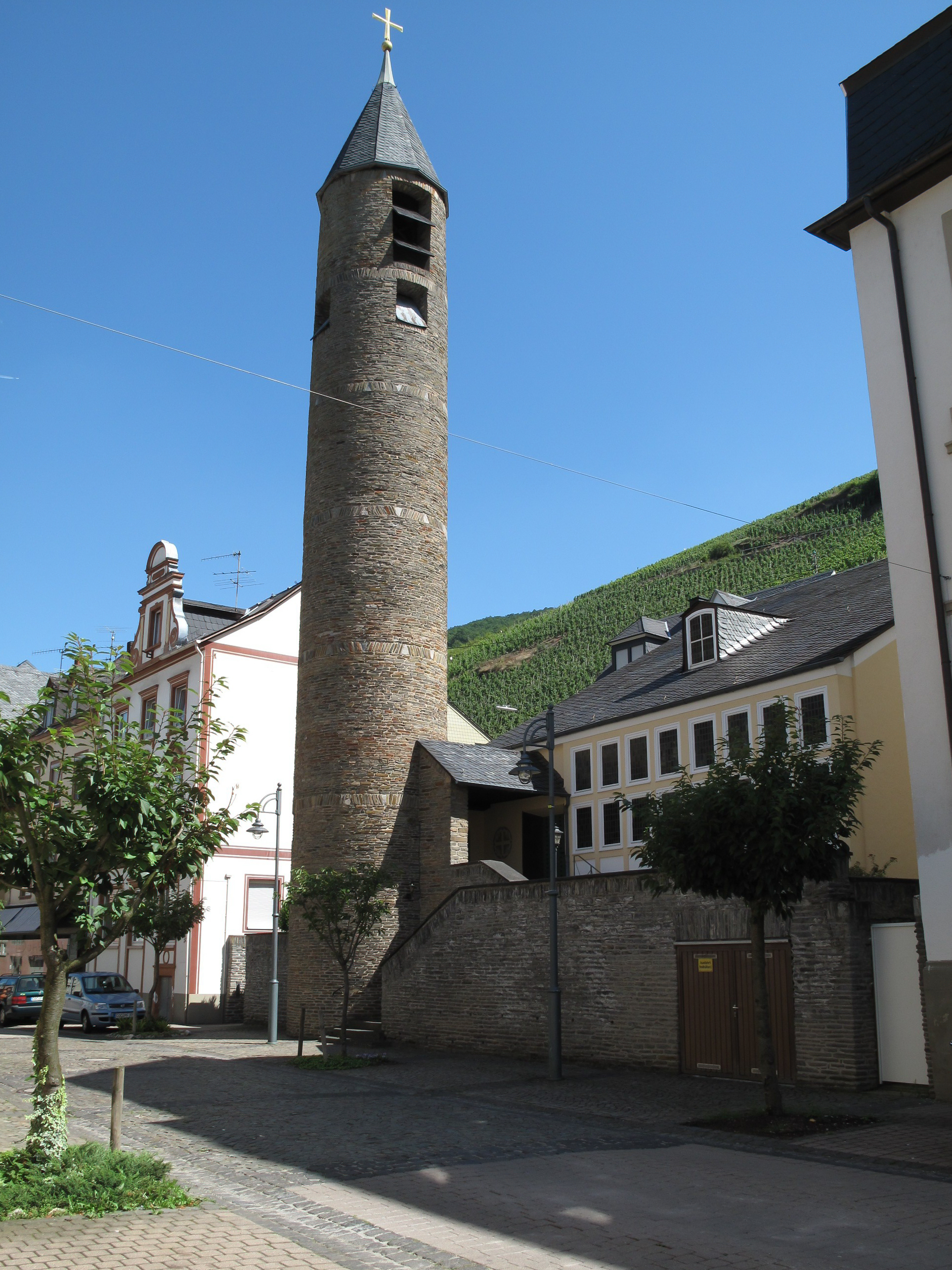
Zell-Mosel, churchtower

=== Religion ===
The greater part of the population is Roman Catholic. In second place is the Evangelical faith.

=== Regular events ===
- Weinfest der Zeller Schwarze Katz (wine festival), always on the last weekend in June, one of the first wine festivals of the year along the Moselle.
- Hahnenkaffee in Zell
- St.-Jakobus-Weinkirmes (wine fair) in Zell-Kaimt, last weekend in July
- Weinfest (wine festival) in Zell-Merl, second weekend in August
- Keltisches Weingelage ("Celtic Wine Binge") in Zell-Kaimt, last weekend in August
- Römerstraßenfest ("Roman Road Festival"), mid August
- Straßenfest der Zeller Turmschützen ("Zell Tower Marksmen's Street Festival"), second weekend in September
- Public wine-tasting at the community hall – Roman wine revelry third weekend in September
- Advent markets every first and second weekend in Advent
- Kappensitzungen (Carnival events) and Rosenmontagsumzug (Shrove Monday parade) from Zell-Kaimt to Zell-Mosel

=== Clubs ===
Zell has the following clubs:

- KKG e. V. Zell-Mosel (carnival and fair club)
- Verkehrs- und Heimatverein (transport and local history)
- Gewerbeverein (industry)
- Aktivkreis Stadtgestaltung ("town design"; subgroup of the Gewerbeverein)
- Ruderverein (rowing)
- Tennisclub
- Stützpunktwehr der VG Zell (firefighting): Town of Zell-Mosel Volunteer Fire Brigade, Zell (Merl) Volunteer Fire Brigade
- Junggesellenverein Merl 1857 e. V. (bachelors' club)
- Merler Weinfreunde ("wine friends")
- Orchester-Vereinigung der Stadt Zell (Mosel) e. V. (orchestra)
- Winzertanzgruppe Zell e. V. ("winemakers' dance group")
- Zeller Turmschützen e. V. ("Tower Marksmen")
- Kolpingsfamilie Zell (Mosel)

=== Sport and leisure ===
Zell has the following sport and leisure facilities:

- Adventure pool
- Sport stadium
- Rowing clubhouse
- Tennis courts
- Miniature golf course
- Bowling alley
- Campground
- Caravan parks
- Collis via ferrata

==== Hiking ====
The lookout tower on the Prinzenkopf offers a panoramic view of all Zell's centres and also of Pünderich, Bullay and the Marienburg.

== Economy and infrastructure ==
=== Winegrowing ===
To a considerable extent, Zell is characterized by winegrowing and with 331 ha of planted vineyards is also, after Piesport (413 ha) the biggest winegrowing centre in the Mosel wine region. Traditionally, it is mostly Riesling that is grown here. Known far beyond the local area is the Zeller Schwarze Katz (a winemaking appellation – Großlage). Winegrowing furthermore also furnishes the groundwork for another industry, tourism, which is also of great economic importance. Zell is, among other things, the seat of the winemaker Zimmermann-Graeff & Müller.

=== Industry ===
Zell is home to Zeller Plastik (ZP), an important employer. ZP's importance lies in injection moulding of plastic closures and packaging components; it is a member of the group Global Closure Systems, a worldwide network of businesses that work in plastics. The daughter company Zeller Engineering makes injection moulding equipment.

=== Trade and crafts ===
In the outlying centre of Barl, many retail businesses with large floor areas have set up shop. Among them, the main one is the Globus Handelshof with an adjoining building centre. Besides this, many midsize wholesale and retail businesses, as well as craft businesses, are located here.

=== Transport ===
The town's link to the Deutsche Bahn railway network with InterCity and Intercity-Express service is through the station in the neighbouring municipality of Bullay on the Koblenz—Trier line, about 7 km away. The station lies on the Koblenz— Trier/Saarbrücken/Luxembourg IC line. There are Bundesstraße connections, too, both north-south (B 421) and east-west (B 53). There are landing stages for international water transport on the Moselle, and Frankfurt-Hahn Airport is roughly a half hour's drive away.

=== Public institutions ===
==== Offices ====
- Verbandsgemeinde of Zell administration
- Simmern-Zell Financial Office

=== Education ===
- Boos-von-Waldeck Grundschule (primary school)
- Hauptschule
- Realschule
- Mosel-Hamm-Schule (special school for those with learning difficulties)
- IGS Zell (comprehensive school with Gymnasium upper level, currently under construction)

== Famous people ==
=== Honorary citizens ===
- Georg Weimer
- Randy Zeller

=== Sons and daughters of the town ===
- Karl Hammes (1896-1939), opera singer and fighter pilot
- Klaus Bremm (1923-2008), winemaker and politician
- Peter-Erwin Jansen (born 1957), publicist
- Bernd Irlenborn (born 1963), German philosopher and professor of philosophy
- Mirko Casper (born 1982), professional footballer
- Mumford Sondheimer (1882-1935), winemaker and socialite

=== Famous people associated with the town ===
- Maria Reese (1889–1958), writer, journalist and Member of the Reichstag; died in Zell
- Moritz Seider (born 6 April 2001 in Zell), NHL Detroit Red Wings
