= List of political scandals in Germany =

This is a list of major political scandals in Germany:

== 1950s ==
- Bavaria casino scandal (1955–1962)

== 1960s ==
- Lockheed bribery scandals (1961–1979)
- Fibag scandal (1961)
- Spiegel affair ("Spiegelaffäre", 1962)
- German rocket experts in Egypt scandal (1962–1965)
- HS.30 scandal (1967–1969)

== 1970s ==
- "Radikalenerlass" or Berufsverbot (1970s)
- Steiner-Wienand scandal (1972)
- Guillaume affair (1974)
- Stammheim wiretapping scandal (1975–1976)
- Frankfurt SPD donation scandal (1975–1977)
- Rudel Scandal (1976)
- Schmücker trial (1976–1991)
- Filbinger scandal (1978)

== 1980s ==
- CDU secret party donations scandal ("Parteispendenaffäre"): "Flick affair" (1982)
- General Günter Kießling's supposed closet homosexuality (1984)
- U-Boat plans scandal, planned submarine sales to Apartheid South Africa (1986–1990)
- Waterkantgate, scandal around Uwe Barschel, carrying on past his mysterious death (1987–early 1990s)

== 1990s ==
- Putnik deal (1990)
- Dream boat scandal (1990–1991)
- Weapons scandal, Israeli inspection and acquisition of East German military hardware scandal, (1991)
- Amigo affair (de:Amigo-Affäre), bribe-scandal forcing the Bavarian prime minister Max Streibl to resign in 1993
- Treuhand (mid-1990s)
- Drawer scandal (1993)
- Work villa scandal (1993)
- Plutonium affair (1995)
- CDU donations scandal (1999) ("Schwarzgeldaffäre")

== 2000s ==
- Berlin banking scandal (2001)
- Mediation scandal (2002)
- Dachau vote fraud (2002)
- Bonus miles scandal (2002)
- Munich CSU scandal (2003–2007)
- QMF scandal (2004)
- RWE payments scandal (2004)
- German Visa Affair (2005)
- BND surveillance of journalists scandal (2005)
- Sachsensumpf (2007)
- Deutsche Telekom surveillance scandal (2008)
- Libya scandal (2008)

== 2010s ==
- Guido Westerwelle's WikiLeaks controversy (2011)
- Guttenberg plagiarism scandal (Causa Guttenberg) (2011)
- Causa Wulff (2011)
- Bavaria nepotism scandal (2013)
- Stendal vote fraud (2014)
- Böhmermann affair (2016)
- Montblanc scandal (2016)
- Regensburg party donation scandal (2017)
- Asylum office scandal (2018)
- Alternative for Germany donation scandal (2018)

== 2020s ==
- Coup d'état plot (2022)
- Wirecard scandal (2022)
