= Hermann Foertsch =

German general (1895–1961)

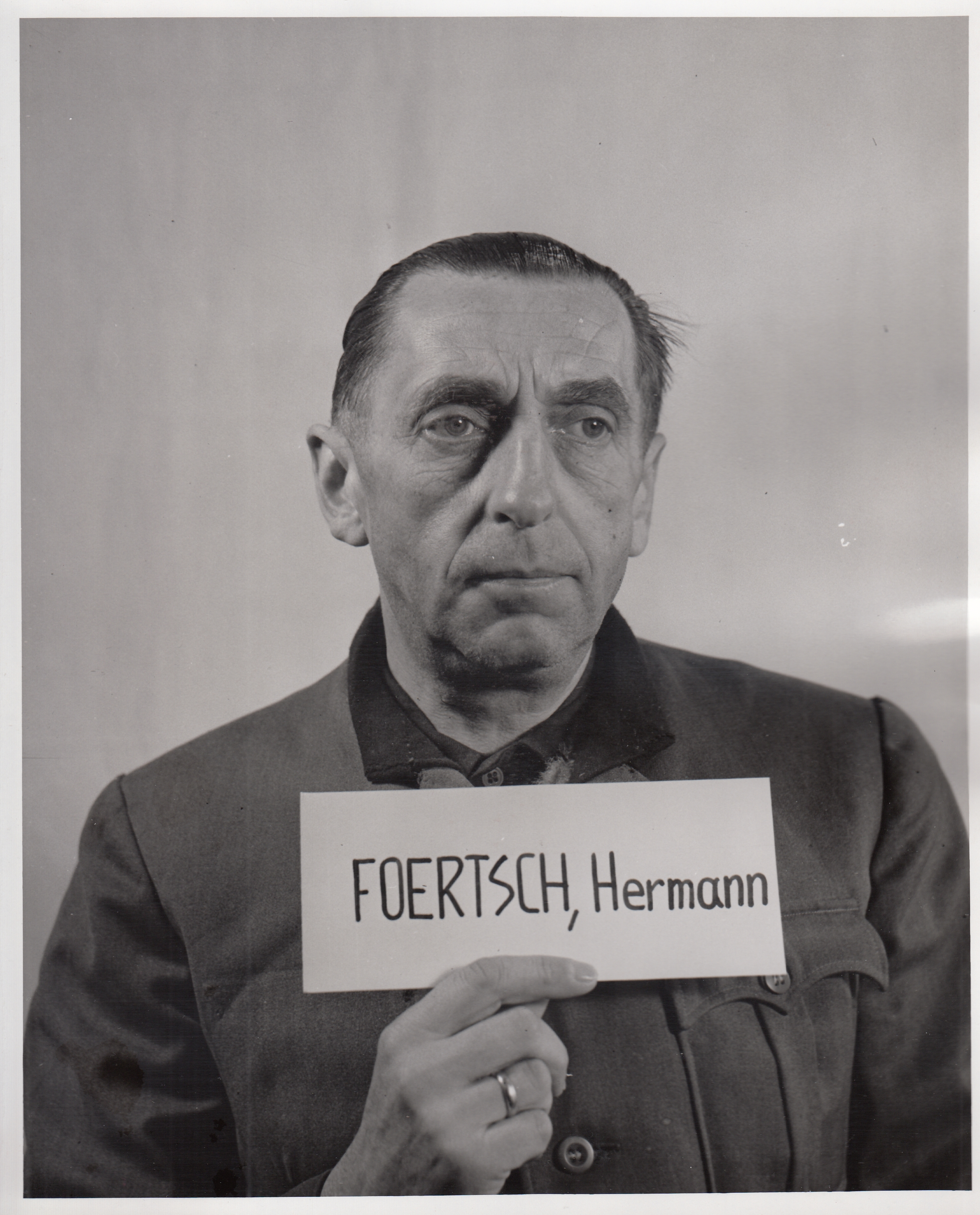
- Foertsch at the Hostages Trial
- Born: 4 April 1895; Drahnow, Deutsch-Krone, German Empire
- Died: 27 December 1961 (aged 66); Munich, West Germany
- Relatives: Friedrich Foertsch (brother)
- Military career
- Allegiance: German Empire; Weimar Republic; Nazi Germany
- Branch: German Army
- Service years: 1913–1945
- Rank: General der Infanterie
- Commands: Chief of General Staff of Army Group F 21st Infantry Division; X Army Corps; 19th Army; 1st Army
- Conflicts: World War I; World War II; Invasion of Poland; Battle of France; Balkan Campaign; Invasion of Yugoslavia; Battle of Narva (1944); Courland Pocket; Operation Undertone
- Awards: Knight's Cross of the Iron Cross

Hermann Foertsch (4 April 1895 – 27 December 1961) was a German general during World War II who held commands at the divisional, corps and army levels. He was a recipient of the Knight's Cross of the Iron Cross of Nazi Germany.

Foertsch was tried at the Hostages Trial in 1947. The trial resulted in Foertsch's acquittal because he was a staff officer at the time that the criminal orders were transmitted.

== Hostages trial ==
As a chief of staff for several generals commanding Wehrmacht forces in occupied Greece and Yugoslavia, Foertsch passed on orders to subordinate units to take hostages or conduct reprisals. These orders were deemed criminal by the Tribunal, but staff officers were not considered culpable unless they drafted such criminal orders or made a special effort to distribute them to the troops that carried them out. Citing a lack of evidence of a commission of an unlawful act, the Tribunal acquitted Foertsch of war crimes.

== Later life ==
After his acquittal, Foertsch collaborated with Hans Speidel in the development of concepts for Germany's rearmament many years before the official foundation of the Bundeswehr, the German army, in 1955. In 1950, Foertsch was the leading member of the select group of former Wehrmacht high-ranking officers invited by Chancellor Konrad Adenauer to take part in the conference to discuss West Germany's rearmament (Wiederbewaffnung). The conference resulted in the Himmerod memorandum that contributed to the myth of the "clean Wehrmacht". Foertsch was involved in the establishment of the European anti-communist organisation Interdoc.

== Awards and decorations ==
- Knight's Cross of the Iron Cross on 27 August 1944 as Generalleutnant and commander of 21. Infanterie-Division

== Works ==
- York. Das Leben eines altpreußischen Generals., Verlag: Coleman, Lübeck, 1932
- Wehrmacht und öffentliche Meinung, Verlag nicht ermittelbar, 1933
- Der deutsche Soldat. - Leipzig: Seemann, 1934
- Im gleichen Schritt und Tritt! Das tönende Buch vom deutschen Heer, Verlag: Knorr & Hirth, München, 1934
- Die Wehrmacht im nationalsozialistischen Staat. Broschek, 1935
- Unsere deutsche Wehrmacht. - Berlin: Zeitgeschichte-Verl., 1935
- Der Offizier der neuen Wehrmacht - Eine Pflichtenlehre. - Berlin: Eisenschmidt, 1936.
- Wehrpflicht-Fibel., Verlag "Offene Worte", 1937
- Schuld und Verhängnis – Die Fritsch-Krise im Frühjahr 1938 als Wendepunkt in der nationalsozialistischen Zeit. DVA, 1951
- Grundzüge der Wehrpolitik., Hanseatische Verlagsanstalt, 1938
- Kriegskunst heute und morgen. - Berlin: Zeitgeschichte-Verl., 1939
- Der Offizier der deutschen Wehrmacht. - Berlin: Eisenschmidt, 1940
- Psychologische Kriegführung: Vortrag, Evang. Akademie, 1953

English:

- The Art of Modern Warfare, Veritas Press, 1940
- My Opinions with Regard to Reports 1, Historical Division, Headquarters United States Army, 1947
- Basic Concepts and Organization for the Conduct of War Prior to World War II, United States, Department of the Army, 1948

Italian:

- L'arte della guerra di oggi e di domani., Nicola Zanichelli Editore, Bologna, 1940

== See also ==
- List of Axis personnel indicted for war crimes

Military offices
| Preceded by None | Chief of General Staff of Heeresgruppe F 12 August 1943 - 15 March 1944 | Succeeded by Generalleutnant August Winter |
| Preceded by Generalmajor Franz Sensfuß | Commander of 21. Infanterie-Division; 28 March 1944 - 22 August 1944 | Succeeded by Generalmajor Heinrich Götz |
| Preceded by General der Infanterie Friedrich Köchling | Commander of X. Armeekorps; 21 September 1944 - 21 December 1944 | Succeeded by Generalleutnant Dr. Ing. Dr. Johannes Mayer |
| Preceded by General der Infanterie Siegfried Rasp | Commander of 19. Armee; 15 February 1945 - 28 February 1945 | Succeeded by General der Infanterie Hans von Obstfelder |
| Preceded by General der Infanterie Hans von Obstfelder | Commander of 1. Armee; 28 February 1945 - 6 May 1945 | Succeeded by General der Kavallerie Rudolf Koch-Erpach |
