= Friedrich Foertsch =

German Wehrmacht and Bundeswehr general

General Friedrich Foertsch
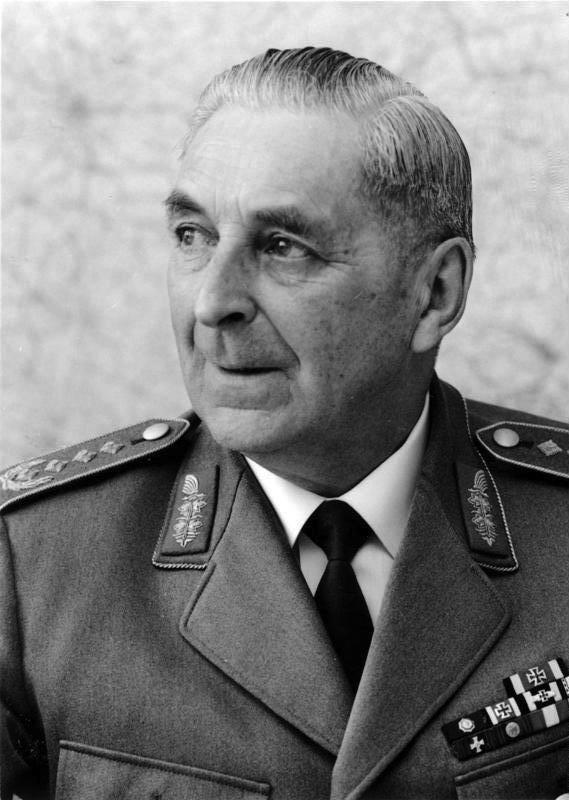
- General Foertsch in an undated photo
- Born: 19 May 1900; Drahnow, Deutsch-Krone
- Died: 14 December 1976 (aged 76); Goslar, Lower Saxony, West Germany
- Relatives: Hermann Foertsch (brother)
- Military career
- Allegiance: German Empire (1918); Kingdom of Prussia; Freikorps (1919–1920); Weimar Republic (1920–1933); Nazi Germany (1933–1945); West Germany
- Branch: Imperial German Army; Wehrmacht; Bundeswehr
- Service years: 1918–1945; 1956–1963
- Rank: Lieutenant General General
- Unit: 18th Army
- Commands: Inspector General of the Bundeswehr (1961–1963); 2nd Panzergrenadier Division (1957–1958); Chief of Staff of Army Group Courland (1945); Chief of Staff of the 18th Army (1943–1945)
- Conflicts: World War I World War II
- Awards: Knight's Cross of the Iron Cross; Great Cross of Merit with Star and shoulder ribbon

Friedrich Albert Foertsch (19 May 1900 – 14 December 1976) was a German general serving during World War II and from 1961 to 1963 the second Inspector General of the Bundeswehr.

Foertsch was born in 1900 and joined the military service in the Prussian Army in 1918. Serving in the infantry in the final battles of World War I, Foertsch earned the Iron Cross second class before the end of hostilities. He joined the Freikorps after the war, and later was accepted into the Reichswehr in 1920.

During World War II, he held several senior staff positions, including chief of the general staff of the 18th Army. Foertsch was awarded the Knight's Cross of the Iron Cross on 5 September 1944 for his leadership in the defensive battles at the Leningrad Front. He was taken prisoner of war in the Courland Pocket by the Soviet Army.

At a postwar trial, he was sentenced to 25 years of hard labor. He was released in 1955 and joined the newly formed Bundeswehr of the West Germany. He again served in many senior positions, including an assignment to the Supreme Headquarters Allied Powers Europe (SHAPE) of NATO in Paris. In 1961 he was appointed Inspector General of the Bundeswehr, a position he held until his retirement in 1963. Friedrich Foertsch died on 14 December 1976 in Goslar.

== Biography ==
Friedrich Foertsch born 19 May 1900 in Drahnow in the district Deutsch-Krone in West Prussia. His father was a government employee for the Prussian Settlement Commission in Posen and West Prussia (Staatliche Verwaltung der Preußischen Ansiedlungskommission für Posen und Westpreußen). Foertsch attended the Gymnasium (secondary school) in Hohensalza and Graudenz and received his Abitur in May 1918. He then volunteered for the military service in the Prussian Army on 21 May 1918. He was assigned to the 8. Westpreußisches Infanterie-Regiment Nr. 175 in Graudenz. Foertsch military career thus took the same path as his older brother's, the later General der Infanterie Hermann Foertsch. Shortly before the end of World War I he participated in the battles of the Schelde at the Wotan- und Hermann positions northeast of Lille and was awarded the Iron Cross 2nd class.

With his brother, Foertsch joined the Freikorps "Feldmarschall Hindenburg" after the war and was accepted by the Reichswehr at the end of 1920, serving as a Fähnrich (ensign) in the 17. Infanterie-Regiment. He was promoted to Leutnant (second lieutenant) on 1 April 1922 and to Oberleutnant (first lieutenant) on 1 February 1927. He became adjutant of the III. (Jäger) Bataillon (3rd light infantry battalion) of the 17. Infanterie Regiment (17th infantry regiment) on 1 October 1927. In 1932 he served with the 12. (MG) Kompanie (12th machine gun company) of the regiment. Transferred to the Kriegsakademie (war academy) in the fall of 1932 he was promoted to Hauptmann on 1 April 1934.

The treaty of Versailles had imposed severe restrictions on Germany's military strength. The Weimar Republic largely obeyed the Versailles restrictions, but with Adolf Hitler's rise to power the remilitarisation began. The Reichswehr, renamed the Wehrmacht, expanded. Foertsch at this time served in the military headquarters in Königsberg. He was appointed company chief in the Infanterie-Regiment 81 on 12 October 1937 and was promoted to Major on 1 August 1938. He was transferred to the Generalstab (General Staff) of the III. Armeekorps (3rd Army Corps) on 10 November 1938, a position he held at the outbreak of World War II. In the fall of 1939 he became the first officer of the general staff (Ia) of the 60. Infanterie-Division (60th infantry division) and participated in the Battle of France.

After the invasion of France he was relieved of his position and was transferred to the chief of staff of the Heeresrüstung and Ersatzheer (Army Equipment and Replacement Army) and attained the rank of Oberstleutnant on 1 November 1940. On 1 June 1942 he was promoted to Oberst im Generalstab and at the same time appointed first officer of the general staff of the 18th Army. Foertsch earned the German Cross in Gold on 10 May 1943 for his support in the heavy fighting in the northern sector of the eastern front. He was appointed chief of the general staff of the 18th Army on 1 December 1943 and promoted to Generalmajor on 1 June 1944. Three months later he received the Knight's Cross of the Iron Cross. He was appointed chief of the general staff of the Heeresgruppe Kurland at the end of January 1945. His promotion to Generalleutnant followed on 1 March 1945.

After the capitulation of all German forces he was taken prisoner of war by the Red Army of the Soviet Union. He was sentenced to 25 years' imprisonment for war crime charges against the destruction of cities and art on 29 June 1950. According to the court, Foertsch permitted the destruction of cities of Pskov, Novgorod and Leningrad by his troops, and the destruction of historical art and memorials in Gatchina, Petergof, Pavlovsk and Pushkin.

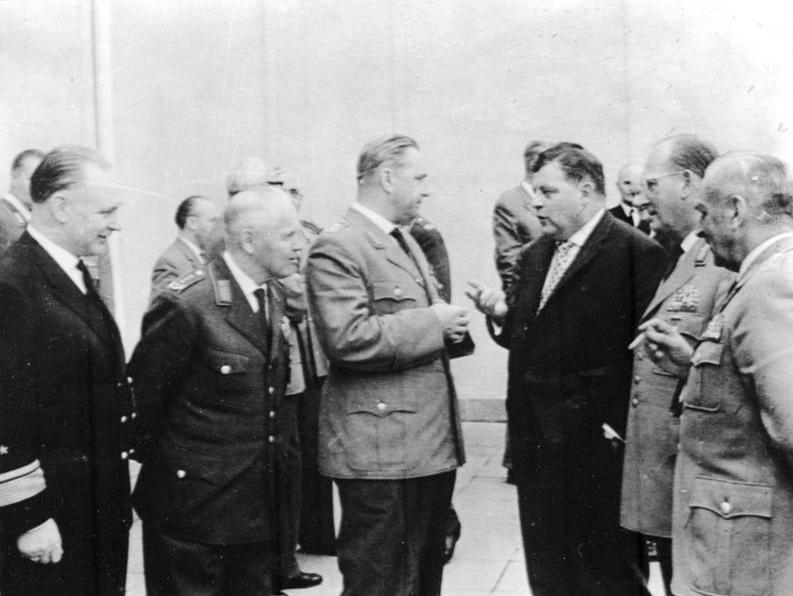
Meeting of the Bundeswehr on 8 June 1961. From left to right Karl-Adolf Zenker, Josef Kammhuber, Albert Schnez, Franz Josef Strauss, Hans Speidel and Friedrich Foertsch

Friedrich Foertsch was released from captivity on 9 October 1955. Bundeskanzler Konrad Adenauer had helped secure the release of the last German prisoners of war in 1955, a decade after the end of the war. He joined the Bundeswehr after the remilitarisation of the Federal Republic of Germany holding the rank of Generalmajor. His initial task was the leadership of the II. Korps and he was appointed commanding officer of the 2. Grenadier-Division in April 1957. He was then posted to the Supreme Headquarters Allied Powers Europe (SHAPE) of NATO in Paris as deputy chief of the fundamental planning office. He succeeded Adolf Heusinger as the second Generalinspekteur der Bundeswehr on 1 April 1961. Under his command the compulsory military service in the Bundeswehr was extended from 12 to 18 months.

He was also in command during the political Spiegel scandal, which led to the resignation of Federal Minister of Defence Franz Josef Strauss. Der Spiegel, a widely read German periodical, had published the article "Bedingt abwehrbereit" ("Conditionally prepared for defense") about a NATO maneuver called Fallex 62, Fall Exercise 1962, in which the NATO forces were to demonstrate their preparedness to resist possible attack by the Soviet Union and/or other Eastern Bloc forces. The maneuvers themselves had demonstrated the Bundeswehr's incapacity to repel attack, and the article exposed the sorry state of Bundeswehr preparedness.

He retired as a four-star general on 31 December 1963. After his retirement he and his wife, together with their four children, lived in Goslar. Friedrich Foertsch died there on 14 December 1976.

== Awards ==
- Iron Cross (1914) 2nd Class
- Honour Cross of the World War 1914/1918
- Clasp to the Iron Cross (1939) 2nd Class
- Iron Cross (1939) 1st Class
- German Cross in Gold (10 May 1943)
- Knight's Cross of the Iron Cross on 5 September 1944 as Generalmajor and chief of the general staff of the 18th Army
- Grand Officer of the Order of Merit of the Italian Republic
- Grand Cross with Star and Sash of the Order of Merit of the Federal Republic of Germany
- Sudetenland Medal
- Wehrmacht Long Service Award, 4th to 1st class
- Commander's Cross of the Order of the Crown of Romania
- Grand Officer of the Legion of Honour (France)
- Legion of Merit (USA)

Military offices
Preceded by General Adolf Heusinger	Inspector General of the Bundeswehr; 1 April 1961 – 31 December 1963	Succeeded by General Heinz Trettner
Preceded by Otto Schaefer	Commander of 2nd Panzergrenadier Division (Bundeswehr); 1957–1958	Succeeded by Alfred Zerbel
