= West German rearmament =

The reconstruction of armed forces in West Germany after World War II

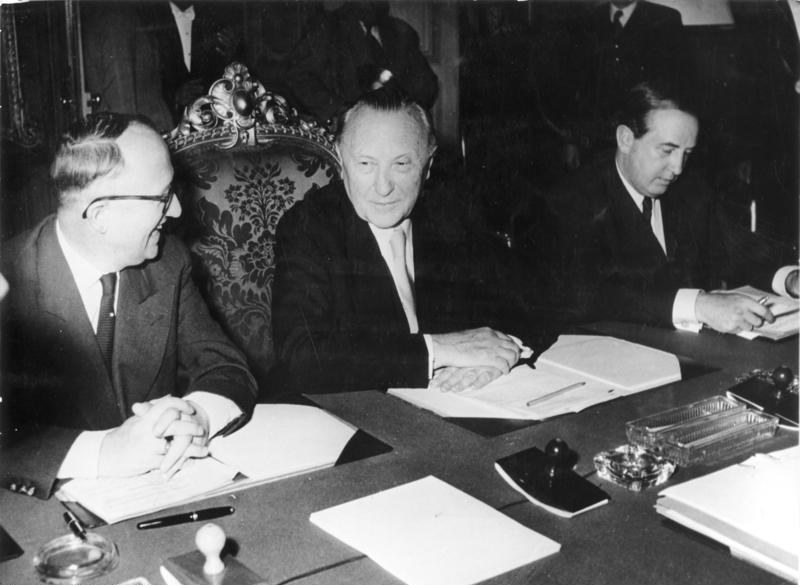
West Germany joins NATO: Walter Hallstein (left) and Konrad Adenauer (centre) at the NATO Conference in Paris in 1954

West German rearmament (German: Wiederbewaffnung) began in the decades after World War II. Fears of another rise of German militarism caused the new military to operate within an alliance framework, under NATO command. The events led to the establishment of the Bundeswehr, the West German military, in 1955. The name Bundeswehr was a compromise choice suggested by former general Hasso von Manteuffel to distinguish the new forces from the Wehrmacht term for the combined German forces of Nazi Germany.

== Background ==
The 1945 Morgenthau Plan had called to reduce Allied-occupied Germany to a pre-industrial state by eliminating its arms industry and other key industries essential to military strength, thus removing its ability to wage war. However, because of the cost of food imports to Germany and the fear that poverty and hunger would drive desperate Germans toward communism, the US government signalled a moderation of this plan in September 1946 with Secretary of State James F. Byrnes's speech "Restatement of Policy on Germany". It gave Germans hope for the future, but it also evidenced the emergence of the Cold War.

People resent the fact that while the United States followed a policy of German disarmament and of friendship with Russia after the war, it now advocates rearmament. They could just as easily argue that it was for cooperation with the Soviet Union and to change its policy.

— Heinz Guderian, Can Europe Be Defended?, 1950

The vigorous disarmament program in Germany continued by the UK and the US for the first three years of occupation. This dismantling of industry became increasingly unpopular and ran contrary to the 1948 Marshall Plan's mission to encourage industrial growth.

On August 29, 1949, the Soviet Union detonated the RDS-1 atomic bomb, which forced a reevaluation of the defense requirements of Western Europe. In June 1950, the Korean War began and raised fears in West Germany, with comparisons drawn between the actions of North Korea and the possible actions of East Germany. Both France and the United Kingdom were wary of the revival of German military potential since they had been severely tested in the world wars. Aneurin Bevan and his left-wing faction of the Labour Party rebelled against the party line in a parliamentary vote supporting West German rearmament, and they seized control of the party's National Executive Committee. American political figures, such as Senator Elmer Thomas, argued that West Germany needed to be included in a defensive system. He stated, "several divisions of German troops should be armed by the United States without Germany herself being permitted to manufacture arms." West German Chancellor Konrad Adenauer was determined to use offers of rearmament to regain sovereignty for West Germany.

During the September 1950 NATO meeting, France decided to become isolated for the rearmament operation because it did not want Germany to join NATO. West Germany wanted to join NATO because of Adenauer's desire to appease the fears of its neighbors and to show a willingness to co-operate. Initial skepticism by the US was set aside after Dwight D Eisenhower endorsed the deal, and West Germany agreed to support the operation.

One of the better-known attempts to win West Germany the right to rearm was the European Defense Community (EDC). A modification of the 1950 Pleven Plan, it proposed the raising of West German forces, integrated into a European Defense Force. When West Germany embraced an edited plan and the push for rearmament seemed to be assured, France vetoed the attempt in August 1954. In 1955, West Germany joined NATO.

== Bundeswehr formation ==
Neither East nor West Germany had any regular armed forces at the time. Instead, they had paramilitary police forces (the western Bundesgrenzschutz and the eastern Kasernierte Volkspolizei). The Bundeswehr (West German military) was armed originally from Military Assistance Program funds from the US. Former Kriegsmarine ships, seized under the Tripartite Naval Commission, were returned by the US. Slowly, West German sailors were stationed on United States Navy ships, and West Germany helped to supply its navy. The operation was intended to ensure that West Germany possessed an effective military force.

The US supplied the potential sailors with intensive training to help build up the German Navy for the future. The German generals wanted a small air force, the Luftwaffe, which would focus on supporting ground operations. Chancellor Konrad Adenauer's budget called for limited air power. However, the United States Air Force leaders, co-ordinating with the small Luftwaffe staff, successfully promoted a much larger Luftwaffe along American lines.

West Germany set a goal to have up to 500,000 men in military service, partly because Theodor Blank desired for West Germany to have a more significant military than Italy to project power and increase its contributions. To get his point across, he used this chart:

Country	Peacetime military strength	Percentage of population
United States	2,865,000	1.8
United Kingdom	772,000	1.5
France	850,000	2.0
Belgium	145,000	1.6
Netherlands	125,000	1.2
West Germany	500,000	1.0

To reach that goal, the West German border security force (Bundesgrenzschutz) was transformed into military personnel by using both conscripts and volunteers. West Germany instituted a policy of conscription, despite apprehension that the new fighting force would be compared to the Nazi-era Wehrmacht. Erik Reger, the editor of the Berlin daily Tagesspiegel, was noted as saying, "As soon as Germany has soldiers, there will be war". He argued that military support could lead to a rightward shift in national politics. The Social Democrats argued that even though the military was expanded to a positive reception, it would not be enough to revive German militarism.

Among many former German officers, however, there was the conviction that no future German army could be possible without a rehabilitation of the Wehrmacht. To that end, a group of former senior officers gathered on 9 October 1950 at Himmerod Abbey to produce a memorandum for Adenauer, which included these key demands:

- All German soldiers convicted as war criminals (Kriegsverurteilte) would be released.
- The defamation of the German soldiers, including those from the Waffen-SS, would have to cease.
- Measures to assure the welfare of former soldiers and their widows would have to be taken.

Adenauer accepted those propositions and in turn advised the representatives of the three Western powers that a German military would not be possible as long as German soldiers remained in custody or were brought before courts. The willingness of the former Allies to commute a number of sentences for incarcerated officers undoubtedly tied back to that condition. In the early months of 1951, public declarations from Dwight D. Eisenhower and other United States Armed Forces officers followed that outlined "a real difference between the German soldier and Hitler and his criminal group".

== Bundesmarine formation ==
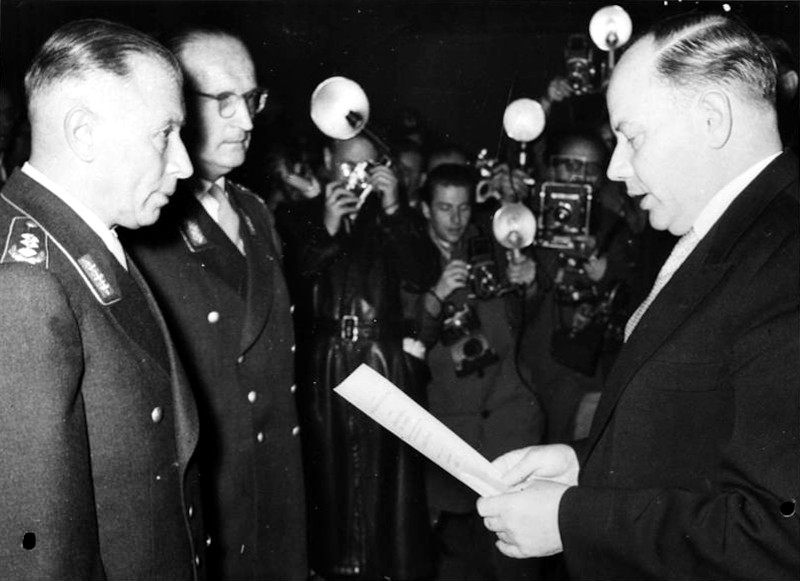
Generals Adolf Heusinger and Hans Speidel sworn into the newly founded Bundeswehr by Theodor Blank on 12 November 1955

The US established the Naval Historical Team (NHT) to help with the Anglo-American World War II naval historical project. Both countries recruited German naval veterans and naval activists to help expand the future West German navy by gaining a better perspective of the previous naval war. However, the NHT soon shifted focus to pursue information about Soviet naval forces. Its initial goal was to study the landings and targets of the Soviet Navy. The agency became the coordinating staff of the Bundesmarine, the West German Navy. Another group of veterans of the former Kriegsmarine, called "labour service units", was assigned to similar tasks of deciphering surveillance. Adenauer created the Blank Office (Amt Blank) to use West German defense contributions as leverage for increased sovereignty. With the different organizations working together, a naval proposal referred to as the Wagner Paper was adopted to use as a negotiation tool at the February 1951 conference of the EDC, held in Paris. However, France forced a deadlock by opposing the threat of naval rearmament. especially as it had perceived links to the Nazi regime.

To resolve the issue, the Wagner Paper was sent to the Supreme Headquarters Allied Powers Europe (SHAPE), which was in favor of naval rearmament. France compromised by offering some escort ships and accepting the naval buildup. However, the West German military remained under the supreme allied NATO control, which diminished its command positions.

== Effects ==
The growth of the German Bundeswehr proved a key element in the growth of West German influence in central Europe. This, along with the 1951 Treaty of Paris, cemented the elements of Western European economic cooperation, and helped to integrate post-war West Germany into the European community. At the same time, the Soviet Union used this as a foundational justification to implement the Warsaw Pact, which formalized substantial military and political control over key Eastern European states.

== Sources ==
- Beisner, Robert L. Dean Acheson: a life in the Cold War (Oxford University Press, 2009) pp. 356–374.
- Corum, James S. "Building a New Luftwaffe: The United States Air Force and Bundeswehr Planning for Rearmament, 1950–60." Journal of Strategic Studies 27#1 (2004): 89-113.</
- Curtis, Glenn. "The Warsaw Pact" in Czechoslovakia: A Country Study (2008)
- Granieri, Ronald J. The Ambivalent Alliance: Konrad Adenauer, the CDU/CSU, and the West, 1949-1966 (Berghahn Books, 2003).
- Guderian, Heinz, Kann Westeuropa verteidigt werden?, Göttingen, 1950; and idem, So geht es nicht, Heidelberg, 1951.
- Halsall, Paul. "Treaty Of Friendship, Co-Operation And Mutual Assistance." Modern History Sourcebook. November 1998 . Internet Modern History Sourcebook. 18 Feb 2008
- Hershberg, James G. "'Explosion in the Offing: German Rearmament and American Diplomacy, 1953–1955." Diplomatic History 16.4 (1992): 511-550.
- Large, David K. Germans to the Front: West German Rearmament in the Adenauer Era. Chapel Hill, University of North Carolina Press, 1996.
- Snyder, David R., "Arming the "Bundesmarine": The United States and the Build-Up of the German Federal Navy, 1950–1960." Journal of Military History, Vol. 66, No. 2. (Apr., 2002), pp. 477–500.
- Speier, Hans. German Rearmament and Atomic War. Evanston, Illinois: Row, Peterson and Company, 1957.
- Smelser, Ronald; Davies, Edward J. (2008). The Myth of the Eastern Front: the Nazi-Soviet war in American popular culture. New York: Cambridge University Press. ISBN 9780521833653.
- Zimmermann, Hubert. Money and Security: Troops, Monetary Policy, and West Germany's Relations with the United States and Britain, 1950-1971 (2002)
