= Himmerod memorandum =

1950 document on West German rearmament

The Himmerod memorandum (German: Himmeroder Denkschrift) was a 40-page document produced in 1950 after a secret meeting of former Wehrmacht high-ranking officers invited by Chancellor Konrad Adenauer to the Himmerod Abbey to discuss West Germany's Wiederbewaffnung (rearmament). The resulting document laid the foundation for the establishment of the new military force (Bundeswehr) of the Federal Republic.

The memorandum, along with the public declaration of Wehrmacht's "honour" by the Allied military commanders and West Germany's politicians, contributed to the creation of the myth of the clean Wehrmacht.

== Background ==
The Potsdam Conference held by the Soviet Union, the United Kingdom, and the United States from 17 July to 2 August 1945, largely determined the occupation policies that the occupied country was to face after its defeat, including demilitarization, denazification, democratization, and decentralization. The Allies' often crude and ineffective implementation caused the local population to dismiss the process as "noxious mixture of moralism and 'victors' justice'".

For those in the Western zones of occupation, the advent of the Cold War undermined the demilitarization process by seemingly justifying the key part of Hitler's foreign policies, the "fight against Soviet bolshevism". In 1950, after the outbreak of the Korean War, the Americans felt that a West German army clearly had to be revived to help face off the Soviet Union, and American and West German politicians confronted the prospect of rebuilding the West German armed forces.

== Himmerod Abbey conference ==
From 5 to 9 October 1950, a group of former senior officers, at the behest of Adenauer, met in secret at the Himmerod Abbey (hence the memorandum's name) to discuss West Germany's rearmament. The participants were divided in several subcommittees, which focused on the political, ethical, operational and logistical aspects of the future armed forces.

The resulting memorandum included a summary of the discussions at the conference and bore the name "Memorandum on the Formation of a German Contingent for the Defense of Western Europe within the framework of an International Fighting Force". It was intended as both a planning document and a basis of negotiations with the Western Allies.

The participants of the conference were convinced that no future German army would be possible without the historical rehabilitation of the Wehrmacht and so the memorandum included these key demands:

- All German soldiers convicted as war criminals would be released.
- The "defamation" of the German soldier, including those of the Waffen-SS, would have to cease.
- "Measures to transform both domestic and foreign public opinion" with regards to the German military would need to be taken.

The chairman of the conference summarised the foreign policy changes demanded in the memorandum with this comment: "Western nations must take public measures against the 'prejudicial characterization' of the former German soldiers and must distance the former regular armed forces from the 'war crimes issue'". Adenauer accepted the memorandum and began a series of negotiations with the three Western powers to satisfy those demands.

== Aftermath ==
Adenauer accepted the propositions and, in turn, advised the representatives of the three Western powers that German armed forces would not be possible as long as German soldiers remained in custody. To accommodate the West German government, the Allies commuted a number of war crimes sentences.

A public declaration from Supreme Allied Commander Dwight Eisenhower followed in January 1951 that attested to the Wehrmacht's "honour". Prior to signing the declaration and discussing it with the press, Eisenhower met with former Wehrmacht Generals Adolf Heusinger and Hans Speidel, both of whom participated in the Himmerod conference, and was impressed by them. The declaration read in part:

I have come to know that there was a real difference between the German soldier and Hitler and his criminal group. ... For my part, I do not believe that the German soldier as such has lost his honor.

In the same year (1951), some former career officers of the Wehrmacht were granted war pensions under Article 131 of the Common Law. Eisenhower's public statement gave the former Wehrmacht generals the ability to expand on the revisionist work that they had already done for the United States Army Historical Division, thus getting their message beyond the small circle of Allied intelligence officers.

Adenauer made a similar statement in a Bundestag debate on Article 131 of the Basic Law, West Germany's provisional constitution. He stated that the German soldier fought honourably as long as he "had not been guilty of any offense". The declarations laid the foundation of the myth of the clean Wehrmacht, which reshaped the West's perception of the Nazi war effort and led to the Wehrmacht's eventual rehabilitation in the eyes of the public and the Allied authorities.

== Participants ==
- Wolf Graf von Baudissin (Army)
- Hermann Foertsch (Army)
- Walter Gladisch (Navy)
- Adolf Heusinger (Army)
- Johann Adolf Graf von Kielmansegg (Army)
- Robert Knauss (Air Force)
- Horst Krüger (Air Force)
- Rudolf Meister (Air Force)
- Eberhard Graf von Nostitz (Army)
- Hans Röttiger (Army)
- Friedrich Ruge (Navy)
- Alfred Schulze-Hinrichs (Navy)
- Fridolin von Senger und Etterlin (Army)
- Hans Speidel (Army)
- Heinrich von Vietinghoff (Army)
