= 2nd Panzer Division =

2nd Panzer Division may refer to:

- 2nd SS Panzer Division Das Reich
- 2nd Panzergrenadier Division (Bundeswehr)
- 2nd Panzer Division (Wehrmacht)

== See also ==
- 2nd Division (disambiguation)
