= Alfred Zerbel =

German general (1904–1987)

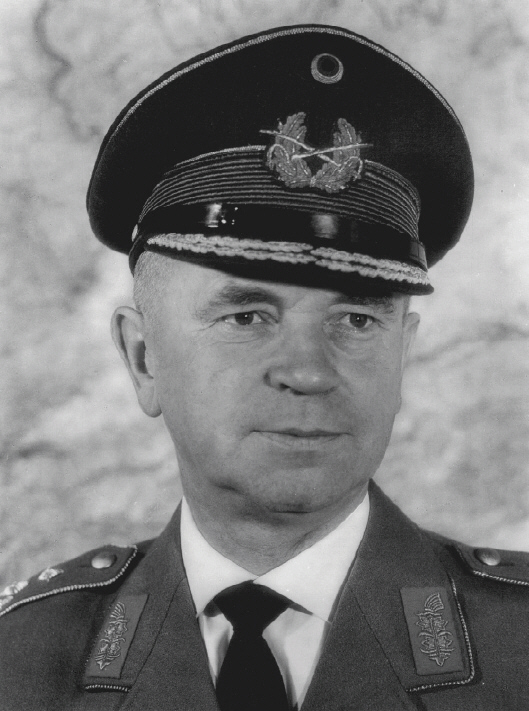
- Zerbel in 1960
- Born: 8 September 1904; Ostritz, Saxony, German Empire
- Died: 15 December 1987 (aged 83)
- Allegiance: Weimar Republic (to 1933); Nazi Germany (to 1945); West Germany
- Branch: Reichsheer; Army; Bundeswehr
- Service years: 1924–1945; 1956–1964
- Rank: Oberst im Generalstab (Wehrmacht); Generalleutnant (Bundeswehr)
- Commands: 2nd Panzergrenadier Division; Inspector of the Army
- Conflicts: World War II
- Awards: German Cross in Silver

Alfred Zerbel (8 September 1904 – 15 December 1987) was a German general who served as a staff officer in the Wehrmacht during World War II, and as the second Inspector of the Army in the German Army of the Bundeswehr.

== Biography ==
Zerbel first entered the military as an infantry officer candidate in the Reichswehr in 1924, and received his commission in 1927. In the Wehrmacht, he served in the army's general staff, the Oberkommando des Heeres, and as first staff officer (chief of staff) of the 299th Infantry Division and Army Group Centre on the Eastern Front. He received the Silver German Cross in February 1945. At the end of the war, he led a Kampfgruppe of the 11th Panzer Division.

After being captured by the Americans, he was a prisoner of war until 1948. During the denazification period, he served on the U.S. Army's Operational History (German) Section. In 1956, he joined the Bundeswehr as a colonel. He was promoted to brigadier general, and then Major General, serving as a staff officer and deputy corps commander. In 1958, he was made commander of the 2nd Panzergrenadier Division, and in April 1960 he became Inspector of the Army, the commander of the German Army, on the death of Hans Röttiger. He served until his retirement in September 1964.

Military offices
Preceded by Generalleutnant Hans Röttiger	Inspector of the Army; 16 April 1960 – 30 September 1964	Succeeded by Generalleutnant Ulrich de Maizière
Preceded by Friedrich Foertsch	Commander of 2nd Panzergrenadier Division (Bundeswehr); 1 June 1958 – 10 February 1960	Succeeded by Ottomar Hansen
