= Charles Cumont =

Belgian military officer and modern pentathlete (1902–1990)

Baron Charles Cumont
- Born: Charles Paul de Cumont; 31 May 1902; Brussels, Belgium
- Died: 9 June 1990 (aged 88); Brussels, Belgium
- Military career
- Allegiance: Belgium
- Commands: Joint Chiefs of Staff; Chairman of the NATO Military Committee

Charles Paul de Cumont
Personal information
- Full name: Charles P. Cumont
- Born: 31 May 1902 Ixelles, Belgium
- Died: 9 June 1990 (aged 88) Uccle, Belgium

Sport
- Country: Belgium
- Sport: Modern pentathlon

Baron Charles Paul de Cumont (31 May 1902 – 9 June 1990) was a Belgian general, and served as chairman of the Belgian joint chiefs of staff between 1959 and 1963, and chairman of the NATO Military Committee from 1962 to 1963 and again in 1964 to 1968. He was also a modern pentathlete who competed at the 1928 Summer Olympics. He finished in 35th equal place with Josef Schejbal.

== Military awards ==
Awards de Cumont has received during his life.

Commander, Order of Leopold (Belgium)
Knight, Order of the Oak Crown (Luxembourg)
Grand Cross, Order of Merit (Germany)
Knight Grand Cross, Order of Orange-Nassau (Netherlands)
Commander, Legion of Merit (USA)
Knight, Order of the British Empire (UK)
Military Merit Cross (Czechoslovakia)
Order of the Crown (Iran)
