= Hans Röttiger =

German general

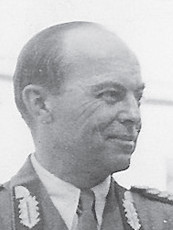
- Röttiger in 1945

Inspector of the Army
- In office 21 September 1957 – 15 April 1960
- Preceded by: Office established
- Succeeded by: Alfred Zerbel

Personal details
- Born: 16 April 1896 Hamburg, German Empire
- Died: 15 April 1960 (aged 63) Bonn, North Rhine-Westphalia, West Germany
- Resting place: Friedhof Ohlsdorf
- Relations: Major of the Reserves Professor Dr. phil. Carl Wilhelm Heinrich Gustav Röttiger (father); Anna Boyer (mother); Ilse Boldt (wife)

Military service
- Allegiance: German Empire; Weimar Republic; Nazi Germany; West Germany
- Branch/service: Prussian Army; Reichswehr; German Army; Bundeswehr
- Years of service: 1914–1945; 1956–1960
- Rank: General der Panzertruppe; Generalleutnant
- Commands: Army Group A Army Group C
- Battles/wars: World War I World War II
- Awards: Iron Cross; Hanseatic Cross (Hamburg); Wehrmacht Long Service Award; German Cross in Gold

Hans Röttiger (16 April 1896 – 15 April 1960) was a German career military officer who served in the militaries of four German states: the Imperial Army of the German Empire, the Reichswehr of the Weimar Republic, the Wehrmacht of Nazi Germany where he served as a Panzer General during the Second World War, and Bundeswehr of West Germany where he served as the first Inspector of the Army.

== Life ==
Röttiger joined the Prussian Army in 1914 and served from 1915 as a Leutnant in the 20th Artillery Regiment. After the First World War he served in the Reichswehr as a battery officer, adjutant, and battery chief. He then served as an officer on the General Staff of the Wehrmacht.

At the beginning of the Second World War Röttiger was an Oberstleutnant and he served from 1939 to 1940 as the Chief of Operations for VI Corps. From 1940 to 1942 he was Chief of Staff of XXXXI Corps and was then appointed the Chief of Staff of the 4th Panzer Army on the Eastern Front, serving at Stalingrad. From 1943 to 1944 he was Chief of Staff of the 4th Army and then of Army Group A from 1944 to 1945 under Generaloberst Josef Harpe. He then became the Chief of Staff of Army Group C in Italy under Generalfeldmarschall Albert Kesselring. On 30 January 1945 he was promoted to General der Panzertruppe.

Röttiger was a prisoner of war of the British and Americans from the end of the war until 1948. In 1950 he was a participant at the meeting to discuss the establishment of a new German defence force; the result of the meeting was the Himmerod memorandum.

Röttiger was accepted into the Bundeswehr in 1956 at the rank of Generalleutnant. On 21 September 1957 he became the first Inspector of the Army and was instrumental in its early development.

== Death ==
Röttiger was diagnosed with cancer in the late 1950s and spent his last years undergoing treatment. In the morning of 15 April 1960 he died in office, one day before his 64th birthday.

== Awards and decorations ==
- Iron Cross (1914), 2nd and 1st Class
- Hanseatic Cross of Hamburg
- Honour Cross of the World War 1914/1918 with Swords
- Wehrmacht Long Service Award, 4th to 1st Class
- Anschluss Medal
- Sudetenland Medal
- Repetition Clasp 1939 to the Iron Cross 1914, 2nd and 1st Class
- Winter Battle in the East 1941–42 Medal
- German Cross in Gold on 26 January 1942 as Oberst im Generalstab and Chief of the General Staff of the XXXXI Corps

== Notes ==
Military offices
New title	Inspector of the Army; 21 September 1957 – 15 April 1960	Succeeded by Generalleutnant Alfred Zerbel
