= Drzonowo Wałeckie =

- Village
- Location within Poland
- Coordinates: 53°3′44″N 16°11′6″E
- Country: Poland
- Voivodeship: West Pomeranian
- County: Wałcz
- Gmina: Człopa
- Time zone: UTC+1 (CET)
  - Summer (DST): UTC+2 (CEST)
- Vehicle registration: ZWA

Drzonowo Wałeckie (Polish: [dʐɔˈnɔvɔ vaˈwɛt͡skʲɛ]; German: Drahnow) is a village in the administrative district of Gmina Człopa, within Wałcz County, West Pomeranian Voivodeship, in north-western Poland. It lies approximately 5 km (3 mi) south-east of Człopa, 30 km (19 mi) south-west of Wałcz, and 114 km (71 mi) east of the regional capital Szczecin.

== History ==
The area was part of the Kingdom of Poland until the First Partition of Poland in 1772, then part of Prussia and Germany in 1772–1945. It became again part of Poland following the defeat of Germany in World War II in 1945.

== Notable residents ==
- Friedrich Foertsch (1900–1976), Inspector General of the Bundeswehr
- Hermann Foertsch (1895–1961), general
