= Himmerod Abbey =

German Cistercian monastery

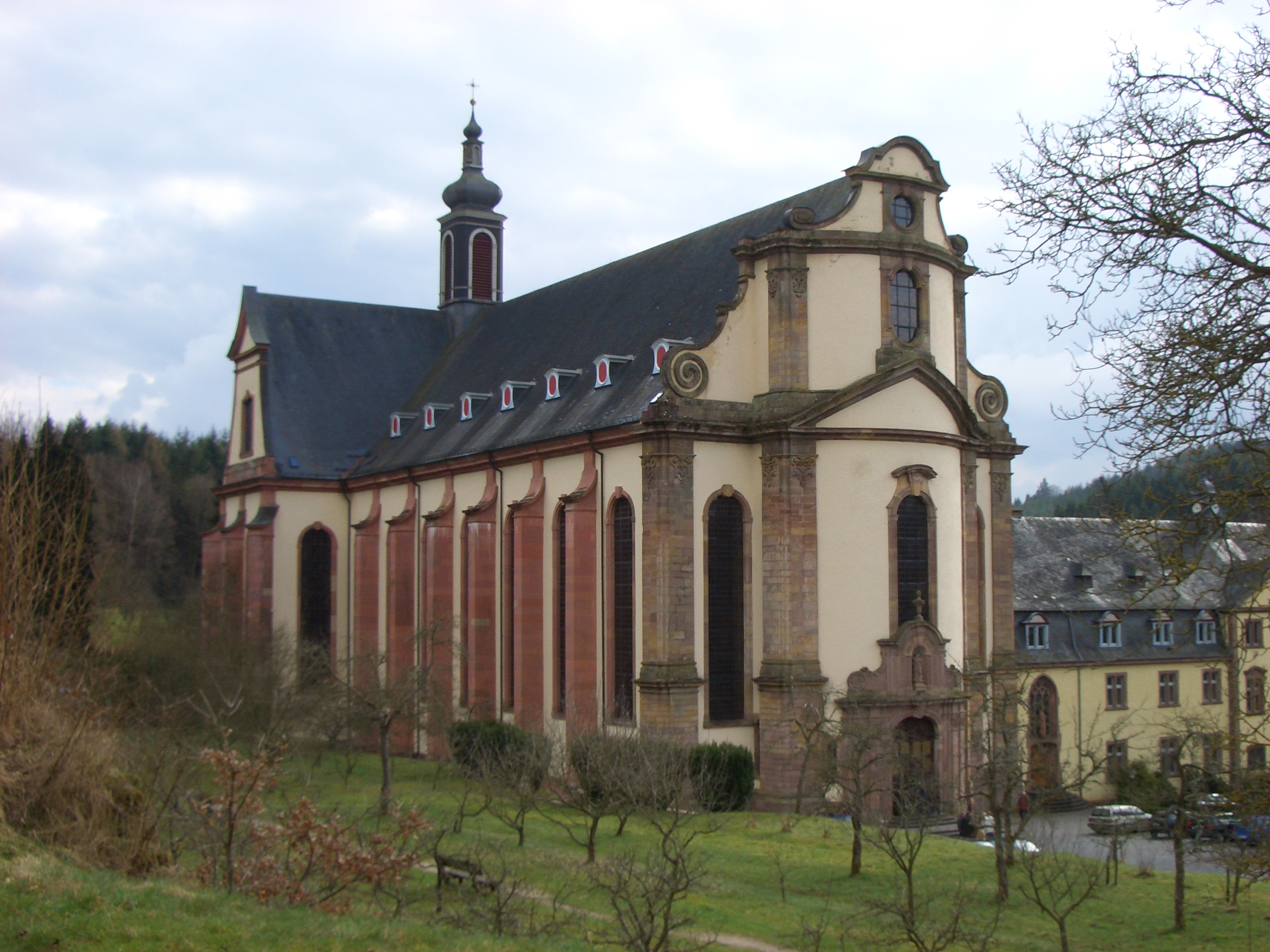
- Himmerod Abbey church, 2005
- Interactive map of Himmerod Abbey

Monastery information
- Order: Cistercian
- Established: 1134, 1922
- Disestablished: 1802, 2017
- Mother house: Clairvaux Abbey

People
- Founder: St. Bernard of Clairvaux

Site
- Location: Rhineland-Palatinate, Germany
- Coordinates: 50°01′40″N 6°45′24″E

Himmerod Abbey (Kloster Himmerod) was a Cistercian monastery in the community of Großlittgen in the Verbandsgemeinde of Manderscheid in the district of Bernkastel-Wittlich, Rhineland-Palatinate, Germany, located in the Eifel, in the valley of the Salm.

The Cistercian convent of Himmerod was dissolved in October 2017 due to financial constraints and the small number of monks. The remaining monks relocated to other abbeys. The property was conveyed to the Roman Catholic Diocese of Trier, which continues to manage it as a spiritual center.

== History ==
=== First foundation ===
Himmerod Abbey was founded in 1135 by Saint Bernard and is a direct foundation of Clairvaux. David of Himmerod, a Cistercian mystic known for his holiness rather than miracles, was sent to the abbey by Bernard.

The first church, built in the Romanesque style, was completed in 1178. In its turn it founded a daughter house, Heisterbach Abbey, in 1189. The abbey owned extensive land and vineyards. The Baroque church was completed in 1751, but after secularisation in 1802 under French occupation fell into ruin.

=== Second foundation ===
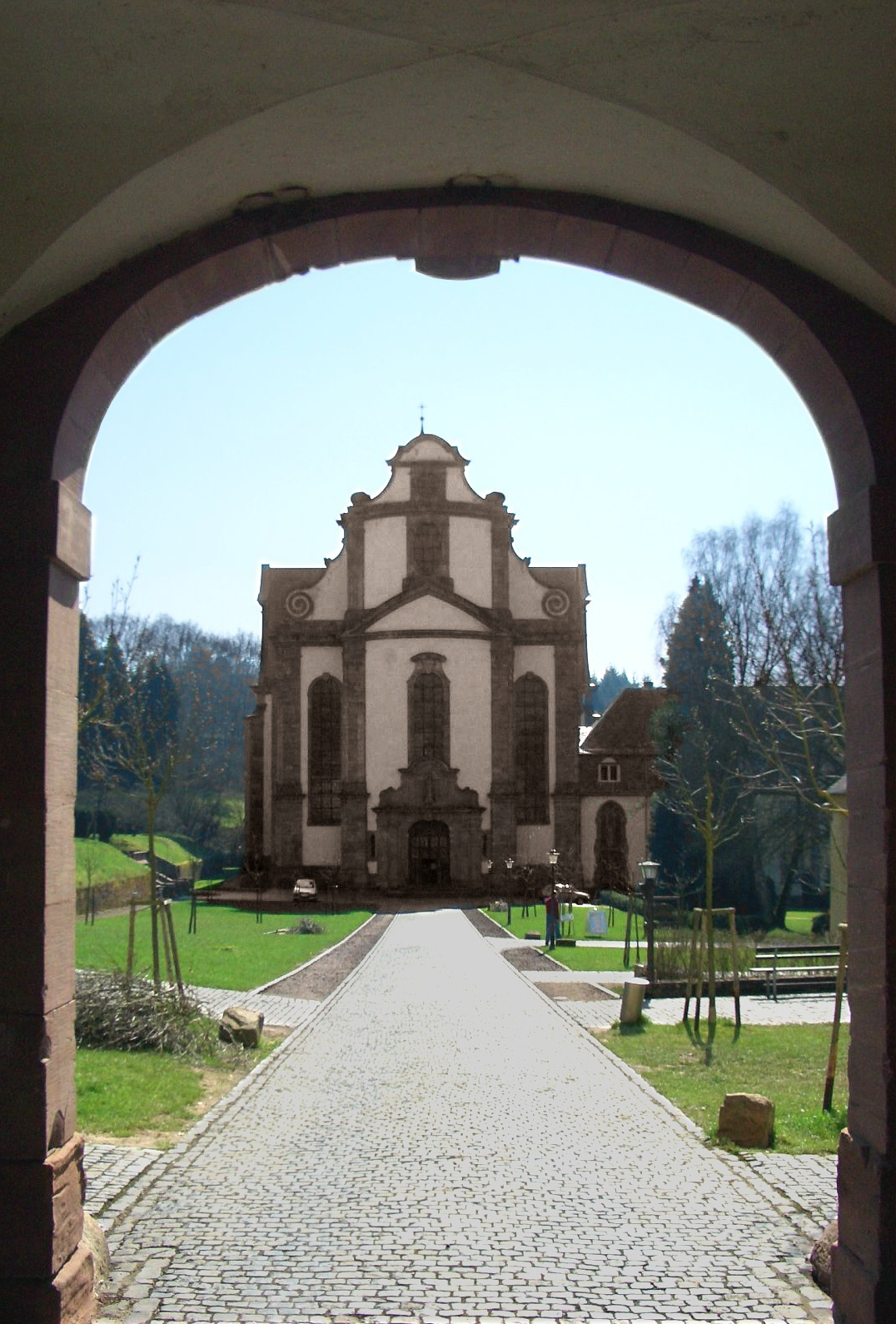
Himmerod Abbey, main entrance

In 1922 the monastery was re-founded by the settlement here of German Cistercian monks from the former Trappist monastery of Mariastern in the present Bosnia. The church was re-built under Abbot Vitus Recke (abbot from 1937 to 1959), and completed in 1962, and contains a famous organ by Johannes Klais. In the 1950s the abbey had a mutual aid firefighting agreement with nearby Spangdahlem Air Base. The USAF had similar agreements with dozens of villages surrounding the base as a public relations initiative.

The new abbey founded the Abbey of the Holy Cross, Itaporanga near São Paulo in Brazil, in 1936.

The oldest maintained convent building, the "Old Mill", was changed after sweeping renovation in 1998 into a museum. It contains information on the history of the Cistercians, the museum of enamel art, the mill's equipment, and also a number of cultural events. Himmerod was a member of the Mehrerau Cistercian Congregation. The last abbot (as of 2017) was Abbot Johannes.

=== Himmerod memorandum ===
From 5 October to 9 October 1950, officers of the former Wehrmacht, on the authority of the West German government, met in conference at Himmerod Abbey to prepare for Chancellor Konrad Adenauer to launch the re-armament of Germany. The conference produced the Himmerod memorandum (German: Himmeroder Denkschrift), which laid out the prerequisites for re-armament and suggested what Germany could contribute to the defense of western Europe. This was an important step toward the official founding of the Bundeswehr in 1955.

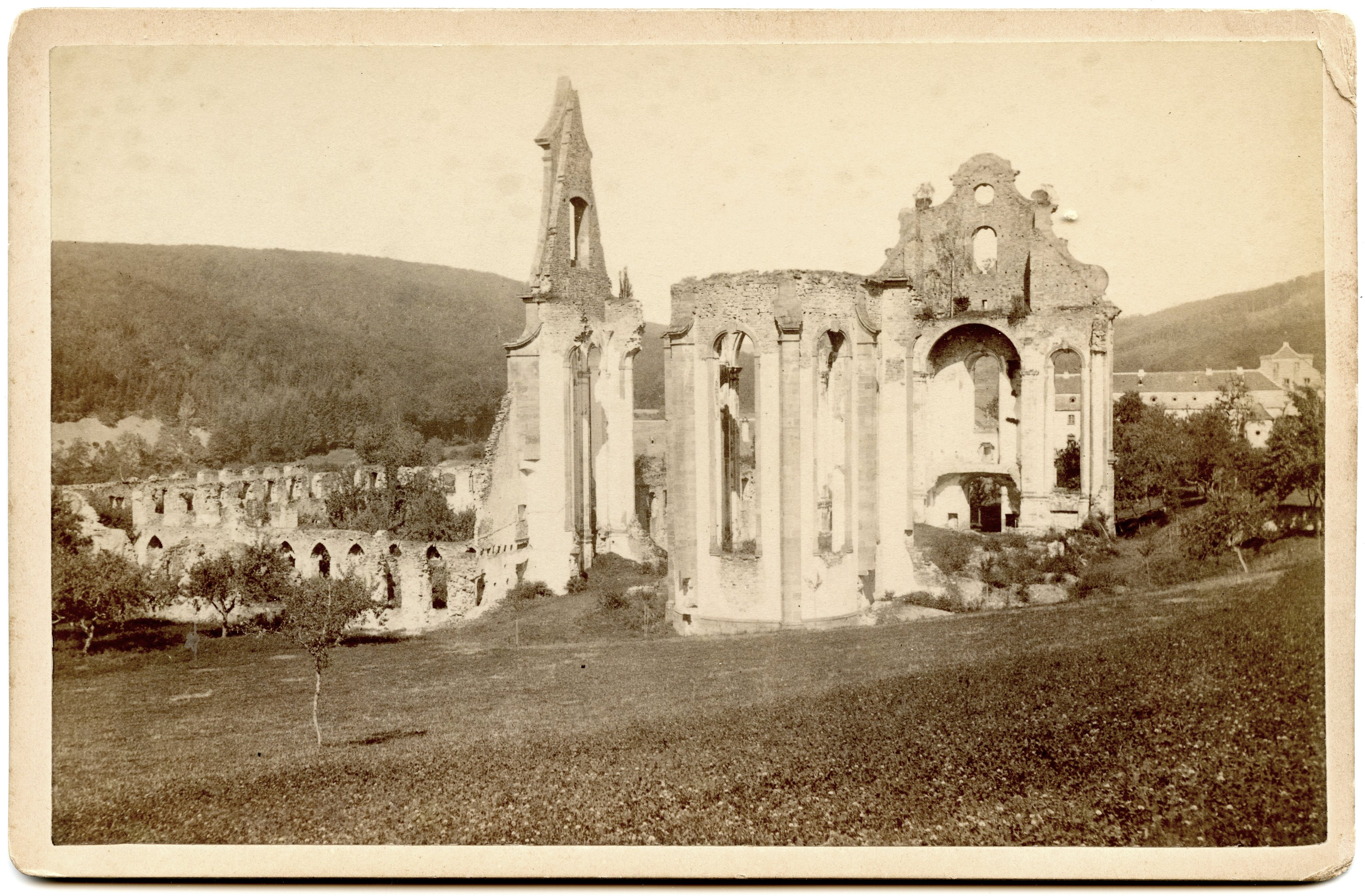
The abbey in the 1880s before it was rebuilt

=== Closure ===
The Cistercian convent of Himmerod was dissolved in October 2017, after less than a hundred years of operation. The monastery’s abbot referred to the financial situation of the abbey as having led to the decision. The monastery’s property near the village of Großlittgen was transferred to the Diocese of Trier. Five of the six monks had left Himmerod by March 2018. Stephan Reimund Senge remained, the last formal member of the abbey.

== Present day ==
The abbey has a café, a book and art shop, plant nursery, and museum which as of 2023 remain open. The fishery is leased out, and it too, remains in operation. The monastery hostel is run by the abbey's support association. Besides gift articles, books and recordings, the monastery shop sells juices, mustard and honey, and also the strong Abbey beer, liqueurs, brandies or Viez to support the preservation of Himmerod.

=== Publications ===
The abbey ran a publishing house, the Himmerod Drucke, which published over fifty works, most by Stephan Reimund Senge, a monk at Himmerod. The journal Unsere Liebe Frau von Himmerod ("Our Lady of Himmerod") appeared three times a year. The newsletter Himmeroder Rundbrief, now in its forty-ninth year, continues to provide information on life at Himmerod.
