= Theodor Blank =

German politician (1905–1972)

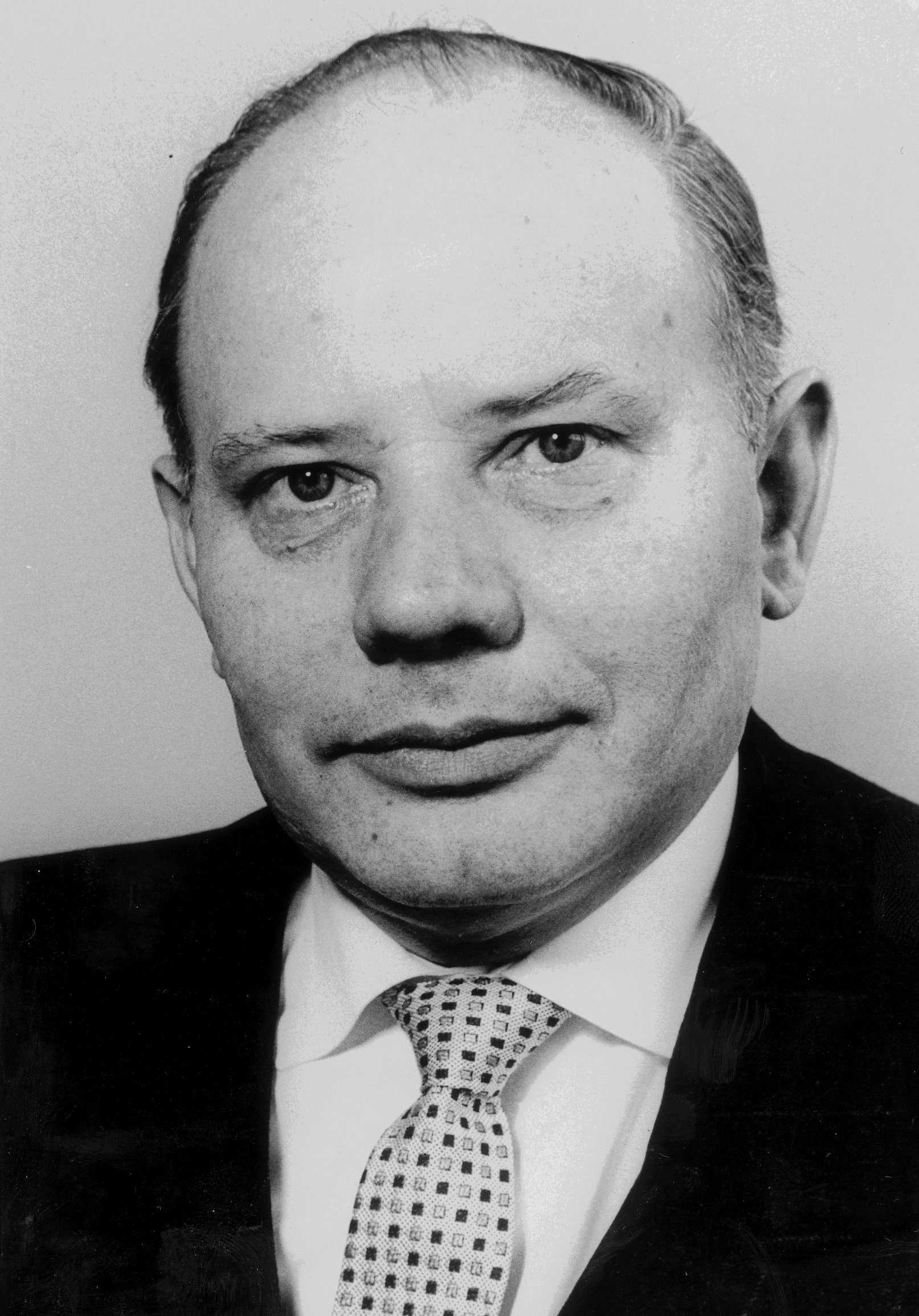
- Blank as Minister of Defence

Federal Minister for Labour and Social Affairs (West Germany)
- In office 29 October 1957 – 26 October 1965
- Chancellor: Konrad Adenauer
- Preceded by: Anton Storch
- Succeeded by: Hans Katzer

Federal Minister of Defence (West Germany)
- In office 7 June 1955 – 16 October 1956
- Chancellor: Konrad Adenauer
- Succeeded by: Franz Josef Strauss

Deputy Chairman of the CDU/CSU Parliamentary Group in the Bundestag (West Germany)
- In office 19 October 1965 – 20 October 1969

Member of the Bundestag (West Germany)
- In office 7 September 1949 – 21 April 1972

Personal details
- Born: 19 September 1905 Elz, Hesse-Nassau, Kingdom of Prussia, German Empire
- Died: 14 May 1972 (aged 66) Bonn, West Germany
- Party: CDU (1945 until his death)
- Education: Leibniz University Hannover

Theodor Anton Blank (19 September 1905 – 14 May 1972) was a German politician of the CDU. He was one of the founders of the CDU in 1945.

== Early life ==
Blank was born on 19 September 1905 in Elz an der Lahn. He was the third of ten children of a carpenter and Margarete Blank (née Eufinger). His family was Roman Catholic. In 1913, the family moved to Dahlhausen, and after elementary and technical school, he received an apprenticeship as a carpenter. During the beginning of his internship, he joined the Christian trade unions, influenced by his father.

From 1930 to 1933, he worked as a trade union secretary at the Association of Christian Transport and Factory Employees of the Northern and Northwestern Ruhr Area. In 1933, he was dismissed from the position following the implementation of the Enabling Act of 1933, which banned free trade unions. Other versions stated that the Reich Ministry of Labor had offered him a huge salary and a major position, but he declined, which led to his expulsion. Blank passed his Abitur in 1936 and studied mathematics at the University of Münster. However, due to financial difficulties, he left Münster and took up work for Junkers in Dessau, but eventually returned to Dortmund to work as a designer of mine fans. Following this, he returned to school, but instead studied engineering sciences at Leibniz University Hannover. In 1939 he was conscripted to the Wehrmacht and became a first lieutenant at the end of World War II. He won one battlefield commission for bravery when he was deployed as part of the French Campaign in 1940, but was later deployed to the Soviet Union and then fought during the Battle of the Bulge. At the end of the war, in 1945, he was captured north of Dachau by the U.S. 7th Army, and was briefly held as a prisoner of war.

== Political career ==
From 1949 to 1972 he was a member of the German Bundestag, in which he served from 1965 to 1969 as deputy chief of CDU/CSU-Bundestagsfraktion.

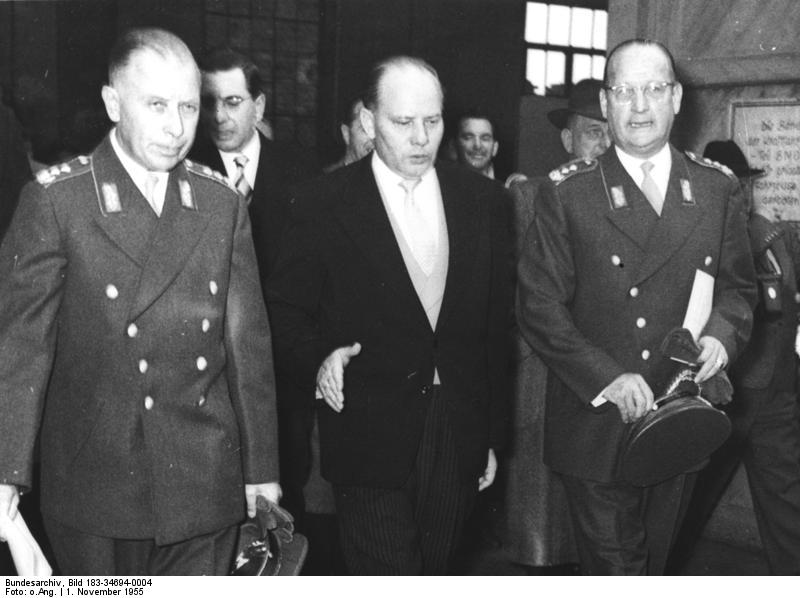
Blank (center) with Bundeswehr Generals Hans Speidel and Adolf Heusinger

From 1950 to 1955 he served as Special Representative of the Chancellor, leading the "Amt Blank" (Blank Agency), officially responsible for affairs relating to the Allied occupying troops, but in reality mainly charged by Chancellor Konrad Adenauer with covertly preparing the re-establishment of the German armed forces. In 1954, opponents of the rearmament prevented him from speaking to public assemblies by yelling and shouting, and lightly wounded him in one instance. After the rearmament was official, he served as the first postwar Defence Minister of Germany from 1955 to 1956 and as Minister of Labour and Social Affairs from 1957 to 1965.

Blank died in Bonn.

Political offices
| Preceded by (none) | Federal Minister of Defence (Germany); 1955 – 1956 | Succeeded by Franz-Josef Strauss |
