= Adolf Heusinger =

German military officer (1897–1982)

General Adolf Heusinger
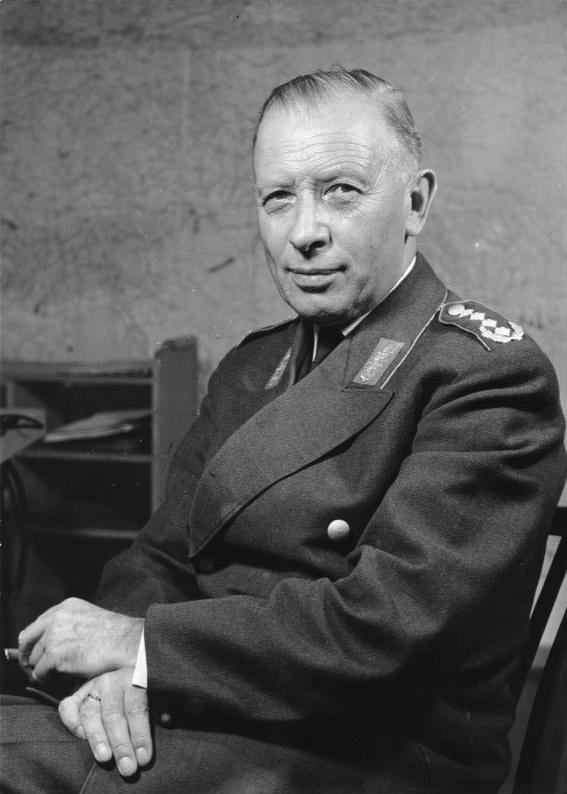
- Heusinger, c. 1960

Chairman of the NATO Military Committee
- In office April 1961 – 1 April 1964
- Preceded by: Charles Cumont
- Succeeded by: Charles Cumont

Inspector General of the Bundeswehr
- In office 1 June 1957 – 31 March 1961
- Chancellor: Konrad Adenauer
- Preceded by: Office established
- Succeeded by: Friedrich Foertsch

Chief of the German Army High Command
- Acting
- In office 10 June 1944 – 21 July 1944
- Führer: Adolf Hitler
- Preceded by: Kurt Zeitzler
- Succeeded by: Heinz Guderian

Personal details
- Born: Adolf Bruno Heinrich Ernst Heusinger; 4 August 1897 Holzminden, Duchy of Brunswick, German Empire
- Died: 30 November 1982 (aged 85) Cologne, North Rhine-Westphalia, West Germany
- Spouse: Gerda Luise Krüger (m. 1931)
- Children: 2

Military service
- Allegiance: German Empire (1915–1918); Kingdom of Prussia; Weimar Republic (1920–1933); Nazi Germany (1933–1945); West Germany
- Branch/service: Imperial German Army; Prussian Army; Reichswehr; German Army; Bundeswehr
- Years of service: 1915–1945; 1955–1964
- Rank: Lieutenant General General
- Battles/wars: World War I; World War II
- Awards: War Merit Cross; Wound Badge of 20 July 1944 in silver

Adolf Bruno Heinrich Ernst Heusinger (a.k.a. Adolf Horn while in Gehlen Org.; 4 August 1897 – 30 November 1982) was a German military officer whose career spanned the German Empire, the Weimar Republic, Nazi Germany, West Germany and NATO.

He joined the Imperial German Army as a volunteer in 1915 and later became a professional soldier. He served as the Operations Chief within the general staff of the High Command of the German Army in the Wehrmacht from 1938 to 1944. He was then appointed acting Chief of the General Staff for two weeks in 1944 following Kurt Zeitzler's resignation. That year, despite his presence in the conference room where the bomb detonated, Heusinger was accused of involvement in the 20 July plot to assassinate Adolf Hitler, but was cleared by the People's Court.

Heusinger was later appointed head of the military cartography office when the war ended. Despite his alleged knowledge and participation in war crimes, he later became a General for West Germany and served as head of the West German military from 1957 to 1961 as well as Chairman of the NATO Military Committee from 1961 to 1964.

== Early life and career ==
Heusinger was born in Holzminden, in the Duchy of Brunswick, German Empire. He entered the Prussian Army in 1915 and became a Leutnant in 1916. After the end of the First World War (1918), Heusinger returned from British captivity in Yorkshire in December 1919 and in 1920 joined the Reichswehr of the Weimar Republic. In 1931, Heusinger was assigned to the operations staff of the Troop Office (Truppenamt) in the Ministry of the Reichswehr. (The Truppenamt functioned as the German Army's covert General Staff; its existence circumvented the 1919 Treaty of Versailles, which had forbidden the institution.) In August 1937, Heusinger was assigned to the Operations Staff of the re-established Army (OKH) General Staff of the Wehrmacht. He served there, was promoted to lieutenant colonel on 20 March 1939 and to colonel on 1 August 1940. He continued to serve in the OKH Operations Staff, and on 15 October 1940 became OKH Operations Chief.

== Second World War ==
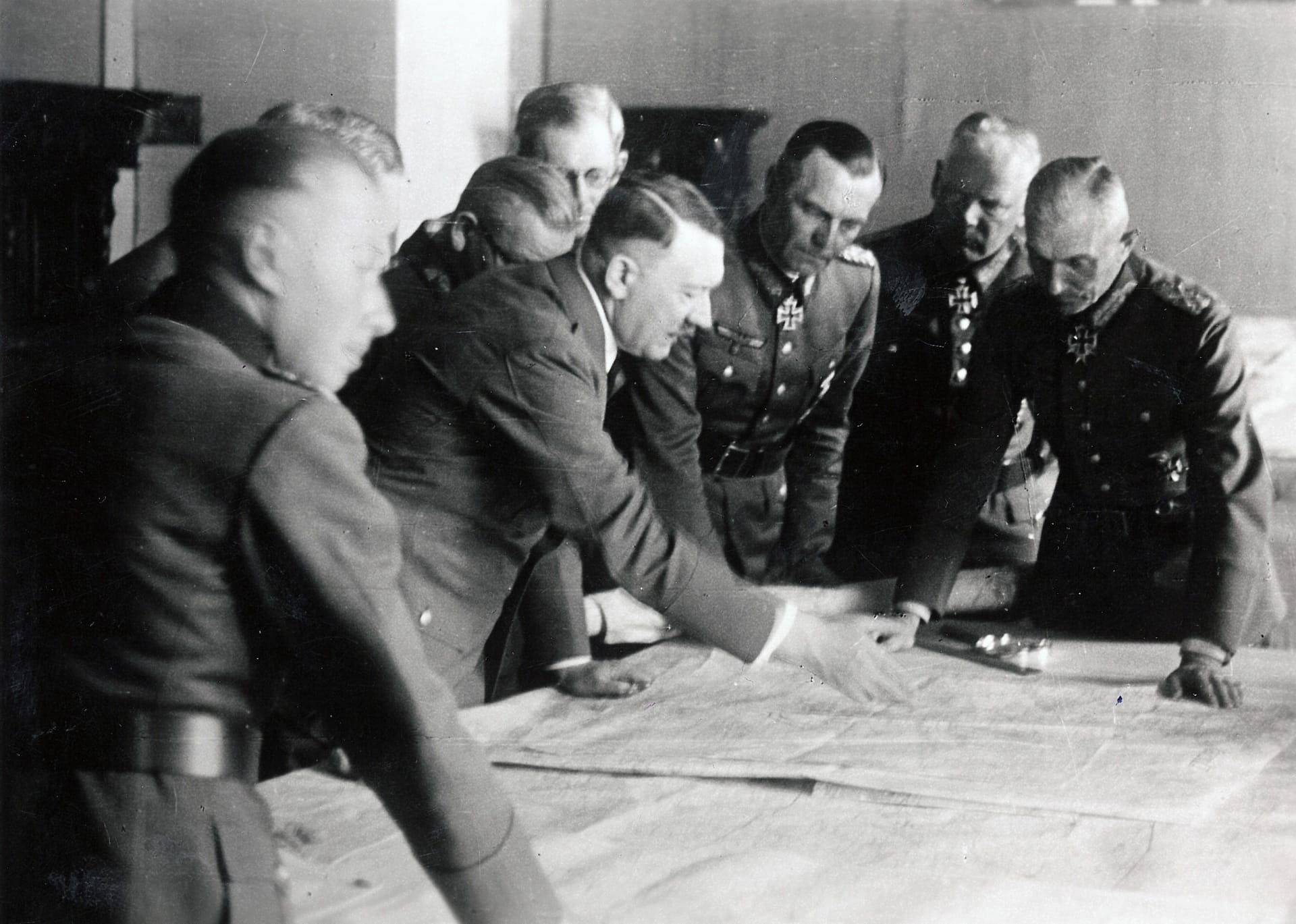
Heusinger (front left) attending a briefing with Adolf Hitler on 1 June 1942

With the outbreak of the Second World War, the German Army High Command (the OKH) assumed its wartime organisation. Heusinger accompanied the field staff and assisted in the planning of operations for the invasions of Poland, Denmark, Norway, and France and the Low Countries. He was promoted to colonel on 1 August 1940 and became chief of the Operationsabteilung in October 1940, which made him number three in the army's planning hierarchy, after the Chief of the General Staff, General Franz Halder, and the Deputy Chief of the General Staff/Chief Quartermaster, General Friedrich Paulus.

After the invasion of the Soviet Union in June 1941, the OKH became responsible primarily for planning operations in that theatre, and the Armed Forces High Command (Oberkommando der Wehrmacht, or OKW) was responsible for other theatres. Halder was replaced as Chief of the General Staff in September 1942 by General Kurt Zeitzler. Heusinger remained chief of the Operationsabteilung and was promoted to Generalleutnant on 1 January 1943. In June 1944, Zeitzler suffered a nervous breakdown and abandoned his post, and on 10 June, Heusinger temporarily assumed his office as Chief of the General Staff of the Army. In this capacity, he attended the meeting at Hitler's Wolf's Lair on 20 July 1944, and he was standing next to Hitler when the bomb exploded that had been planted by Claus von Stauffenberg.

Heusinger was hospitalised for his injuries in the explosion, but was later arrested and interrogated by the Gestapo to determine his role, if any, in the 20 July plot. Although there was evidence that Heusinger had contacts with many of the conspirators, like all other high-ranking Wehrmacht military leaders, there was no evidence to connect him to the plot, and he was released in October 1944. According to Heusinger's own autobiography, he published an essay ("Denkschrift"), which Hitler received very positively. Heusinger made available all information that he had on the conspirators who had plotted against the Führer. He reaffirmed that he had not participated in the assassination plot since he still felt an obligation to fulfil his duty as a soldier of the German Reich, despite his personal view that the war had been lost. After his release, he was placed into the Führerreserve, a reserve army of high-ranking German military leaders awaiting assignments, and was not assigned to another position until 25 March 1945, when he was made chief of armed forces mapping department (Chef Wehrmacht-Kartenwesen). He was later taken prisoner by the Western Allies in May 1945.

== Postwar ==
A prisoner from 1945 to 1947, Heusinger testified during the Nuremberg trials.

In 1950, he became an advisor on military matters to Konrad Adenauer, the first Chancellor of West Germany. He served in the Blank Office Amt Blank, the office headed by Theodor Blank, which became the West German Ministry of Defence in 1955.

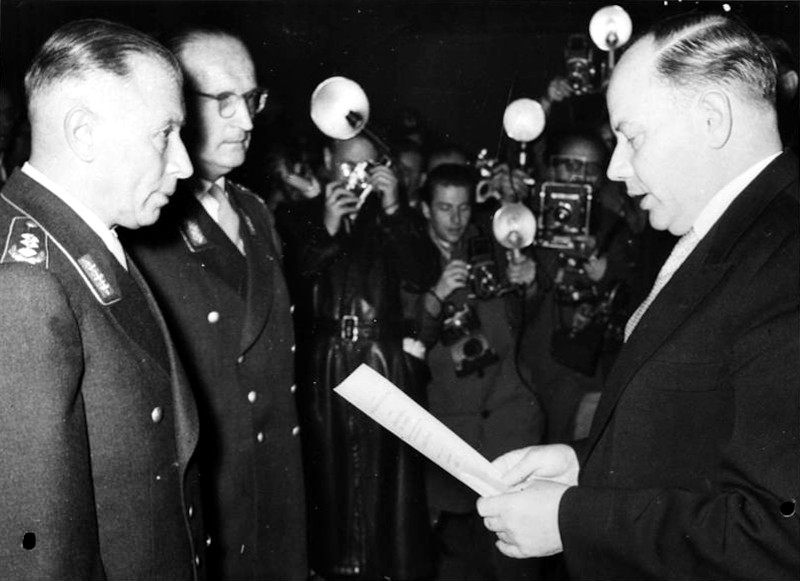
Heusinger and Hans Speidel were sworn into the newly-founded Bundeswehr on 12 November 1955.

With the establishment of the West Germany Armed Forces Bundeswehr in 1955, Heusinger returned to military service. He was appointed a Generalleutnant (lieutenant general) on 12 November 1955, in the Bundeswehr and chairman of the Military Leadership Council (Militärischer Führungsrat).

In March 1957, he succeeded Hans Speidel as chief of the all-armed forces department (Chef der Abteilung Gesamtstreitkräfte).

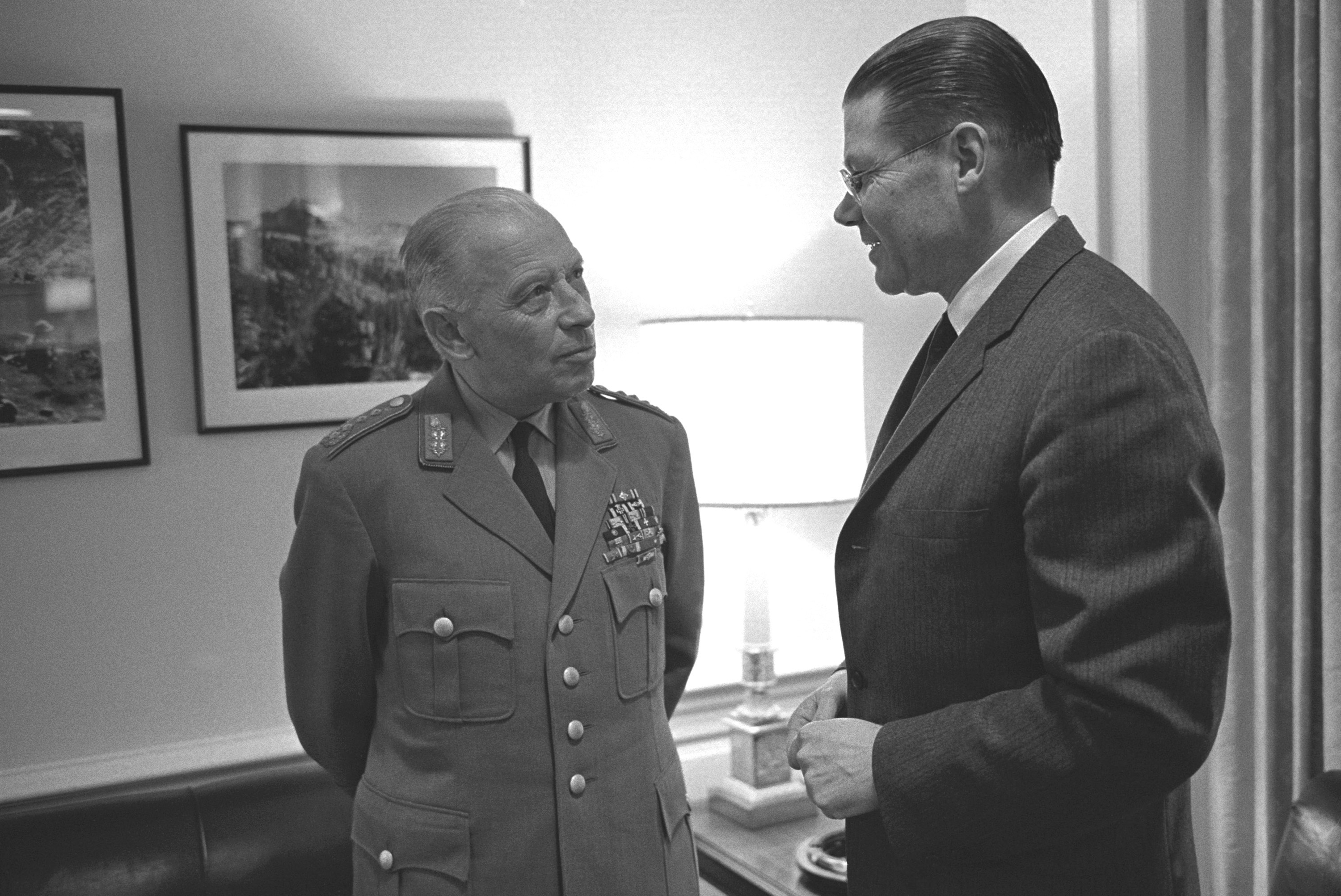
Heusinger with Robert McNamara in Washington, DC, 1964

Shortly thereafter, in June 1957, Heusinger was promoted to full general and named the first Inspector General of the Bundeswehr (Generalinspekteur der Bundeswehr), and he served in that capacity until March 1961. In April 1961, he was appointed Chairman of the NATO Military Committee in Washington, D.C., where he served until 1964 when he retired. He was, according to news reports, wanted by the Soviet Union in the early 1960s for alleged war crimes committed in the occupied Soviet territories. The Soviet Union claimed that he "bore responsibility for the systematic killings of civilians in Belarus as part of antipartisan operations" during the war. The fact that he never faced prosecution was highlighted in Soviet publications such as Sovetskaia Belorussiia.

Heusinger died in Cologne on 30 November 1982, aged 85.

According to documents released by the German Federal Intelligence Service in 2014, Heusinger may have been part of the Schnez-Truppe, a secret army that veterans of the Wehrmacht and Waffen-SS sought to establish in the early 1950s in order to safeguard against a threat posed by East Germany.

== Awards and decorations ==
- Iron Cross (1914) 1st and 2nd Class
- Wound Badge 1918 in Black
- Clasp to the Iron Cross (1939) 1st and 2nd Class
- Princely Reuss Honour Cross 3rd Class with Swords
- Princely Reuss Silver Merit Medal with Swords
- War Merit Cross 2nd Class (Brunswick)
- Honour Cross of the World War 1914/1918 (First World War service medal)
- Wound Badge of 20 July 1944 in silver
- War Merit Cross (1939), 1st and 2nd Class with Swords
- Wehrmacht Long Service Award, 2nd Class
- Large Merit Cross of the Merit Order of the Federal Republic of Germany with Star and Sash
- Commander of the United States Legion of Merit
- Commander's Cross of the Order of the Crown of Italy
- Commander's Cross of the Order of Merit of the Kingdom of Hungary
- Order of the Cross of Liberty 1st Class with Swords (Finland)

== Sources ==
- Searle, Alaric (2003). Wehrmacht Generals, West German Society, and the Debate on Rearmament, 1949–1959. Westport, CT: Praeger Publishers. ISBN 978-0-275-97968-3.

Military offices
Preceded by Kurt Zeitzler	Chief of the General Staff of the Army High Command; 10 June 1944–21 July 1944	Succeeded by Heinz Guderian
New title	Inspector General of the Federal Armed Forces; 1 June 1957–31 March 1961	Succeeded by General Friedrich Foertsch
Preceded by Charles Cumont	Chairman of the NATO Military Committee; April 1961–1 April 1964	Succeeded by Charles Cumont
