= Fibag scandal =

1961-62 West German political corruption scandal

Franz Josef Strauss on 10 November 1961

The Fibag scandal was in 1961/1962 a West German political scandal around minister of defense Franz Josef Strauss, which, together with the Starfighter scandal and the Spiegel scandal, led to Strauss' dismissal as defense minister and halted his political career at least temporarily.

In 1961, the weekly magazine Der Spiegel reported that Franz Josef Strauss, minister of defense in Konrad Adenauer's cabinet, had advised his American colleague, Thomas Gates, to contract the company Fibag (Finanzbau Aktiengesellschaft) for construction of several thousand apartments for the American military in Germany. He was accused of corruption, because Hans Kapfinger, a friend of Strauss', was a share holder of the company. After a motion by the SPD a parliamentary commission was formed in order to investigate the accusations. In 1962, this commission came to the decision that Strauss was not guilty of misconduct, which was criticized heavily by the FDP, partner of the CDU/CSU coalition in the government.
