= Sachsensumpf =

Slang name for an unresolved scandal in Saxony

Location of Saxony within Germany

Sachsensumpf (German: [ˈzaksn̩ˌzʊmpf]; "Saxony swamp") is the name given by journalists to a political, judicial and intelligence scandal in the German state of Saxony climaxing in 2007 when domestic intelligence dossiers about the purported implication of judicial and business figures in cases of child prostitution and illegal property deals during the early 1990s became public, raising the suspicion of parts of the state's government and judiciary being corrupted by criminal networks.

According to the investigating authorities and the majority in the state's parliament, no substantial evidence for the existence of such criminal and corruptible networks could be found. They assert that the (now disbanded) organized crime office at the state's domestic intelligence service and its main source, a Leipzig police detective, had overstated the suspected cases in an unprofessional way, and some journalists had further exaggerated the facts. The opposition and some media still had doubts about the official explanation, even after a parliamentary inquiry committee had completed its work. Former victims of child prostitution as well as journalists reporting on the case have been charged with libel but were eventually acquitted, raising warnings by press freedom advocates.

== Background ==
The Sachsensumpf scandal involves several criminal cases dating back to the 1990s. Whether or not they are connected with each other is a matter of debate.

One of the cases that was believed to be connected was the child prostitution case of an illegal brothel in Western Leipzig, named "Jasmin", where the pimp and former boxer Michael W. Alias Martin Kugler exploited eight girls aged 13 to 19 for sexual services in 1992 and early 1993. The brothel, which was hidden in a flat, was raided by the police on 28 January 1993. The Landgericht (district court) of Leipzig convicted Kugler of human trafficking, in coincidence with pimping, promotion of prostitution and sexual abuse of children and sentenced him to four years and two months in prison.

Another case was the attempted murder of Martin Klockzin in October 1994, then head of the legal department of the Leipzig Housing Company (Leipziger Wohnungs- und Baugesellschaft, LWB). The LWB is the successor to the former state-owned housing enterprise that administered all flats in Leipzig during an East Germany's communist era, until being privatized after Germany's reunification.

Several years later, in 1999 and 2000, detective chief inspector Georg Wehling, head of the K26 office, the unit responsible for organized crime investigation at Leipzig's criminal investigation department, re-investigated the Klockzin murder attempt, identifying the hitmen's employers who were real estate agents from Bavaria. In the course of the investigation, Wehling found that these estate agents had also blackmailed Klockzin by threatening to reveal his "child molesting". This aroused Wehling's suspicion that Klockzin might have been a client of the "Jasmin" brothel and he also re-opened that child prostitution case.

== History of the affair ==
The still unsolved affair goes back to what the former forced prostitutes said when being interviewed again by the police in 2000. They claim that the former vice president of the Leipzig's Country Court (Landgericht), who was their judge in the trial of 1994, Jürgen Niemeyer, was one of the visitors of the brothel. The women further claim that Norbert Röger, at the time a public prosecutor in Leipzig, was another visitor of the brothel. Since January 2011, he is President of the Country Court in Chemnitz (Landgericht Chemnitz). The policemen who conducted the interrogation later refused to speak publicly about it.

In 2003 a department for organized crime (OK) was established in the Saxony State Office for the Protection of the Constitution (Landesamt für Verfassungsschutz Sachsen - LfV). Certain investigations of this unit, which were internally registered under the name 'offside' (German 'Abseits'), had alleged mafia structures in Leipzig as focus. These included suspected illegal property transactions in the 1990s, prostitution, blackmail and cross-links between political, judicial and criminal persons. This part was also associated with the assassination attempt on Klockzin in 1994. From 2004 to 2006 the unit assembled files of 15.600 pages.

The jurisdiction of a domestic intelligence agency investigating organized crime was controversial from the start as in Germany this is normally part of specialized police units. In July 2005 the Saxony Constitutional Court (sächsischer Verfassungsgerichtshof) declared that the 'State Constitution Protection Act' (Landesverfassungsschutzgesetz) of the time was partly unconstitutional and thus limited the admissibility of observation of organized crime by the department.

On 12 August 2005, a government report was issued. It assessed the situation and concluded that 'the aspect of a danger for the constitution and the free, basic democratic order in Germany [...] in all case complexes was given'. On the basis of this report the former Minister of the Interior, Thomas de Maizière, decided that the observation of organized crime, including the case of complex 'offside' by the domestic intelligence agency, will continue. The report from August indicates, that the Saxony State Office for the Protection of the Constitution (LfV) knew of alleged sexual abuse of children at the hands of known prosecutors and judges by the second quarter of 2005.

In March 2006, the Data Protection Supervisor (Datenschutzbeauftragter) of the Free State of Saxony, Andreas Schurig, launched a review into how the department for organized crime (OK) still collected data as it only had a limited mandate to monitor organized crime. He concluded that the documents were collected illegally and should be destroyed.

In a speech at a special meeting of the Saxony parliament on 5 June 2007, the Minister for the Interior Mr. Buttolo confirmed the existence of active and dangerous criminal networks in Saxony in a speech that became known as the 'Mafia-Speech'. The General Attorney's Office of Germany (Bundesanwaltschaft) was informed and looked into the issue, but in June 2007 declared that there was no reasonable suspicion for the existence of a criminal organization or network. The Prosecuting Attorney's Office of Dresden (Staatsanwaltschaft Dresden) began an investigation into Judge Jürgen Niemeyer on the basis of obstruction of justice between the end of June to early July 2007. It received intelligence files from 'offside III' complex.

On the 26 August 2007, two months after his 'Mafia-Speech', Albrecht Buttolo distanced himself from what was said in that speech. An internal investigation against Henneck was initiated. Chief prosecutor Christian Avenarius, spokesman for the Prosecuting Attorney's Office of Dresden (Staatsanwaltschaft Dresden), said that the material from the police officer hardly contained any reliable facts that would make legal proceedings reasonable. At the time, he had completely trusted the accuracy of the material. Now, under the given circumstances of significant errors in the interpretation the material however, he considers the information questionable. Data collection and data analysis was put together and a check for the credibility of the information has not been made, with many references being false or overstated.

An external review committee, headed by the retired Federal Court judge(Bundesgerichtshof) Dietrich Beyer, stated in its interim report that there were serious deficiencies at Saxony's State Office for the Protection of the Constitution, particularly with the department for organized crime (OK). Intelligence service regulations had been violated to a significant extent, the supervision of the department had been neglected by both the board of directors as well as the Ministry of the Interior (Innenministerium). Members of the unit had insufficient intelligence training for obtaining information, and policemen from the mid-level service had been used.

In a 2008 lawsuit, the two girls who were forced into prostitution declared that the high-level lawyers of Leipzig were their punters in the Jasmine. The convicted pimp Martin Kugler testified that his lawyer back then agreed with the court on a lenient sentence, provided that Kugler will not wash 'dirty linen'. However, this assertion was later revoked by Kugler. The Public Prosecutor's Office (Staatsanwaltschaft) gave no credibility to the testimony of the women and cancelled the investigation against the lawyers; both lawyers received compensation from the state of Saxony. The investigating officers were shifted, the commissariat K26 was dissolved. In addition, several legal proceedings against Georg Wehling, the former head of K26 were initiated, and he was suspended from duty. These proceedings were mostly closed, one ended in acquittal.

A lawsuit was initiated on 15 December 2011 against the former forced prostitutes who testified as witnesses in the trial against the lawyers on the basis of libel. That process was officially opened on 6 March 2012, and ended on the third day without sentencing on the advice of a psychologist.

=== Investigation committee ===
A connection with the inconsistencies on the so-called 'ownerless properties', which were sold in Leipzig in the hundreds in the previous few years, has not been demonstrated, but is examined by a group of parliamentarians of the Saxony parliament. It is checked whether the same group of people involved in that do play a role in the Saxony morass as well. Mayor Jung was citing an evaluation from which making these files public would be unlawful, because they are not part of the investigation.

Simone Skroch (formerly Henneck), former Head of the department organized crime at the LfV, confirmed as a key witness in the investigation committee of the 'Landtag' (legislative assembly in Germany) beginning in March 2013, that the "existence of continuously acting structures of the former Ministry of State Security (Ministerium für Staatssicherheit - MfS / DDR) in complex connection with organized crime" is given. On 2 July 2014, the political parties of SPD, Greens and the Left proclaimed their findings on the 'Saxony morass'. They stated that there was no viable evidence for the existence 'of a corrupt network'. However, they complained that the government had not seriously run the enlightenment of the affair, but had instead prevented it.

== Coverage and legal consequences ==
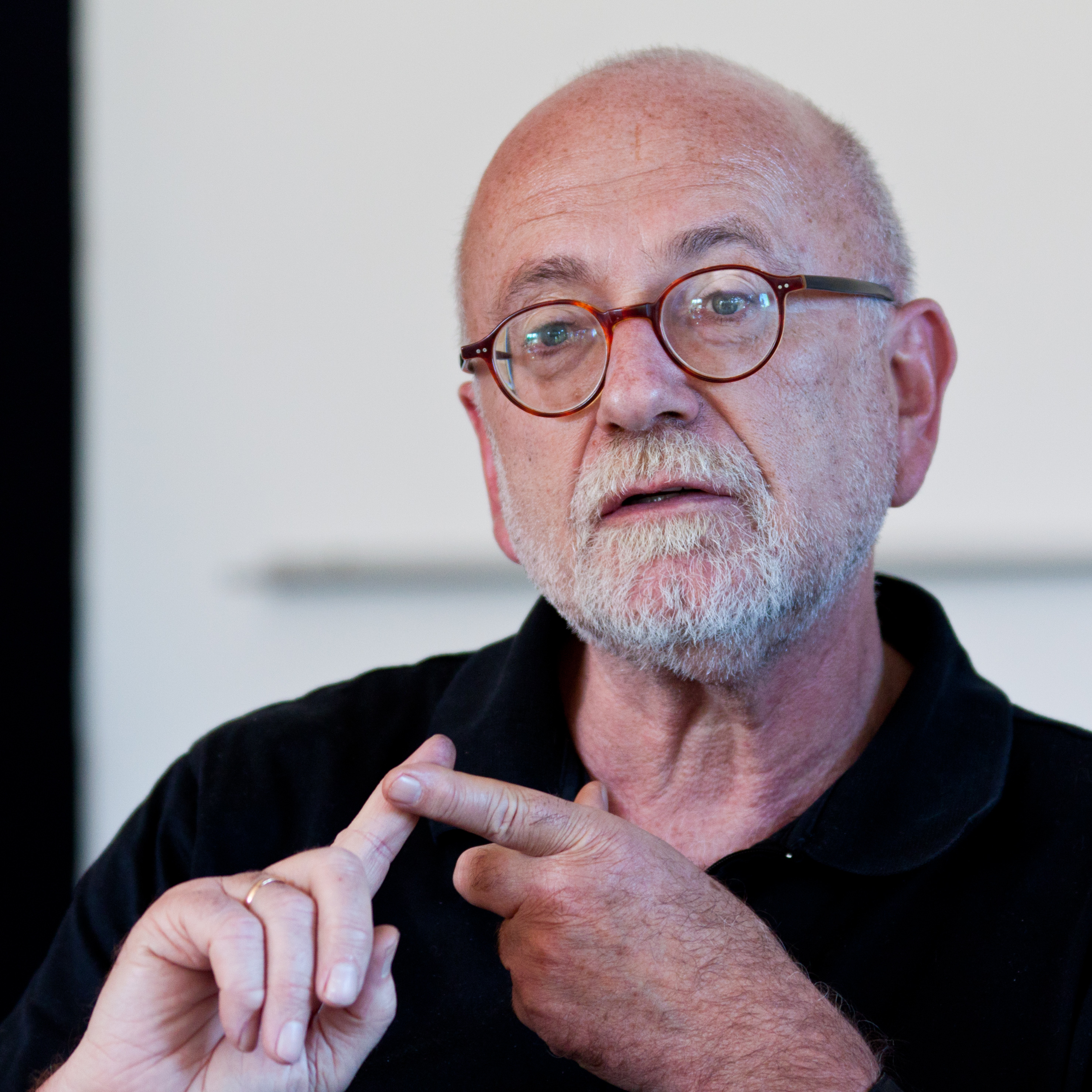
Journalist Jürgen Roth (2011 photograph) reported on the 'swamp' in 2007.

In the summer of 2007, Jürgen Roth reported on the 'Saxony morass' affair (suspicion of involvement in mafia-like structures from high politicians, lawyers, policemen and journalists). For his covering Roth was severely criticised by journalist Reiner Burger in a series of articles in the FAZ (Frankfurter Allgemeine Zeitung). Burger demonstrated that Roth has not spoken with affected people directly, as example. In this context, Roth had to retract statements on his website about a businessman. The district court in Dresden sentenced him in early 2008 to a fine for libel. A critical comment on the situation from Jürgen Roth was published on the website 'mafialand.de'.

The investigative committee of the Saxony Landtag in 2009 came to no conclusive result on the Saxony morass. CDU and FDP party saw it as disproven, Greens and The Left could find no evidence supporting or disproving it. There are individual politicians that see the situation as very critical and who are in favor for further investigation of the affair and criminal networks in Saxony.

The journalists Arndt Ginzel and Thomas Datt reported in the German 'Spiegel' and 'Zeit Online' on the case. Both were accused of libel and defamation. Amongst other accusations, they were accused of defamatory allegations against the Saxon lawyers. On 10 December 2012 the Regional Court reversed that ruling. The presiding judge Martin Schultze-Griebler took the view, that under established practice of the higher law, media utterances are to be seen in context of the situation. Finally, after the General Attorney of the Free State of Saxony has withdrawn a previously given objection, that ruling is legally valid.

Jana Simon and Sigrid Reinichs of the 'Zeitmagazin' were again reporting on the topic by covering the libel trial against the women that were forced into prostitution. They especially shined a light on the situation of Mandy Kopp, who was forced into prostitution at age 16 in the brothel. In November 2008 Beatrice E., who was forced to 'work' in the brothel alongside Mandy Kopp, was accused of libel as well. Both accused Jürgen Niemeyer of being a visitor to the brothel in the 90s. That process was discontinued in October 2013. The Annual Report 2012/13 from Reporters Without Borders called the lawsuit against journalists in the 'Saxony morass' as one of five reasons for a slightly deteriorated assessment of press freedom in Germany (at that time 17th place among 179 countries on the global rankinglist).

Martin Klockzin started a lawsuit against a report in the online edition of the 'Stern' magazine on 22 June 2007 which was released under the title 'The Saxony corruption scandal: A thriller from Leipzig's morass'. He had success against the publisher, the journalist, and his own former secretary. He demanded the payment of compensation for infringement of his personality rights. The opinion of the final ruling was that the report in the magazine was one-sided in favor for the view of his former secretary. Klockzin rejected the request for an interview on the issue in the first place. However, he was not informed what exactly the allegations were, which were noted in the article. It was not possible to prove these allegations and therefore he was unlawfully insulted in his honor. The Lausitzer Rundschau published an article on 3 July 2014, titled: 'Saxony morass affair: Clear is as good as nothing'. The report was about the end of the process, citing John Lichdi of the political party 'The Greens': 'The investigation against the accused prosecutors and judges was never operated seriously and was handled to end with no decent result from the beginning.'

Welt am Sonntag also published an article on the occasion of the final report from the investigative committee in October 2014. There it was noted, that many questions do remain unanswered. It is remarkable how hard the Saxony's judicial authorities pushed against those - especially journalists - who doubted the official explanation and still believed in the existence of criminal structures.

== Literature ==
- Gunter Pirntke: Black Morass in Saxony: A cartel of corruption and cover-up' - 'Schwarzer Sumpf in Sachsen: Ein Kartell aus Korruption und Vertuschung Grin Verlag, München 2012, erweiterte, aktualisierte Ausgabe, ISBN 978-3-640-45067-1
- Mandy Kopp: The time of silence is over' - 'Die Zeit des Schweigens ist vorbei Berlin: Marion von Schröder Verlag 2013, ISBN 978-3547711929

== Other sources ==
- "Wie die Justiz Mandy Kopp stigmatisierte". SPIEGEL. 2013.
- Sachsensumpf, Mafialand
- Viele Widersprüche im "Sachsensumpf"-Prozess, Zeit Online 2012
- Der Sachsen-Sumpf ist ausgetrocknet, Frankfurter Allgemeine 2008
