= Josef Schejbal =

Czechoslovak war pilot and modern pentathlete

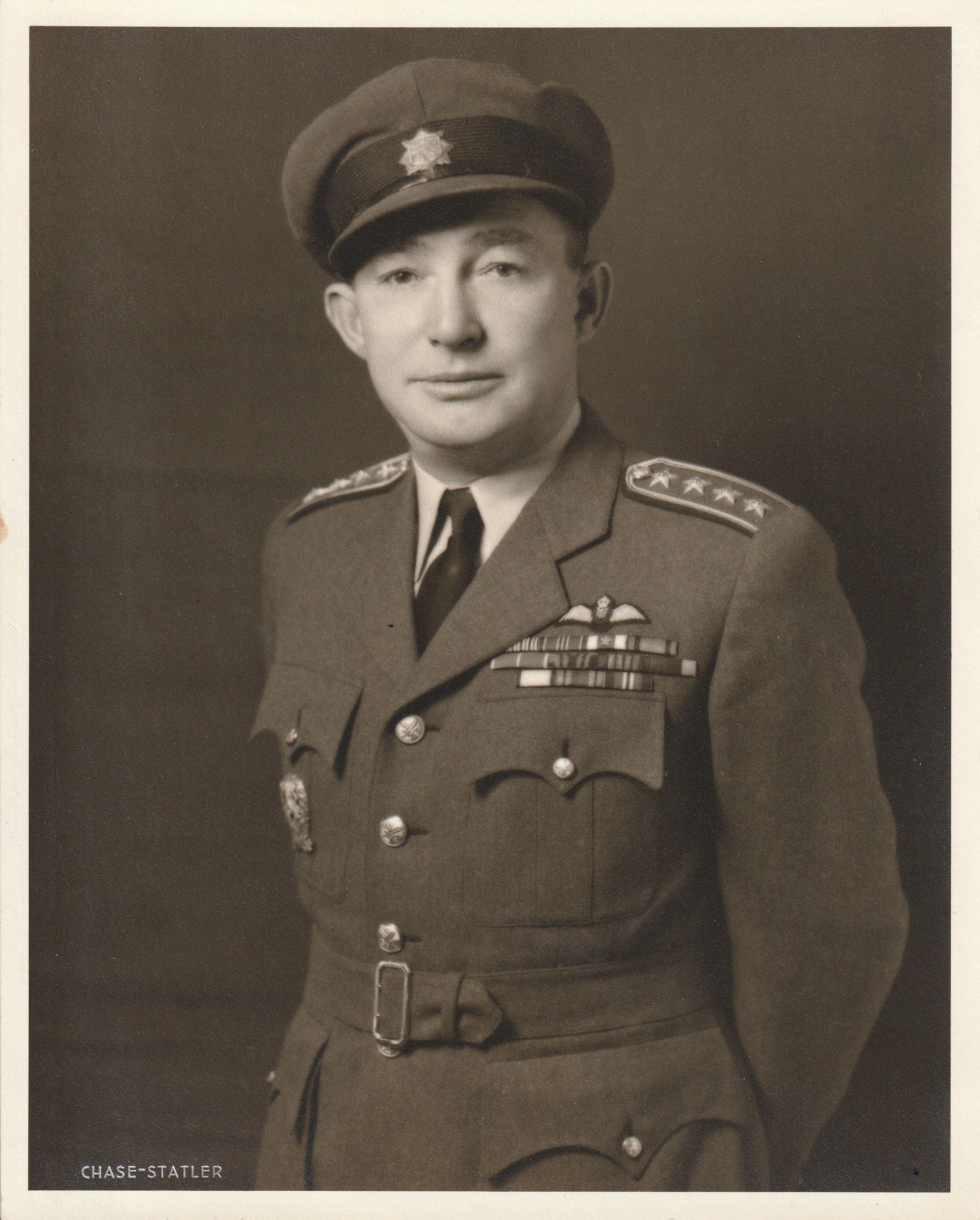
- Josef Schejbal in 1949

Personal information
- Born: 19 June 1903 Hum, Trebinje, Bosnia and Herzegovina
- Died: 9 February 1963 (aged 59) Washington, D.C.

Sport
- Sport: Modern pentathlon

Josef Schejbal (19 June 1903 – 9 February 1963) was a Czech fighter pilot. He also competed for Czechoslovakia in modern pentathlon at the 1928 Summer Olympics.
