= Bavaria casino scandal =

Political intrigue in Bavaria, Germany

The Bavaria casino scandal refers to the political intrigue in Bavaria, Germany, following the Bavarian Landtag's decision to issue casino licenses to private individuals between 1955 and 1962. Accusations of corruption decimated the Bavaria Party, which has been shut out of the Landtag since 1966.

== Background ==
In the elections of December 1946, the two largest parties in the Bavarian Landtag were the Christian Social Union (CSU) and Social Democratic Party of Germany (SPD), with 52.3% and 28.6% of the vote respectively. While the Bavaria Party was founded in 1946 but it only was approved for elections by the American occupation in 1948. Made up of Bavarian independence activists, monarchists, and hyper-regionalists, the BP appealed to the conservative base of the CSU. With the next elections in 1950, the BP entered the Landtag with 17.9%, as the CSU's vote share fell to 27.4% and the SPD remained relatively stable at 28%.

After the 1954 elections, Wilhelm Hoegner of the SPD served as Minister President of Bavaria for the second time by crafting a four-party coalition, which included the Bavaria Party (BP) against the CSU. The CSU, which with 38% had the largest vote share, became the only party in the opposition. Hoegner had previously served from 1945-46 and remains to this day the sole non-CSU Minister President of postwar Bavaria.

== Beginning of the scandal (1955-57) ==
On April 21, 1955, the state parliament, spurred by the BP, passed legislation allowing the granting of casino licenses. As a result, casinos opened in Bad Kissingen, Bad Reichenhall, Garmisch-Partenkirchen, and Bad Wiessee. Soon, rumors began to emerge that these licenses were obtained through bribery and that politicians were accepting large payoffs from casino lobbyists. The Abendzeitung in Munich reported that a parliamentary committee was formed to investigate bribery in connection with the licensing of Simon Gembicki for the casino in Bad Kissingen.

Alois Hundhammer (CSU) functioned as chairperson of the 1955/56 investigative committee, since members in high positions of the four-party coalition were involved in the allegations, including Minister of the Interior August Geislhöringer (BP) and Deputy Minister President and Minister of Agriculture Joseph Baumgartner (BP). Baumgartner was previously a founding member of the CSU, before switching parties in 1948. The investigative committee was not successful in finding any evidence of wrongdoing. As a result, the Hoegner government pronounced that Geislhöringer, the minister responsible for the licenses in question, did nothing wrong and successfully filed defamation lawsuits against his accusers.

However, the CSU-led committee's needling questions were successful in casting doubt on the integrity of Baumgartner and Geislhöringer, even while confirming most of their statements. Rudolf Hanauer (CSU) had asked if Baumgartner had close personal ties to any of the applicants, which Baumgartner denied. However, he had contact to August Freisehner, a trained butcher, holder of various odd-jobs, and passionate roulette player from Gmünd, Austria who had lobbied for casino licenses for years. Due to a prior conviction, Freisehner was disqualified from holding a license, but his son-in-law, a dentist, successfully applied for a license for the casino in the Bad Reichenhall under his guidance. Hundhammer revealed that interior minister Geislhöringer had seen reports stating Gembicki was a liar and conman from the Bavarian Office for the Protection of the Constitution, which similar to the local bureaus of the American FBI is part of Germany's domestic intelligence agency which investigates organized crime and other constitutional-level offenses. After Hundhammer asked if Geislhöringer had known of any unfavorable information regarding Gembicki, Geislhöringer dismissed the content of the reports as hearsay. After the hearings, the CSU continued to search for damaging material and raise questions in the press about the casino issue, ultimately calling for the Bavarian party to be pushed out of the state government. The Bavarian party became dogged by questions of bribery and corruption which threatened the coalition as a whole.

On October 8, 1957, Hoegner resigned as Minister President in tandem with his cabinet. Eight days later, Hanns Seidel (CSU) succeeded him with the backing of a coalition of the CSU, the Free Democratic Party (FDP), and the All-German Bloc/League of Expellees and Deprived of Rights (GB/BHE). The SPD and the Bavaria Party entered into the opposition.

== The Seidel government (1957-1960) ==
CSU made clear gains after the parliamentary elections of 1958, solidifying their mandate and increasing their control of the ruling coalition. Their electoral success increased skepticism that the CSU had manufactured the scandal to regain control of the Landtag, while the scandal around the BP continued to grow.

In 1959, Freisehner offered the then-general secretary of the CSU, Friedrich Zimmermann, proof of bribery payments made to the Bavarian Party minister. It later came to light that Zimmermann had negotiated a secret deal with Freisehner, offering him access to additional licenses in exchange for his cooperation. CSU co-founder Josef Müller kept Freisehner's written confession secret for several months. Following an ordinance mandating the merger of the casino businesses of Bad Wiessee and Garmisch-Partenkirchen, a lobbyist group connected to Freisehner was compensated for their company shares by the government.

== Court proceedings of 1959 ==
After Freisehner received his payout, his written confession surfaced in the district attorney's office and charges were filed against Baumgartner and Geislhöriger for perjury in connection to their statements before the parliamentary committee. The included receipts for the alleged bribery payments were evaluated by handwriting experts and deemed "most probably forged," but later regarded as authentic by the court. In the proceedings, which took place before the Landgericht München I (Munich State Court I), Baumgartner and Geislhöringer were depicted as revered and strong figureheads of the Bavaria Party.

It came out that Baumgartner was paid 2,900 DM between July 11, 1953 and November 2, 1954, and that he had long-standing business and familial connections with Freisehner, contradicting his previous claims. Geislhöriger, who claimed to have had no unfavorable knowledge of Gembicki during the committee hearings, was, however, aware that Gembicki, a Jew, was convicted of fleeing Nazi Germany in 1938 which was considered by the court as a criminal offense. Additionally, Max Klotz, the former deputy party whip of the Bavaria Party, was accused of receiving a total of 24,000 DM from Freisehner. Franz Michel, the former CSU parliamentary delegate, had stated that he did not exchange written correspondence with Gustavus regarding licensing applicants, but that was found to be untrue after copies of such letters were presented to the court. He also was found to have received a check for 50,000 DM from gambling lobbyists for introducing the first version of the gambling bill.

== Verdicts ==
On August 8, 1959, the court convicted several defendants of perjury. The former leader of the Bavaria Party, Joseph Baumgartner, was sentenced to two years in prison, and Max Klotz was sentenced to prison for two years and nine months.

Ex-Minister of the Interior Geislhöringer was convicted of perjury before the parliamentary committee and was sentenced to 15 months in jail; he was acquitted of accusations of bribery. Franz Michel received two years in prison. Karl Freisehner received 22 months in jail for perjury. On August 10, 1959, the Süddeutsche Zeitung (South German Newspaper) ran the headline: „Draconian punishments in casino trial“. Even former CSU minister president and attorney general Hans Ehard later called these verdicts “barbaric,” because “they should have allowed both politicians to admit to negligence before the investigative commission. It doesn’t really matter if he was wearing yellow or red boots.”

The CSU general secretary Friedrich Zimmerman, who was also accused in the casino scandal, was convicted of making negligent, false statements and was sentenced to a relatively mild four-month prison sentence. While testifying during the main trial, he denied contacting anyone other than Freisehner for damaging material. However, it was proven he had also asked Gembicki. On appeal, a court later repealed his sentence while admitting that “one cannot deny that the defendant’s guilt was clearly proven.” According to a medical report, he had debilitating hypoglycemia on the days of his unreliable statements and therefore suffered reduced mental capacity as a result of thyroid hyperactivity. According to Der Spiegel, Zimmerman himself told the expert assessor, that „the report was acquired by my defense; I saw it for the first time in the courtroom.“ As a result, Zimmerman received the nickname „Old Schwurhand“ (“old oath hand,” a play on the Winnetou character Old Surehand), which followed him for the rest of his life.

After six months, the Federal Supreme Court vacated the perjury verdicts against members of the government and requested a new trial. The verdict against Karl Freisehner remained legally valid.

== Consequences ==
Even today, the exact background of the casino scandal is considered only partially clarified and riddled with doubt. Due to Geislhöringer’s death, a new trial was not completed. Political observers saw the scandal as manufactured by the CSU in its power struggle with the Bavaria Party.

On August 11, 1960, the Bavarian Ministerial Council decided not to allow any more casinos in Bavaria and to allow the already-distributed licenses to expire in 1965 without extension. In February 1961, the Bavarian parliament, which had a CSU majority, decided to close the casinos. This decision was, however, never implemented, and four years later, the Free State of Bavaria nationalized the casinos. Private licensees and business owners were bought out in 1961.

== Further literature ==
- "Treff im Café Annast". Der Spiegel. No. 42. October 12, 1955. Archived from the original on June 17, 2013.
- "Das Spenden-Roulette". Der Spiegel. No. 22. May 27, 1959.
- "Weiße Manschetten". Der Spiegel. No. 6. February 3, 1960.
- "Die Meineid-Fälle". Der Spiegel. No. 10. March 2, 1960.
- "Sogenannte weiße Weste". Der Spiegel. No. 37. September 7, 1970.
- "Narren gefressen". Der Spiegel. No. 39. September 21, 1970.
- "Ungeheure Macht". Der Spiegel. No. 30. July 19, 1971.
- "Drei kleine Zettel". Der Spiegel. No. 17. April 22, 1974.
- "Gehandelt wie die sizilianische Mafia". Der Spiegel. No. 33. August 15, 1988.

== Links ==
- Bavarian Party on the Bavaria casino scandal (German)
