= Hans Speidel =

German military officer (1897–1984)

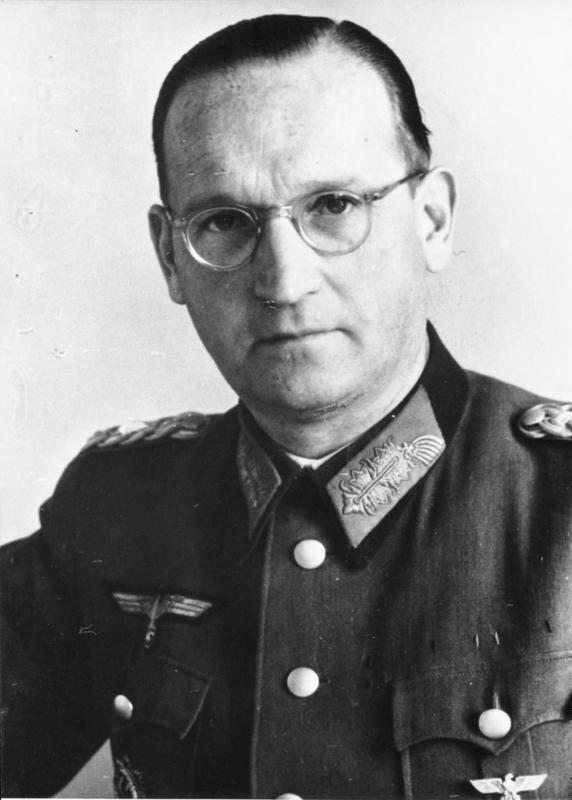
- Speidel in 1944
- Born: 28 October 1897; Metzingen, Kingdom of Württemberg, German Empire
- Died: 28 November 1984 (aged 87); Bad Honnef, North Rhine-Westphalia, West Germany
- Military career
- Allegiance: Germany; West Germany; NATO
- Branch: Army of Württemberg; Reichswehr; German Army; Bundeswehr
- Service years: 1914–1945; 1955–1963
- Rank: Generalleutnant; General
- Commands: NATO forces in Central Europe, 1957–1963
- Conflicts: World War I World War II
- Awards: Knight's Cross of the Iron Cross; Order of Merit of the Federal Republic of Germany
- Other work: President of the German Institute for International and Security Affairs

Hans Speidel (28 October 1897 – 28 November 1984) was a German general who successively served in the armies of the German Empire, Nazi Germany and West Germany. The first general officer of the Bundeswehr, he was a key player in West German rearmament during the Cold War as well as West Germany's integration into NATO and international negotiations on European and Western defence cooperation in the 1950s. He served as Commander of the Allied Land Forces Central Europe (COMLANDCENT) from 1957 to 1963 and then as President of the German Institute for International and Security Affairs from 1964.

Speidel joined the Imperial German Army in 1914, seeing action during World War I, and served in the Reichswehr during the interwar period. He served as chief of staff to Field Marshal Erwin Rommel during World War II and was promoted to lieutenant general in 1944. Speidel participated in the 20 July Plot to assassinate Hitler due to objecting to the racial policy of Nazi Germany, and he was tasked with recruiting Rommel for the resistance. After the plot failed he was arrested by the Gestapo. With the help of religious Pallottines, he was able to escape together with other prisoners and they were able to go into hiding in Urnau in today's Lake Constance district and were taken there by French troops in the last days of the war. Speidel was one of the few participants in the 20 July Plot to survive the war.

During the early Cold War, Speidel emerged as one of the major military leaders of West Germany, and played a key role in West Germany's rearmament, Western international negotiations on defence cooperation and West German integration into NATO. He is thus regarded as one of the founders of the Bundeswehr. He was appointed as the military advisor of Chancellor Konrad Adenauer in 1950 and joined the predecessor of the Federal Ministry of Defence in 1951, was the West German chief delegate to the conference on the Treaty establishing the European Defence Community from 1951 to 1954 and was a lead negotiator when West Germany joined NATO. In 1955 he became a director-general in the Federal Ministry of Defence with the military rank of lieutenant-general in the Bundeswehr, and in 1957 he became the first officer to be promoted to full General in West Germany. He served as COMLANDCENT from 1957 to 1963, with headquarters at the Palace of Fontainebleau in Paris.

Speidel was also a historian by training, taught at the University of Tübingen and wrote several books. He received the Grand Cross with Star and Sash of the Order of Merit of the Federal Republic of Germany in 1963. In 1964 he became President of the German Institute for International and Security Affairs, the German government's main think tank in international relations. He was the father of Brigadier General Hans Helmut Speidel and the father-in-law of European Commissioner and liberal politician Guido Brunner. A German Army military base, the General Dr Speidel Barracks in Bruchsal, was named in his honour in 1997.

== Early career ==
Speidel was born in Metzingen. He joined the German Army in 1914 at the outbreak of the First World War and was quickly promoted to second lieutenant. During the war he was a company commander at the Battle of the Somme and an adjutant. He stayed in the German Army during the interwar period and also studied history and economics at different universities. In 1926 he received his Ph.D. degree in history magna cum laude.

== Second World War ==
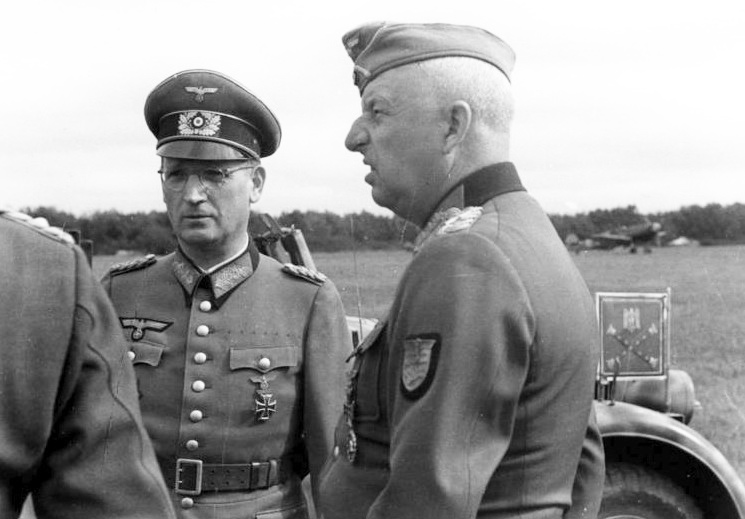
Speidel with Erich von Manstein August 1943

Speidel took part in the invasion of France of 1940 and in August became Chief of Staff of the military commander in France. During his time in France, Speidel was linked to the mass executions and deportations of Jewish and Communist hostages in reprisal for partisan activities by the French Resistance. Although the reprisals were never ordered by Speidel himself, but military governors Otto von Stülpnagel, and after von Stülpnagel resigned due to his reluctance to carry out the reprisals, his cousin, Carl-Heinrich von Stülpnagel, his involvement later drew controversy. Speidel would send reports on the reprisals to the Oberkommando der Wehrmacht in Berlin, and at one point attempted to justify the measures, claiming that they were aimed at the Jewish communists who were behind attacks on the Wehrmacht.

In 1942 Speidel was sent to the Eastern Front where he served as Chief of Staff of the 5th Army Corps, and as Chief of Staff of 8th Army in 1943, where he was promoted to general.

In April 1944, Speidel was appointed Chief of Staff to Field Marshal Erwin Rommel, the Commander-in-Chief of Army Group B, stationed on the French Atlantic coast. When Rommel was wounded, Speidel continued as Chief of Staff for the new commander of Army Group B, Field Marshal Günther von Kluge.

On 26 August 1944, Speidel answered the phone when Alfred Jodl, the OKW chief of staff, called Field Marshal Walter Model, commander in chief of the western front, with Hitler's order to start targeting Paris immediately with V1 and V2 rockets. Model was not in. Speidel did not pass on the order to his superior.

== 20 July Plot ==
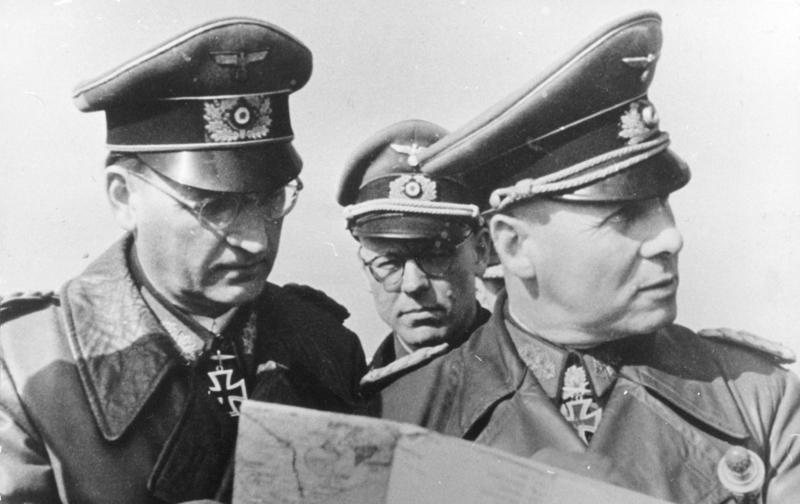
Speidel with Erwin Rommel, April 1944

Speidel, a professional soldier and nationalist conservative, agreed with those aspects of Hitler's policy that returned Germany to its perceived place as a world power, but disagreed with the Nazis' racial policies. He was involved in the 20 July Plot to kill Hitler and had been delegated by anti-Hitler forces to recruit Rommel for the conspiracy, which he had cautiously begun to do prior to Rommel's injury in a British strafing attack on 17 July 1944. Speidel managed to become Rommel's confidant, purely by chance: Lucie Rommel, after having an argument with the wife of Alfred Gause (Rommel's then Chief-of-Staff) about who had the more honourable place at a wedding, decided to not only evict the Gause couple out of her house but to order her husband to dismiss Alfred Gause as well. Rommel chose Speidel, a fellow Swabian, as his new Chief-of-Staff.

Following the assassination attempt, the Gestapo rounded up, tortured and executed some five thousand Germans, including many high-ranking officers. Speidel's involvement was suspected by the Gestapo, and he was arrested on 7 September 1944. Rommel, in his final letter to Hitler of 1 October 1944, appealed for Speidel's release, but received no answer. Speidel appeared before an Army court of honour. According to an affidavit left by Heinz Guderian and Heinrich Kirchheim, during interrogation he blurted out Rommel's name. Maurice Remy comments that Speidel's testimony did not truly betray Rommel, although Speidel probably blamed himself until his death for his revered Field Marshal's fate afterwards. Unknown to Speidel though, his statement offered nothing new or startling to the interrogators, who had already obtained from other co-conspirators the information that Rommel not only knew about but agreed with the assassination. Gerd von Rundstedt, Heinz Guderian and Wilhelm Keitel refused to expel him from the German Army. Thus he was not compelled to appear before Roland Freisler's People's Court, which would have been a death sentence. He was jailed for seven months by the Gestapo. As Allied forces approached the location where he was held, he slipped from his captors and went into hiding for not longer than three weeks until 29 April 1945, when French troops entered the area.

== Cold War ==
In 1950, Speidel was one of the authors of the Himmerod memorandum which addressed the issue of rearmament (Wiederbewaffnung) of the Federal Republic of Germany after World War II. As an important military adviser to the government of Konrad Adenauer, he was instrumental in the creation of the Bundeswehr, and later as a four-star general (the first to be awarded this rank by the Bundeswehr, together with Adolf Heusinger), he oversaw the smooth integration of the Bundeswehr into NATO.

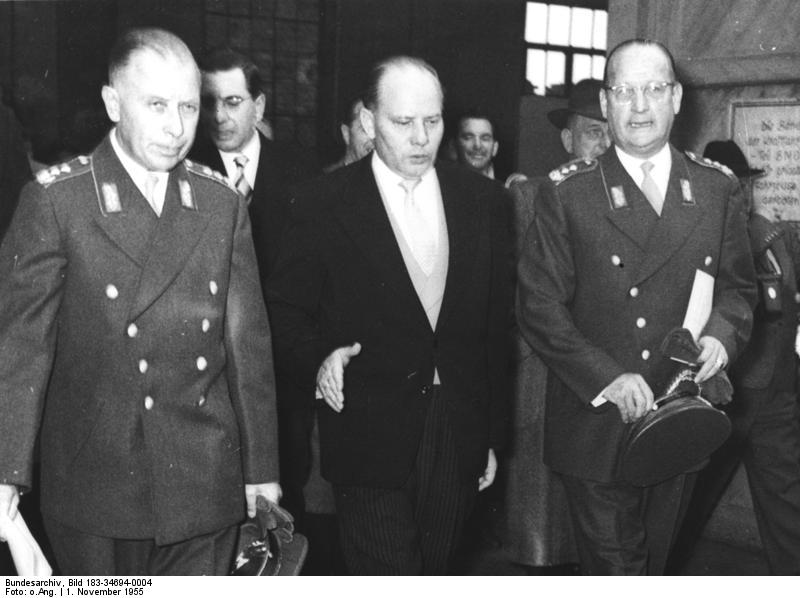
November 1955 (left to right): Adolf Heusinger, future Chief of Staff of the Bundeswehr; Theodor Blank, Minister of Defence, West Germany; and Speidel

According to an article in Der Spiegel, which cited documents released by the Bundesnachrichtendienst in 2014, Speidel may have been part of the Schnez-Truppe, a secret illegal army that veterans of the Wehrmacht and Waffen-SS established up from 1949 in Germany in order to repel an attack either by the Soviet Union or by Soviet-controlled East German police units.

After the war Speidel served for some time as professor of modern history at Tübingen and in 1950 published his book Invasion 1944: Rommel and the Normandy Campaign before being involved in both the development and creation of the new German Army (Bundeswehr) which he joined, reaching the NATO rank of full general. He was subsequently appointed Supreme Commander of the Allied NATO ground forces in Central Europe in April 1957, a command that he held until retirement in September 1963. His headquarters were at the Palace of Fontainebleau in Paris.

Visit by General Hans Speidel to Karlsruhe on the occasion of a US Army reception to mark the 10th anniversary of the Karlsruhe Department of Historical Research at US Headquarters in Europe.

In 1960, Speidel took legal action against Plato Films, the UK distributor of an East German film which portrayed him as having been privy to the assassinations of King Alexander I of Yugoslavia and French Foreign Minister Louis Barthou in 1934, as well as having betrayed Field Marshal Erwin Rommel to the Nazis after the 20 July Plot in 1944. He claimed damages for libel. The case went as far as a first hearing at the House of Lords after which the parties settled out of court with Plato and its directors expressing regret and withdrawing the film from circulation and Speidel agreeing not to press a claim for damages. See articles in Daily Worker, Daily Telegraph and Times, 30 June 1962

Hans Speidel died in 1984 at Bad Honnef, North Rhine-Westphalia, aged 87.

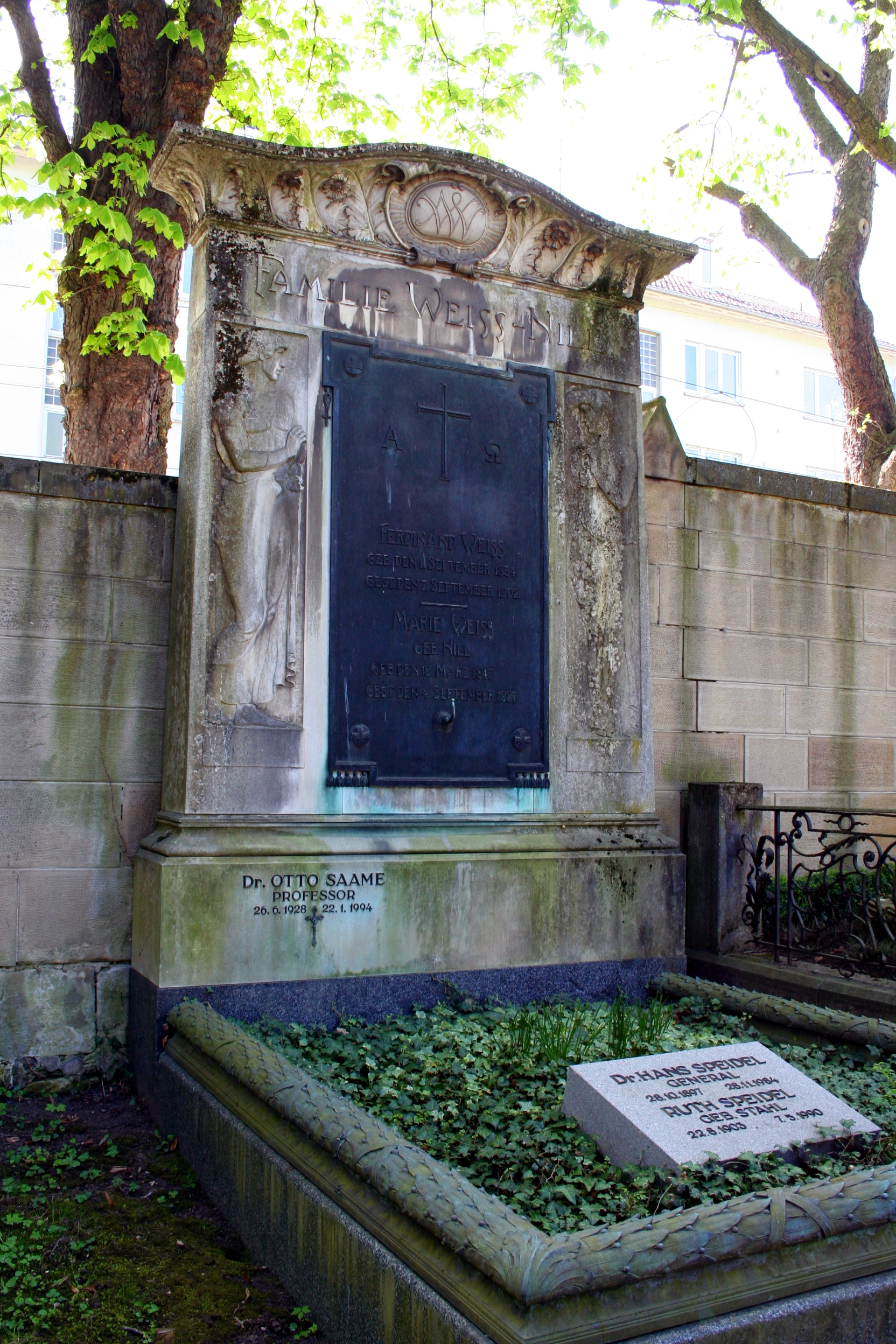
Speidel's grave at the Pragfriedhof in Stuttgart

== Honours ==
- Honorary citizen of Metzingen, 1972
- Grand Cross with Star and Sash of the Order of Merit of the Federal Republic of Germany, 1963
- German Cross in Gold on 8 October 1942 as Oberst im Generstab in the general staff V. Armeekorps
- Knight's Cross of the Iron Cross on 1 April 1944 as Generalleutnant and chief of the general staff of the 8. Armee
- Goldene Württembergische Militärverdienstmedaille, 1917
- Iron Cross, first and second class, 1914 (see photo)

== See also ==
- Assassination attempts on Adolf Hitler
