= 2nd Panzergrenadier Division =

Coordinates: 51.306673°N 9.446568°E

- 2nd Panzergrenadier Division insignia
- Active: 1 July 1956 – 31 March 1994
- Country: Federal Republic of Germany
- Role: Mechanized infantry
- Size: Division
- Part of: German III Corps
- Nicknames: Hessische Division, Die Zwote

The 2nd Panzergrenadier Division (2. Panzergrenadierdivision) was a West German mechanized infantry formation. It was part of the III Corps of the Bundeswehr, which also incorporated in 1985 the 5th Panzer Division and 12th Panzer Division. III Corps was part of NATO's Central Army Group (CENTAG), along with the Bundeswehr's II Corps and the American V and VII Corps. In the wake of military restructuring brought about by the end of the Cold War, the 2nd Panzergrenadier Division was disbanded in 1994.

The division was constituted as the 2nd Grenadier Division in Kassel on 1 July 1956 as part of the II Corps (then called "Army Staff II") of the Bundeswehr. At that time, it commanded the "A2" and "B2" battle-groups. In 1957, the division was subordinated to the German III Corps and one year later it received a third battle-group, "C2". The battle-groups later became the 6th Panzer, 5th Panzergrenadier, and 4th Panzergrenadier Brigades. As part of an army reorganization in 1959, the division was renamed the 2nd Panzergrenadier Division and division headquarters was quartered at Marburg.

In 1970, the division was renamed the 2nd Jäger (light infantry) Division. In 1974, the division headquarters was moved back to Kassel. The division once again became the 2nd Panzergrenadier Division in 1980. Following the end of the Cold War, the 2nd Panzergrenadier Division was disbanded in 1994.

== Commanders ==
Nr.	Name	Start of command	End of command
15	Wolfgang Estorf	1991	1994
14	Hans Grillmeier	1987	1991
13	Carl-Helmut Lichel	1984	1987
12	Manfred Fanslau	1981	1984
11	Werner Schäfer	1979	1981
10	Fritz von Westermann	1976	1979
9	Carl-Gero von Ilsemann	1971	1976
8	Rolf Juergens	1970	1971
7	Ernst Ferber	1967	1969
6	Werner Drews	1964	1967
5	Klaus Müller	1961	1964
4	Ottomar Hansen	1960	1961
3	Alfred Zerbel	1958	1960
2	Friedrich Foertsch	1957	1958
1	Otto Schaefer	1956	1957

== Literature ==
- Erinnerungsbuch 2. Panzergrenadierdivision, Herausgeber: 2. Panzergrenadierdivision (Major i. G. Dr. phil. Gert-Detlef Feddern), erschienen beim Verlag Moritz Diesterweg, Frankfurt am Main, 1962
- 2. Panzergrenadierdivision/Die "Zwote"/Eine Chronik der Geschichte der "Hessischen Division", 1. Auflage 1994, Herausgeber: Kameradschaft 2. Panzergrenadierdivision e. V.
