= Spiegel affair =

1962 political scandal in West Germany

The 10 October 1962 edition of Der Spiegel

The Spiegel affair of 1962 (German: Spiegel-Affäre) was a political scandal in West Germany. It stemmed from the publication of an article in Der Spiegel, West Germany's weekly political magazine, about the nation's defense forces. Several Spiegel staffers were detained on charges of treason, but were ultimately released without trial.

The scandal stemmed from a conflict between Franz Josef Strauss, federal minister of defense, and Rudolf Augstein, owner and editor-in-chief of Der Spiegel. The affair cost Strauss his office and, according to some commentators, put the post-war West German democracy to its first successful test of press freedom.

== Cause ==
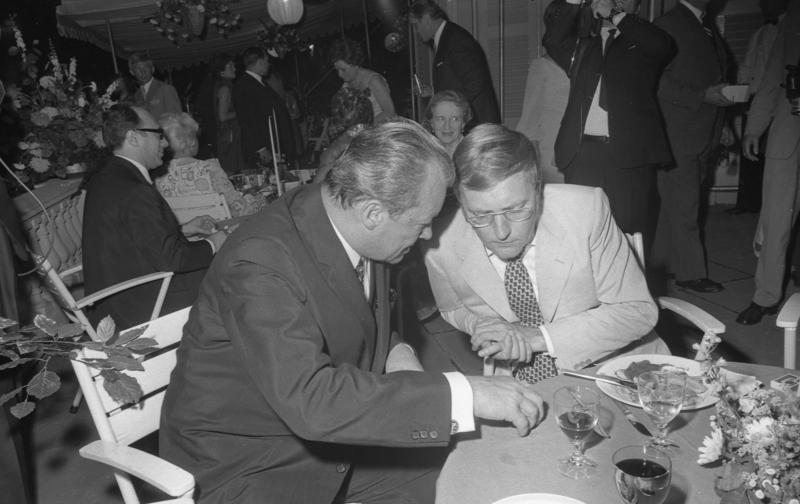
Rudolf Augstein (right) in 1970 with chancellor Willy Brandt

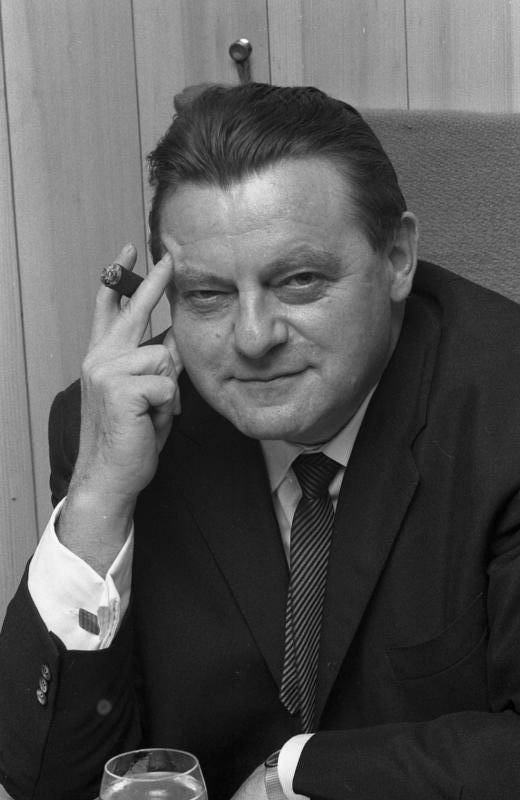
Strauss in 1966

Strauss and Augstein had clashed in 1961, when Der Spiegel raised accusations of bribery in favor of the FIBAG construction company, which had received a contract for building military facilities; however, a parliamentary enquiry found no evidence against Strauss.

The quarrel escalated when the 10 October 1962 issue of Der Spiegel presented an article by Conrad Ahlers, "Bedingt abwehrbereit" ("Conditionally Ready to Defend"), about a NATO exercise called "Fallex 62". The piece "included details about the performance of West Germany’s defense forces" and "a NATO commander’s assessment that found the West German forces to be only partially ready to defend the country."

The magazine was accused of treason (Landesverrat) "by publishing details that a hastily compiled Defense Ministry document claimed were state secrets". At 9 p.m. on 26 October, its offices in Hamburg, as well as the homes of several journalists, were raided and searched by 36 policemen, who confiscated thousands of documents. Augstein and editors-in-chief Claus Jacobi and Johannes Engel were arrested. The author of the article, Ahlers, who was vacationing in Spain, was arrested in his hotel during the night. Augstein was in custody for 103 days. The offices remained under police occupation for four weeks, while the magazine continued to appear each week, produced not without some difficulty, elsewhere.

Federal Chancellor Konrad Adenauer was informed of Strauss' actions. However, Wolfgang Stammberger, the Minister of Justice, belonging to the smaller coalition partner FDP, was deliberately left out of all decisions. News of the arrests caused riots and protests throughout West Germany. Strauss initially denied all involvement, even before the Bundestag; Adenauer, in another speech, complained about an "abyss of treason" ("Abgrund von Landesverrat").

Strauss was finally forced to admit that he had phoned the military attaché of the West German embassy to Spain in Madrid and urged the attaché to have Ahlers arrested. This was clearly illegal – as Minister of the Interior Hermann Höcherl paraphrased, "etwas außerhalb der Legalität" ("somewhat outside of legality"). Since Strauss had lied to the parliament, on 19 November the five FDP ministers of the cabinet resigned, demanding that Strauss be fired. This put Adenauer himself at risk. He found himself publicly accused of backing the suppression of a critical press with the resources of the state.

== Conclusion ==
On 26 November, the police ended their occupation of the Der Spiegel offices, while Augstein, Ahlers and three others remained under arrest – Augstein until 7 February 1963. In December 1962, Adenauer formed a new coalition with the Free Democratic Party but Strauss and Stammberger were left out of power.

On 13 May 1965, the Bundesgerichtshof (highest German court of appeals) refused to commence trial proceedings against Augstein and Ahlers, ruling that during the affair Strauss had exceeded his competencies and committed Freiheitsberaubung (deprivation of personal freedom); however, because of his belief of acting lawfully ("Verbotsirrtum"), he was exempt from punishment. The case also came before the Federal Constitutional Court of Germany, which issued a groundbreaking ruling in August 1966 that laid down the basics of the freedom of the press for decades to come.

== Aftermath ==
The scandal temporarily halted Strauss' political career and was remembered by many when Strauss ran for Chancellor in 1980, clearly losing against his SPD opponent (and incumbent) Helmut Schmidt. However, it is mostly remembered for altering the political culture of post-war West Germany and – with the first mass demonstrations and public protests – being a turning point from the old Obrigkeitsstaat (authoritarian state) to a modern democracy. The British historian Frederick Taylor argued that the Federal Republic under Adenauer retained many of the characteristics of the authoritarian "deep state" that existed under the Weimar Republic, and that the Spiegel affair marked an important turning point in German values as ordinary people rejected the old authoritarian outlook in favour of the more democratic values that came to be seen as the bedrock of the Federal Republic.

Augstein became one of International Press Institute's 50 Hero of World Press Freedom laureates in 2000 for his role in the Spiegel scandal. The scandal was the closure of a reactionary period and the parochial culture in West Germany.

== Movie adaptation ==
The Spiegel affair was adapted into a German television film, Public Enemies, which was broadcast in May 2014 on Arte and ARD. The film was criticized by Rudolf Augstein's daughter, Franziska Augstein for containing many historical inaccuracies, in particular for inappropriately focusing on personal conflicts between Strauss and Augstein to the detriment of covering the actual political and judicial conflict in the society.

== See also ==
- Fibag scandal
- For the 2018 journalistic scandal sometimes referred to as Spiegelgate, see Claas Relotius
