= Jürgen Brandt =

Bundeswehr general (1922–2003)

General Jürgen Brandt
- Born: 19 October 1922; Kiel, Schleswig-Holstein, Weimar Republic
- Died: 26 June 2003 (aged 80); Meckenheim, North Rhine-Westphalia, Germany
- Military career
- Allegiance: Nazi Germany; West Germany
- Branch: Wehrmacht; Bundeswehr
- Service years: 1942–1945; 1957–1983
- Rank: Lieutenant General
- Commands: Inspector General of the Bundeswehr (1978–1983); 10th Panzer Division (Bundeswehr) (1974–1976)
- Conflicts: World War II

Jürgen Brandt (19 October 1922 – 26 July 2003) was a German General who served as Inspector General of the Bundeswehr from 1978 until 1983.

== Life and military career ==
Brandt's father was an upholsterer and decorator, later a municipal employee. At the age of 18, starting on January 5, 1941, Brandt first completed his compulsory service in the Reich Labour Service and subsequently spent twelve months as an instructor in Kampen, Lannion (France), and Laupheim. On April 15, 1942, he joined the Wehrmacht and completed recruit training with Grenadier Replacement Battalion 46 in Neumünster. From January to May 1943, he attended the reserve officer candidate course with Infantry Replacement Battalion 6 in Lübeck. From June 1943, he served with the 4th Company of Infantry Regiment 46 on the front lines in Staraya Russa, Ostrov, and Courland. On October 10, 1943, he was transferred from reserve officer candidate to active duty as an officer cadet sergeant. From November 1943 to February 1944, he completed the officer cadet course at the Infantry School on the Thorn training area, and from March 1944, the Senior Ensign cadet course at the Infantry School in Milovice. In the final days of the war, he served as a platoon leader and commander of a motor gunboat in the (amphibious) 1st Coastal Rifle Division Brandenburg on Rhodes and was taken Prisoner of war by the British on May 9, 1945, from which he was released on June 13, 1947.

On August 1, 1947, he became a city employee in the press office of his birthplace, Kiel, working as the second press spokesman. From February 1949, he was the editor of the magazine "Der Bauhandwerker" (The Construction Worker).

From October 1950, he worked for the office of Gerhard von Schwerin. After the Blank Office was dissolved at the end of 1950, Brandt worked for two and a half years at the Federal Office for the Protection of the Constitution. In 1953, he transferred to the Blank Office, the predecessor of the Federal Ministry of Defense. There, in 1955, he was head of section II 1/4 (5) “Security Planning” within the main section II 1/4 “Documentation and Military Security ”, which was headed by Achim Oster.

With the establishment of the Bundeswehr, Brandt also had the opportunity to join the new armed forces. He was commissioned as a captain on April 4, 1957, and became deputy company commander of the 3rd Company of Panzerlehrbataillon 92 (Armored Training Battalion 92) in Munster . From April 1958, he served as S3 officer and, from October, as company commander of the 3rd Company of that battalion. From June 1959 to March 1961, he was a regulations officer in the ATP (Army Technical Personnel) staff at the Combat Troops School II in Munster. After completing his officer training in the General Staff Service at the 4th Army General Staff Course from 1961 to 1963 at the Bundeswehr Command and Staff College in Hamburg, during which he was promoted to major on May 1, 1962, he became G3 staff officer of Panzergrenadierbrigade 32 (Armored Infantry Brigade 32) in Schwanewede in October 1963. In October 1966, he was assigned as a personal general staff officer to the Allied Joint Force Command Brunssum, then General (Germany) Johann von Kielmansegg Kielmansegg, in Fontainebleau, France. Following the relocation of headquarters to Brunssum, Netherlands, he was promoted to lieutenant Colonel upon taking up his post. In October 1970, he became a Colonel and head of section III 1 (Military Policy Foundations) in the Armed Forces Staff (Fü S) at the Federal Ministry of Defense in Bonn. In April 1973, he was promoted to brigadier General and deputy head of the staff section Fü S III (Military Policy, Leadership). In July 1974, he became commander of the 10th Panzer Division, then stationed in Sigmaringen, where he was promoted to major General in October 1974. In November 1975, he returned to the Federal Ministry of Defense as head of the staff section Fü S III. In April 1978, he became the German Military Representative to the NATO Military Committee in Brussels and was appointed Lieutenant General, but was recalled to Bonn after only a few months, where on December 12, 1978, he was appointed Inspector General and promoted to General, succeeding General Harald Wust. Brandt retired on March 31, 1983.

Military offices
Preceded by General Harald Wust	Inspector General of the Bundeswehr; 12 December 1978 – 31 March 1983	Succeeded by General Wolfgang Altenburg
Preceded by Generalmajor Rudolf Reichenberger	Commander of 10th Panzer Division (Bundeswehr); 24 June 1974 – 13 January 1976	Succeeded by Generalmajor Günter Kießling
