= Thomas de Maizière =

German politician (born 1954)

Thomas de Maizière Bundesminister a. D.
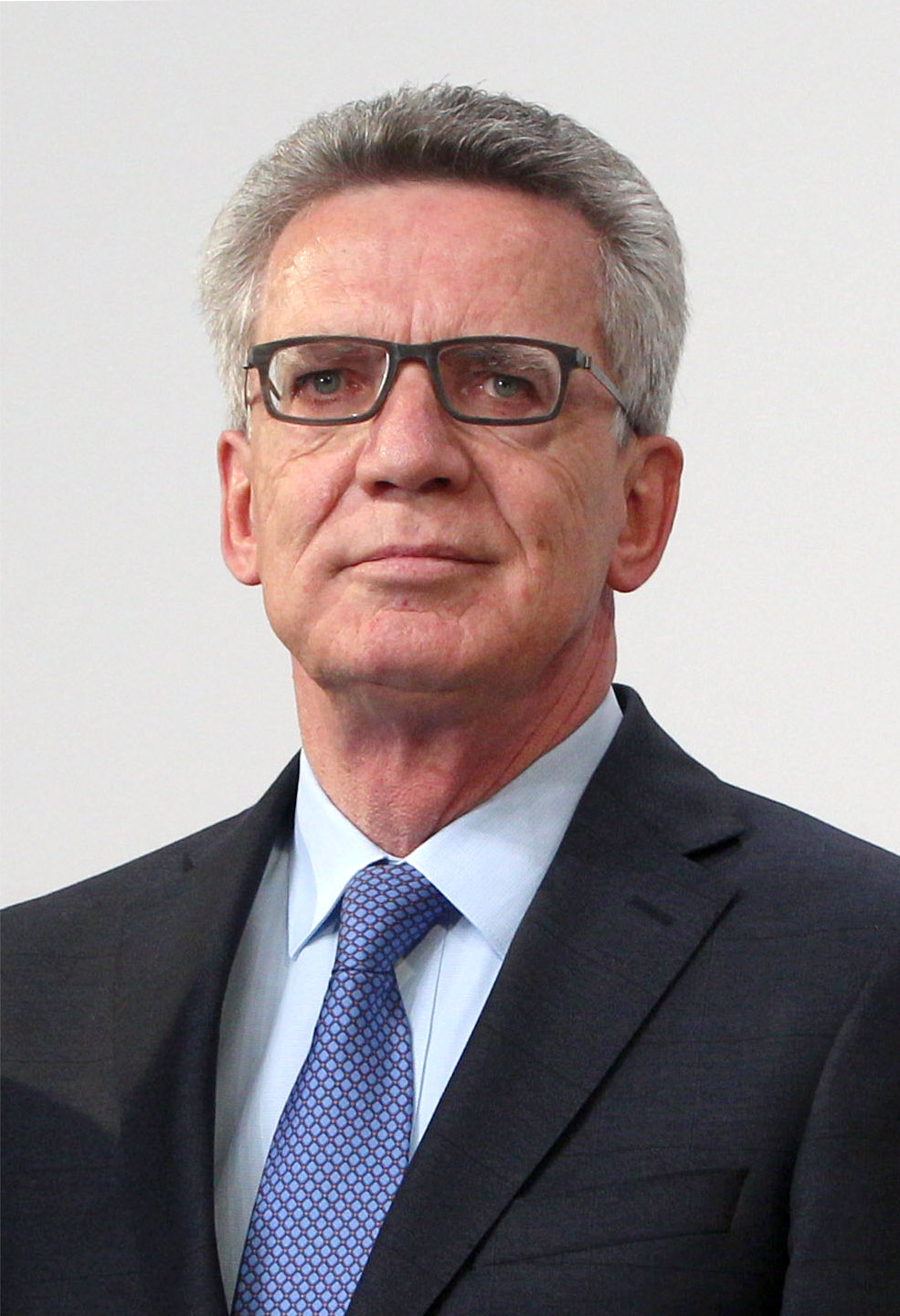
- De Maizière in 2017

Minister of the Interior
- In office 17 December 2013 – 14 March 2018
- Chancellor: Angela Merkel
- Preceded by: Hans-Peter Friedrich
- Succeeded by: Horst Seehofer
- In office 28 October 2009 – 3 March 2011
- Chancellor: Angela Merkel
- Preceded by: Wolfgang Schäuble
- Succeeded by: Hans-Peter Friedrich

Minister of Defence
- In office 3 March 2011 – 17 December 2013
- Chancellor: Angela Merkel
- Preceded by: Karl-Theodor zu Guttenberg
- Succeeded by: Ursula von der Leyen

Head of the Chancellery Minister for Special Affairs
- In office 22 November 2005 – 27 October 2009
- Chancellor: Angela Merkel
- Preceded by: Frank-Walter Steinmeier (as Secretary of State)
- Succeeded by: Ronald Pofalla

Member of the Bundestag for Meißen
- In office 27 October 2009 – 26 October 2021
- Preceded by: Constituency established
- Succeeded by: Barbara Lenk
State political posts
Member of the Landtag of Saxony for Bautzen 1
In office 19 October 2004 – 21 November 2005
Preceded by	Andreas Hahn
Succeeded by	Karl Mannsfeld
State Minister for the Interior of Saxony
In office 11 November 2004 – 22 November 2005
Minister-President	Georg Milbradt
Preceded by	Horst Rasch
Succeeded by	Albrecht Buttolo
State Minister of Justice of Saxony
In office 2 May 2002 – 11 November 2004
Minister-President	Georg Milbradt
Preceded by	Manfred Kolbe
Succeeded by	Geert Mackenroth
State Minister of Finances of Saxony
In office 31 January 2001 – 2 May 2002
Minister-President	Kurt Biedenkopf
Preceded by	Georg Milbradt
Succeeded by	Horst Metz
State Minister and Chief of the State Chancellery of Saxony
In office 27 October 1999 – 31 January 2001
Minister-President	Kurt Biedenkopf
Preceded by	Günter Meyer
Succeeded by	Georg Brüggen
State Secretary and Chief of the State Chancellery of Mecklenburg-Vorpommern
In office 8 December 1994 – 2 November 1998
Minister-President	Berndt Seite
Preceded by	Gabriele Wurzel
Succeeded by	Otto Ebnet

Personal details
- Born: Karl Ernst Thomas de Maizière; 21 January 1954 (age 72) Bonn, West Germany
- Party: Christian Democratic Union
- Spouse: Martina de Maizière
- Children: 3
- Parent: Ulrich de Maizière (father)
- Relatives: Lothar de Maizière (cousin)

Military service
- Allegiance: West Germany
- Branch/service: Bundeswehr
- Years of service: 1972–1974
- Rank: Oberleutnant
- Unit: Army (Heer) / Panzerbrigade 34

Karl Ernst Thomas de Maizière (German pronunciation: [də mɛˈzi̯ɛːɐ̯]; born 21 January 1954) is a German politician of the Christian Democratic Union (CDU) who served as Federal Minister of the Interior from 2009 to 2011 and 2013 to 2018, as well as Federal Minister of Defence from 2011 to 2013. He previously served as Head of the Chancellery and Federal Minister for Special Affairs in the First Merkel cabinet from 2005 to 2009. Since 2009, he has been a member of the Bundestag for Meißen.

Along with Ursula von der Leyen and Wolfgang Schäuble, De Maizière was one of only three ministers to have continuously served in Chancellor Angela Merkel's cabinets from 2005 until 2018. Together with von der Leyen, he was widely looked on as a possible future successor to Merkel. Before his appointment to the federal cabinet, he served as a minister in the state government of Saxony, including as chief of staff to the Minister-President, State Minister of Finance and State Minister of Justice.

== Early life and education ==
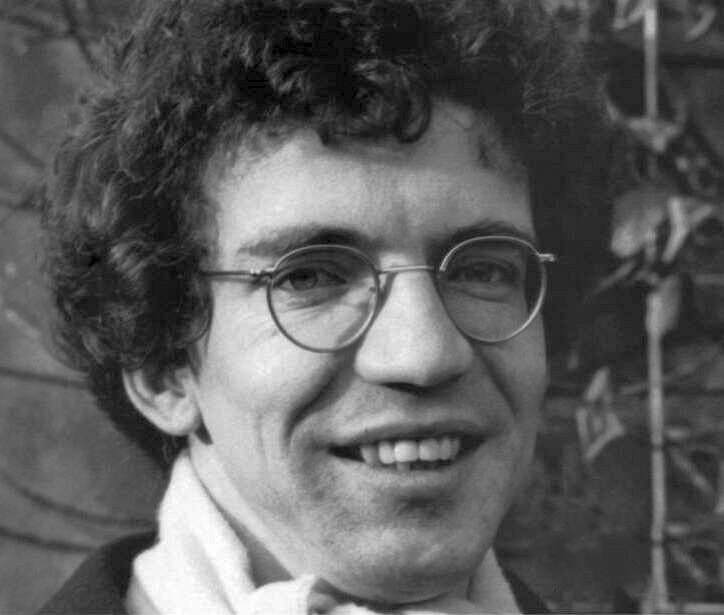
Thomas de Maizière, c. 1970s

Maizière was born in Bonn to the later Inspector general of the Bundeswehr, Ulrich de Maizière. He graduated at the Aloisiuskolleg in Bonn and studied law and history at the Westfälische Wilhelms-Universität in Münster and the University of Freiburg. He passed his first state examination in law in 1979 and his second 1982, earning his Doctor of law (Dr. jur.) in 1986.

He belongs to a noble family originally from Maizières-lès-Metz who, as Huguenots, had fled France for asylum in Prussia in the late 17th century. The Maizière family still attended French-language schools and Huguenot churches in Berlin until the beginning of the 20th century. His cousin Lothar de Maizière is also a CDU politician and was the last, and only democratically elected, Premier of the German Democratic Republic, who later served as Federal Minister of Special Affairs in the government of Helmut Kohl until his resignation following the discovery of his affiliation with the GDR secret service.

== Political career ==
=== Early career in state politics ===
Maizière worked for the governing mayor (prime minister) of West Berlin (Baron Richard von Weizsäcker and Eberhard Diepgen), before becoming a member of the West German team in the negotiations on German reunification. After 1990 he worked with re-establishing democratic structures in states that were part of the former German Democratic Republic. He became secretary of state at the ministry of culture of the state of Mecklenburg-Vorpommern in November 1990. From December 1994 to 1998 he was chief of staff of the Chancellery of Mecklenburg-Vorpommern.

He served as the chief of the Saxon Chancellery from 1999 to 2001, with the rank of cabinet minister. As chief of staff to Kurt Biedenkopf, he helped negotiate the special Solidarity Pact designed to finance the reconstruction of the former East Germany. From 2001 to 2002 he served as the minister of finance of Saxony, from 2002 to 2004 minister of justice, and from 2004 to 2005 as minister of the interior.

=== Chief of Staff at the Federal Chancellery (2005–2009) ===
On 17 October 2005, Maizière was nominated as a member of the Federal Government as chief of the Chancellor's office and as federal minister for special affairs in the first Merkel cabinet. He took office on 22 November 2005, after Merkel's election as Chancellor by the Bundestag. In his capacity as chief of staff of the chancellery, he also functioned as deputy president of the German Institute for International and Security Affairs (Stiftung Wissenschaft und Politik).

Between 2007 and 2009, Maizière was one of 32 members of the Second Commission on the modernization of the federal state, which was established to reform the division of powers between federal and state authorities in Germany.

=== Federal Minister of the Interior (2009–2011) ===
He was elected in Meißen. In the negotiations to form a coalition government following the 2009 federal elections, Maizière led the CDU/CSU delegation in the working group on taxes, national budget, and financial policy; with Hermann Otto Solms of the FDP as joint chairman. Following the formation of the Second Merkel cabinet, he took office as Federal Minister of the Interior.

As Interior Minister, Maizière long played down security worries, but he abruptly changed course late in 2010, giving warnings that there were serious indications of terror attacks being prepared in Europe and the United States. In July 2010, he outlawed the Internationale Humanitäre Hilfsorganisation (IHH), a charity registered in Frankfurt, because of its alleged links to the militant Palestinian organization Hamas, arguing that "the IHH has, under the cover of humanitarian aid, supported Gaza Strip-based so-called social associations which are attributable to Hamas, for a long period of time and to a considerable financial extent." That same month, Maizière announced that Germany would take over and release two prisoners of the Guantanamo Bay detention camp.

In October 2010, Maizière and Transport Minister Peter Ramsauer banned arrivals of all air cargo from Yemen, after the German authorities had been tipped off by a foreign intelligence service that there were explosives inside a U.S.-bound parcel trans-shipped at Cologne Bonn Airport.

=== Minister of Defence (2011–2013) ===
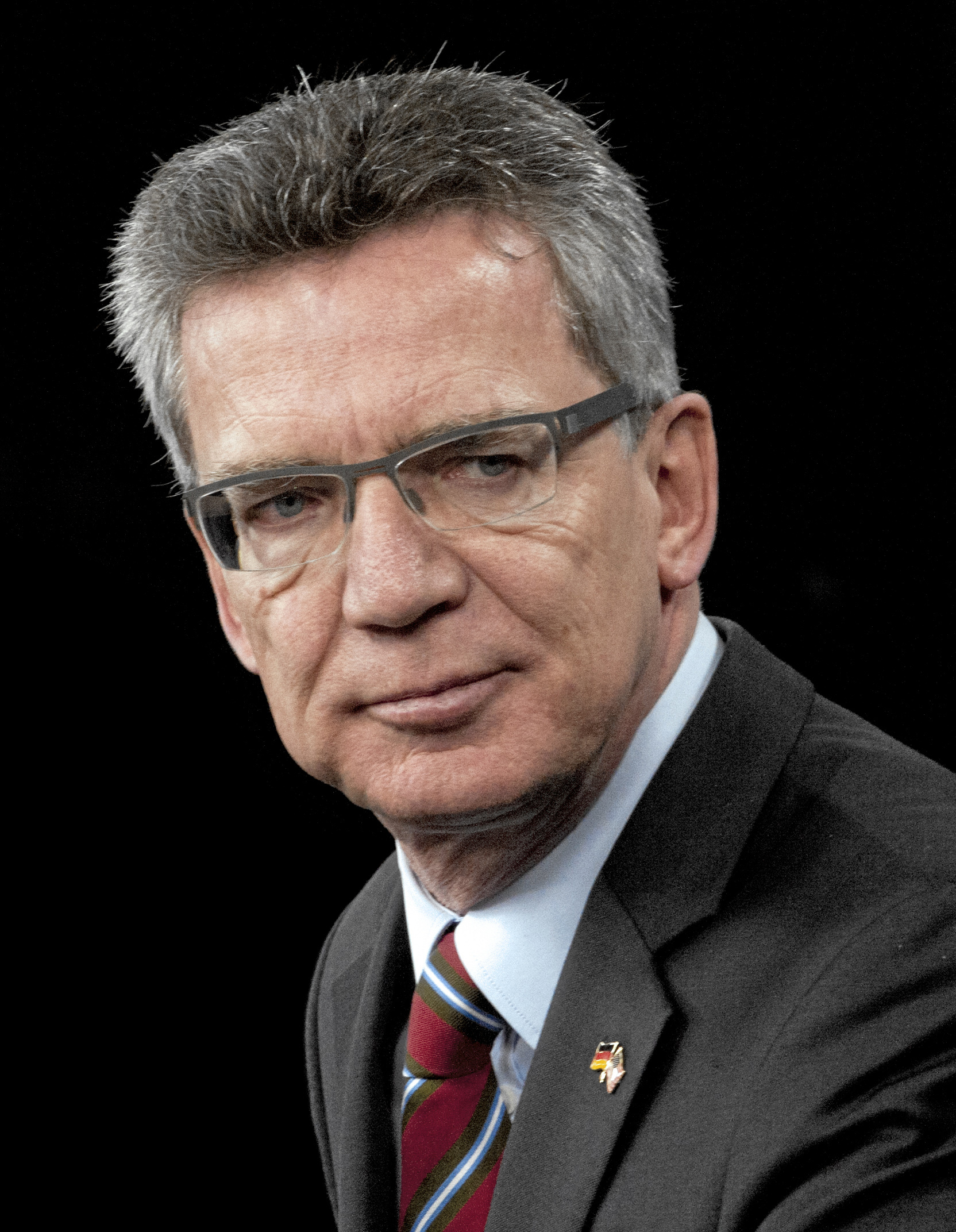
De Maizière as Minister of Defence at a news conference in 2012

On 2 March 2011, Merkel announced that Maizière was to take over from Karl-Theodor zu Guttenberg, the federal defence minister who had resigned from office the previous day. On 3 March, he was formally appointed to this post. He held the defence ministry portfolio until 17 December 2013.

Signaling one of the biggest shake-ups in decades for the German military, in 2011 Maizière unveiled plans to reduce troop numbers, cut bureaucracy, and eliminate duplication inside the Federal Ministry of Defence. Under these proposals, the army was to be turned into a wholly professional force.

On the occasion of the sixtieth anniversary of the diplomatic relations between German and India, Maizière participated in the first joint cabinet meeting of the two countries' governments in Delhi in May 2011. On 7 June 2011, he attended the state dinner hosted by President Barack Obama in honor of Chancellor Angela Merkel at the White House.

Speaking to the German newspaper Frankfurter Allgemeine Zeitung in February 2012, Maizière said that an Israel Defense Forces strike on Iran's nuclear facilities was "highly unlikely" to succeed, and noted that such a strike would cause "obvious political damage." During a meeting in Berlin in March 2012, he warned Israel's Defense Minister Ehud Barak against an attack on Iran, joining other Western countries which were applying heavy international pressure on Israel to prevent it from attacking Iran's nuclear facilities.

In 2012, Maizière told a gathering of army reservists that he considered the U.S. strategy of using drones for targeted killings a "strategic mistake". According to the online news edition of the German public television broadcaster ARD, Maizière had said he thought it was unwise to have U.S. commanders direct such attacks from their bases in the United States.

=== Second appointment as Federal Minister of the Interior (2013–2018) ===
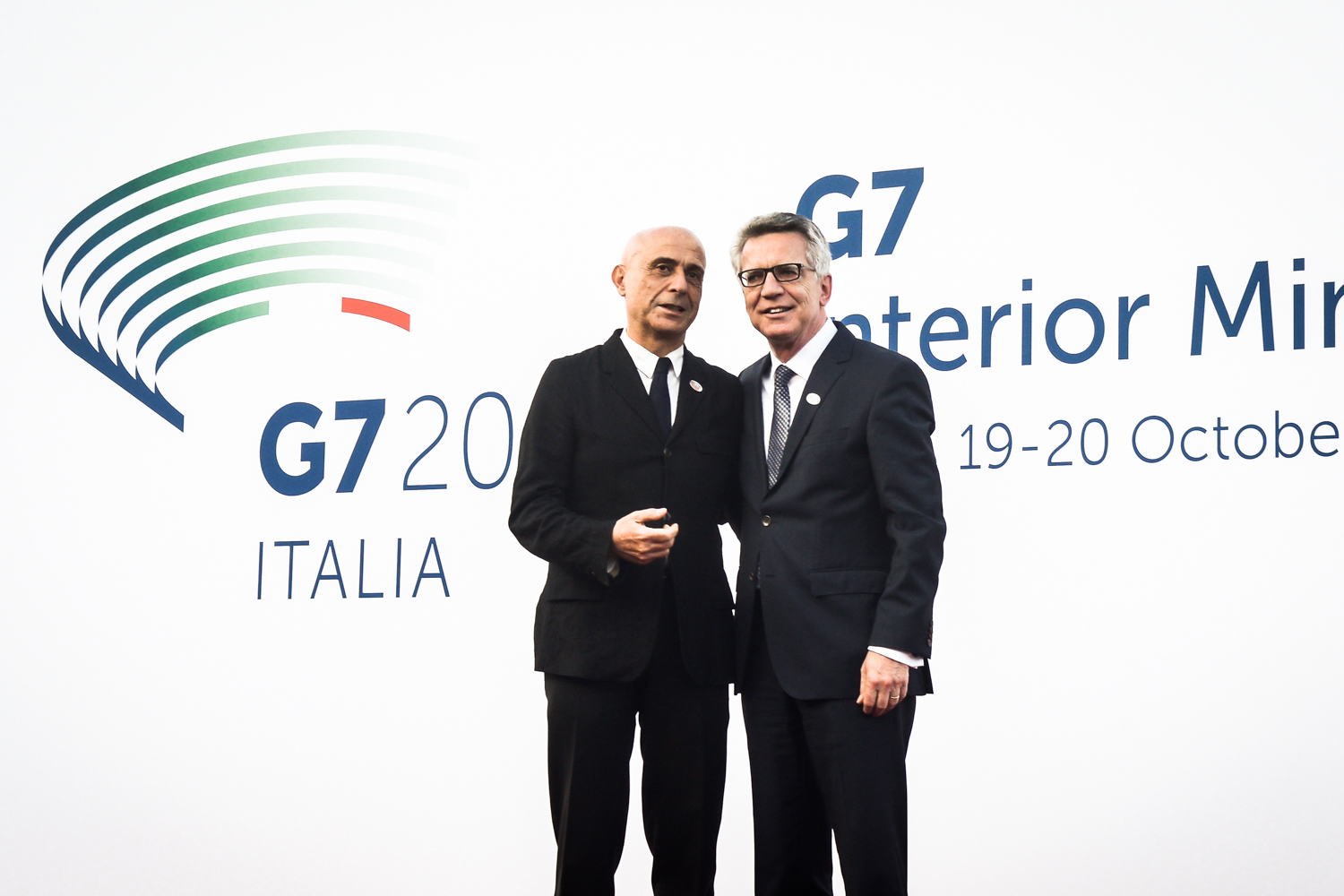
Thomas de Maizière with his Italian counterpart Marco Minniti, 2017

In the negotiations to form a government following the 2013 federal elections, Maizière led the CDU/CSU members in the working group on foreign affairs, defense, and development cooperation; his co-chair from the SPD was Frank-Walter Steinmeier. On 17 December 2013, he was appointed as Federal Minister of the Interior for a second time. In addition, he co-chairs the EPP Justice and Home Affairs Ministers Meeting, alongside Esteban González Pons.

On 23 February 2014, Bild am Sonntag reported that Maizière and other members of the government, as well as leading figures in business, were under NSA surveillance. The newspaper report, quoting an unnamed NSA official, said the U.S. was particularly interested in the interior minister "because he is a close aide of Merkel, who seeks his advice on many issues and was rumored to be promoting his candidacy for the post of NATO secretary-general." From the beginning of 2015, the left-wing opposition and media commentators have repeatedly criticized de Maizière over his record as chief of staff in 2005–09, and over what he knew about Germany's Federal Intelligence Service (BND) helping U.S. agencies to spy on European firms such as the defence manufacturer Airbus.

In late 2014, Maizière proposed a law according to which the government would have the power to withdraw the identity cards of potential foreign fighters and replace them with another form of identification; this was meant to allow government agencies to prevent Germans from leaving the country to join groups such as Islamic State in Iraq and Syria. In May 2015, he banned Yuruyus, a leftist-terrorist newspaper published by the Turkish extremist group DHKP-C, and had his ministry order raids across the country in connection with this ban.

By late 2015, amid the European migrant crisis, de Maizière urged that Europe should set a limit on the number of refugees it takes in and seek out those most clearly entitled to protection. His critics say he failed to fight for more staff and budget for the Federal Office for Migration and Refugees (BAMF), which falls under his ministry, despite years of warnings from German states that the agency was being overwhelmed with asylum applications. In an effort to better detect the identities of migrants arriving from Syria, Afghanistan and other trouble spots, de Maizière later spearheaded the introduction of an identity card for refugees.

In 2016, Maizière banned the neo-Nazi group "White Wolves Terror Crew" (WWT) following raids on 15 properties across the country as worries were growing about a rise in right-wing sentiment after the influx of more than a million migrants the previous year.

In January 2016, Maizière participated in the first joint cabinet meeting of the governments of Germany and Turkey in Berlin.

=== Later career ===
After leaving government in 2018, Maizère served on the Committee on Finance. In addition to his work in parliament, he taught constitutional law at the University of Leipzig.

Ahead of the Christian Democrats' leadership election in 2018, de Maizière publicly endorsed Annegret Kramp-Karrenbauer to succeed Angela Merkel as the party's chair.

Since 2019, de Maizière has been serving as chairman of the Deutsche Telekom Foundation. Also in 2019, he was appointed by the Federal Ministry of the Interior, Building and Community to serve on the committee that oversaw the preparations for the 30th anniversary of German reunification.

In 2020, de Maizière was appointed by NATO Secretary General Jens Stoltenberg to co-chair (alongside A. Wess Mitchell) a group of experts to support his work in a reflection process to further strengthen NATO's political dimension.

In May 2020, de Maizière announced that he would not stand in the 2021 federal elections but instead resign from active politics by the end of the parliamentary term.

== Life after politics ==
In 2023, de Maizière and Heide Pfarr served as unpaid arbitrators for negotiations between German railway operator Deutsche Bahn and the Railway and Transport Union (EVG).

== Other activities ==
- German Evangelical Church Assembly, Member of the Presidium
- Memorial to the Murdered Jews of Europe, Member of the Board of Trustees
- Moritzburg Festival, Member of the Board of Trustees
- National Paralympic Committee Germany, Member of the Board of Trustees
- Safety in Ski Sport Foundation (SIS), Member of the Board of Trustees
- ZEIT-Stiftung, Member of the Board of Trustees (since 2018)
- German Forum for Crime Prevention (DFK), Ex-Officio Member of the Board of Trustees (2013–2018)

== Recognition ==
- 2006 – Knight Grand Cross of the Order of Merit of the Italian Republic
- 2007 – Royal Norwegian Order of Merit
- 2009 – Grand Cross of the Ordem do Mérito
- 2009 – Order of Merit of the Federal Republic of Germany

== Personal life ==
Maizière is married to Martina de Maizière, with whom he has three children. He is a Protestant.

In April 2023, de Maizière was one of the 22 guests at the ceremony in which Angela Merkel was decorated with the Grand Cross of the Order of Merit for special achievement by President Frank-Walter Steinmeier at Schloss Bellevue in Berlin.

== Publications ==
- "Datenschutz ist kein Selbstzweck". Der Tagesspiegel. 16 February 2017.
- "Leitlinien für einen starken Staat in schwierigen Zeiten". Frankfurter Allgemeine Zeitung. 3 January 2017.
- "Ein Patriot hasst nicht!". Bild. 20 October 2015.
- "Das Netz – Raum der Chancen und der Freiheit". Frankfurter Allgemeine Zeitung (in German). 17 August 2014.
- "Wie Deutschland zusammenwachsen kann". Frankfurter Allgemeine Zeitung (in German). 13 August 2010.
- "Den Teufelskreis durchbrechen". Frankfurter Allgemeine Zeitung (in German). 22 April 2009.

Political offices
Preceded by Frank-Walter Steinmeier	Chief of the Chancellery; 2005–2009	Succeeded by Ronald Pofalla
Vacant Title last held by Bodo Hombach	Minister for Special Affairs; 2005–2009	Succeeded by Ronald Pofalla
Preceded by Wolfgang Schäuble	Minister of the Interior; 2009–2011	Succeeded by Hans-Peter Friedrich
Preceded by Karl-Theodor zu Guttenberg	Minister of Defence; 2011–2013	Succeeded by Ursula von der Leyen
Preceded by Hans-Peter Friedrich	Minister of the Interior; 2013–2018	Succeeded by Horst Seehofer
