= Wolfgang Altenburg =

German general (1928–2023)

General Wolfgang Altenburg
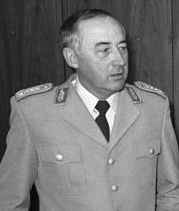
- Heusinger, 1983

Chairman of the NATO Military Committee
- In office 30 September 1986 – 5 September 1989
- Preceded by: Cor de Jager
- Succeeded by: Vigleik Eide

Inspector General of the Bundeswehr
- In office 1 April 1983 – 30 September 1986
- Chancellor: Helmut Kohl
- Preceded by: Jürgen Brandt
- Succeeded by: Dieter Wellershoff

Personal details
- Born: Adolf Bruno Heinrich Ernst Heusinger; 24 June 1928 Schneidemühl, Posen–West Prussia, Prussia, Weimar Republic (today Piła, Poland)
- Died: 25 January 2023 (aged 94) Travemünde, Schleswig-Holstein, Germany
- Spouse: Ursula "Ulla" Schölzel (m. 1951)
- Children: 3
- Awards: Grand Cross with Star and Sash of the Order of Merit of the Federal Republic of Germany; Commander of the Legion of Merit (US); Knight Grand Cross of the Order of Merit of the Italian Republic (Italy)

Military service
- Allegiance: Nazi Germany; West Germany
- Branch/service: German Army; Bundeswehr
- Years of service: 1944–1945; 1956–1989
- Rank: General
- Commands: III Corps (Bundeswehr) (1968–1972)
- Battles/wars: World War II

Wolfgang Altenburg (24 June 1928 – 25 January 2023) was a German general. He served as Inspector General of the German armed forces, the Bundeswehr, from 1983 to 1986, and as Chairman of the NATO Military Committee from 1986 to 1989.

== Biography ==
Altenburg was born in Schneidemühl, Posen–West Prussia (today Piła, Poland) and was conscripted as a Marinehelfer (Navy aide) in 1944 serving at Heligoland. After the end of World War II he completed a professional training in hotel business and volunteered for the Bundeswehr in 1956 at the Artillerytroops.

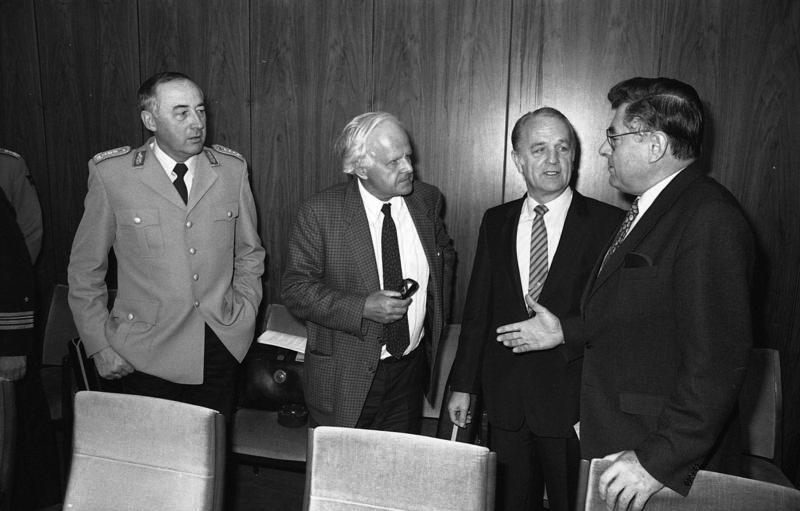
Altenburg talking to members of the Bundestag, 1983.

He transferred to Bremen-Grohn as Platoon Leader in Artillery regiment 3, 1962 becoming Battery Commander of a (nuclear) Honest John-Battery in Rocket artillery battalion 32 in Dörverden. Altenburg passed his general staff training at the Bundeswehr Command and Staff College from 1962 to 1964, was G1-Personal Staff Officer in 6. Panzer grenadier division, G3-General staff officer in the Panzerbrigade 18 and Commanding Officer of Feld artillery battalion 61 in Albersdorf. 1970–71 he was Public Affairs Officer and Personal Assistant of the Chief of Staff German Army (Inspekteur des Heeres), General lieutenant Albert Schnez. He became the Deputy Director of Nuclear Policy Section at SHAPE in October 1971, when NATO defined the 1969 established "Provisional Political Guidelines for the Tactical Defensive Use of Nuclear Weapons by NATO (PPG's)".

He returned to the German Ministry of Defense in 1973 as an Oberst and Branch Chief Military Policy Affäirs, commanded in 1975–76 the Panzer grenadier brigade 7 (Hamburg). In April 1978 Altenburg became the Director of the Executive Staff of the Federal Forces and in 1979 the German Representative at the Chairman of the NATO Military Committee in Brussels. In 1981 Altenburg took over the command of the III. Korps at Koblenz and became the Chief of staff of the Federal Forces (Generalinspekteur der Bundeswehr) in 1983, a position he held until 1986. On 1 October 1986, Altenburg became the Chairman of the NATO Military Committee himself. He retired in 1989 and served as chair at several companies. He died on 25 January 2023, at the age of 94.

Military offices
Preceded by Cor de Jager	Chairman of the NATO Military Committee; 30 September 1986 – 5 September 1989	Succeeded by Vigleik Eide
Preceded by General Jürgen Brandt	Inspector General of the Bundeswehr; 1 April 1983 – 30 September 1986	Succeeded by Admiral Dieter Wellershoff
Preceded by Generalleutnant Paul-Georg Kleffel	Commanding General, III Corps (Bundeswehr); 1 October 1968 – 30 September 1972	Succeeded by Generalleutnant Hans-Joachim Mack
