= Harald Kujat =

German general

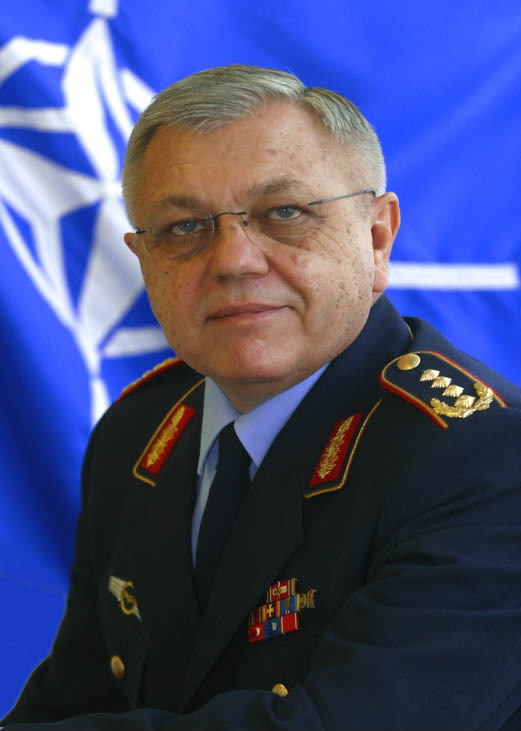
- Official portrait, 2003
- Born: 1 March 1942 (age 84); Mielke, Reichsgau Wartheland, German Reich (modern-day Ninino, Poland)
- Military career
- Allegiance: West Germany (to 1990); Germany
- Branch: German Air Force
- Service years: 1959–2005
- Rank: General

Harald Kujat (born 1 March 1942) is a retired German Air Force four-star general. He served as Chief of Staff of the German armed forces, the Bundeswehr, from 2000 to 2002, and as Chairman of the NATO Military Committee from 2002 to 2005.

== Biography ==
Kujat was born in Mielke, Reichsgau Wartheland (today Poland) to a farmer who died as a soldier in World War II. His mother with her four children fled the advancing Red Army at the end of World War II to Kiel. After passing his Abitur Kujat volunteered for the Luftwaffe in 1959. In 1965 he was promoted to lieutenant and became the staff officer of the German secretary of defense Georg Leber in 1972–1975. Kujat passed the general staff training at the Führungsakademie der Bundeswehr (Hamburg) in 1975–1977 and served as the Staff Officer of Hans Apel in 1977. The same year he took over a department at the Luftwaffenunterstützungsgruppenkommando Nord at Münster and held several positions at the Department of Defense and the German Chancellery in Bonn. In 1985 Kujat became the commanding officer of II. Bataillon, Luftwaffenausbildungsregiment 1 in Appen near Pinneberg.

In 1988 Kujat passed the 72nd course of the NATO Defense College in Rome and was promoted an Oberst in October 1988. In 1989 he became a referent of the German Representative at the Chairman of the Military Committee in Brussels, Branch Chief (Nuclear and Global Arms Control) at the Federal Ministry of Defence in 1990 and Chief of Staff and Deputy German Military Representative to the NATO Military Committee and the Western European Union, Brussels, in 1992–95.

In 1996 Kujat became the Director of the IFOR Co-ordination Centre (ICC), Supreme Headquarters Allied Powers Europe (SHAPE), Mons, Belgium and in October Deputy Director of the NATO International Military Staff in Brussels.

On 10 November 1998, Kujat, now a Generalleutnant, became the Director Policy and Advisory Staff to Rudolf Scharping, the German Minister of Defence, Berlin and on 1 June 2000 the Chief of Staff of the Federal Forces. In 2002 Kujat became the Chairman of the NATO Military Committee until his retirement on 17 June 2005.

Kujat serves as the Chair of the Advisory Council of the Network Centric Operations Industry Consortium.

He is married and has three children.

Since July 2016, Kujat is a member of the Supervisory Board of the Berlin-based Research Institute Dialogue of Civilizations (DOC), allegedly financed by Vladimir Yakunin. It ceased operation in 2021.

Some conservative German media (Bild-Zeitung, Die Welt) criticized Kujat for his pro-Russian views in German TV talk shows, his praise for Russia's bombing raids in Syria were met with misgiving by the German Federal Government.

In 2024 he signed a "joint declaration" with Michael von der Schulenburg in support of China's peace plan, arguing that Ukraine "can no longer win the war, even with more weapons."

== Commentary on the Russian invasion of Ukraine ==
Since the start of the Russian invasion of Ukraine in 2022, Kujat has been a frequent commentator on the war in German-language media, where he has argued for a ceasefire and a negotiated settlement. In August 2023, together with the historian Peter Brandt, the political scientist Hajo Funke and the former chancellery adviser Horst Teltschik, he presented a negotiation proposal that called for a UN-monitored ceasefire followed by peace talks, permanent Ukrainian neutrality outside NATO, a Russian withdrawal to the lines of 23 February 2022, and a later settlement of the status of Crimea and of the Donetsk, Luhansk, Zaporizhzhia and Kherson regions.

Kujat has argued that Ukraine and Russia were close to an agreement at the Istanbul talks in March 2022, and that Western governments – in particular the United Kingdom under Prime Minister Boris Johnson, who visited Kyiv on 9 April 2022 – led Ukraine to abandon the negotiations. He set out this view at length in a reconstruction of the talks, co-written with Funke, that the Berliner Zeitung published in November 2023; the authors stated that their argument did not diminish Russia's responsibility for the invasion. The account is disputed. Johnson has said that during the visit he voiced misgivings about any deal with Putin and promised continued British support, but has called claims that he sabotaged an agreement "total nonsense and Russian propaganda". David Arakhamia, who led the Ukrainian delegation and had said that Johnson advised Kyiv not to sign anything with Russia, also denied that the delegation had been ready to sign or that Johnson had pressured Kyiv not to do so. In a 2024 assessment of the evidence, the historians Klaus Larres and David Zhong concluded that Johnson's visit may have contributed to Zelensky's decision against a deal, while cautioning that further documentary evidence was needed. Writing in Blätter für deutsche und internationale Politik, Paul Schäfer argued that the claim lacked a solid evidential basis and criticised Kujat for relying on Vladimir Putin's account of the events.

In July 2024 the Neue Zürcher Zeitung (NZZ) published a critical profile of Kujat by its journalist Marco Seliger, which argued that Kujat's public statements repeatedly echoed Kremlin narratives. In the article, Klaus Naumann, who had held both of Kujat's senior posts before him, traced Kujat's attitude towards Russia to his earlier involvement in NATO–Russia relations and said that Kujat had not taken on board that Putin had since broken treaties and begun a war of aggression. According to the NZZ, Kujat broke off the interview, held in Neuruppin, after Seliger confronted him with research that contradicted his account of the 2022 negotiations. In a subsequent podcast, Seliger said that Kujat had been right on some points, citing his criticism of Ukrainian attacks on Russian early-warning radars. Kujat lodged complaints with the Swiss Press Council, objecting among other things to the claims that he served Kremlin narratives and had spread falsehoods about the 2022 talks. In a 2026 decision, the council rejected both complaints, finding that the article's pointed headlines were permissible criticism of a public figure, although it said the NZZ should have noted that Kujat had placed the term "special military operation" in quotation marks.

== Awards and decorations ==
- Federal Cross of Merit
- Badge of Honour of the Bundeswehr in Gold
- Medal of the Senate of Hamburg (flood of 1962)
- Commander of the Legion of Honour (France)
- NATO Meritorious Service Medal
- Legion of Merit (United States)
- Xirka Ġieħ ir-Repubblika (Malta)
- Commander's Cross of Merit (Poland)
- Order of the Cross of the Eagle, 1 Class (Estonia)
- Medal "For strengthening of brotherhood of arms" (Russian Federation Ministry of Defence)
- Gold Medal of the Polish Armed Forces
- Commander's Cross of the Order of Merit of the Republic of Hungary, Military Division
- Grand Cordon of the Order of Leopold (Belgium)

Military offices
Preceded by Admiral Guido Venturoni	Chairman of the NATO Military Committee; July 2002 – 17 June 2005	Succeeded by General Raymond Henault
Preceded by General Hans-Peter von Kirchbach	Chief of Staff of the Federal Armed Forces; 1 July 2000–30 June 2002	Succeeded by General Wolfgang Schneiderhan
