= Ulrich de Maizière =

German general (1912–2006)

General Ulrich de Maizière
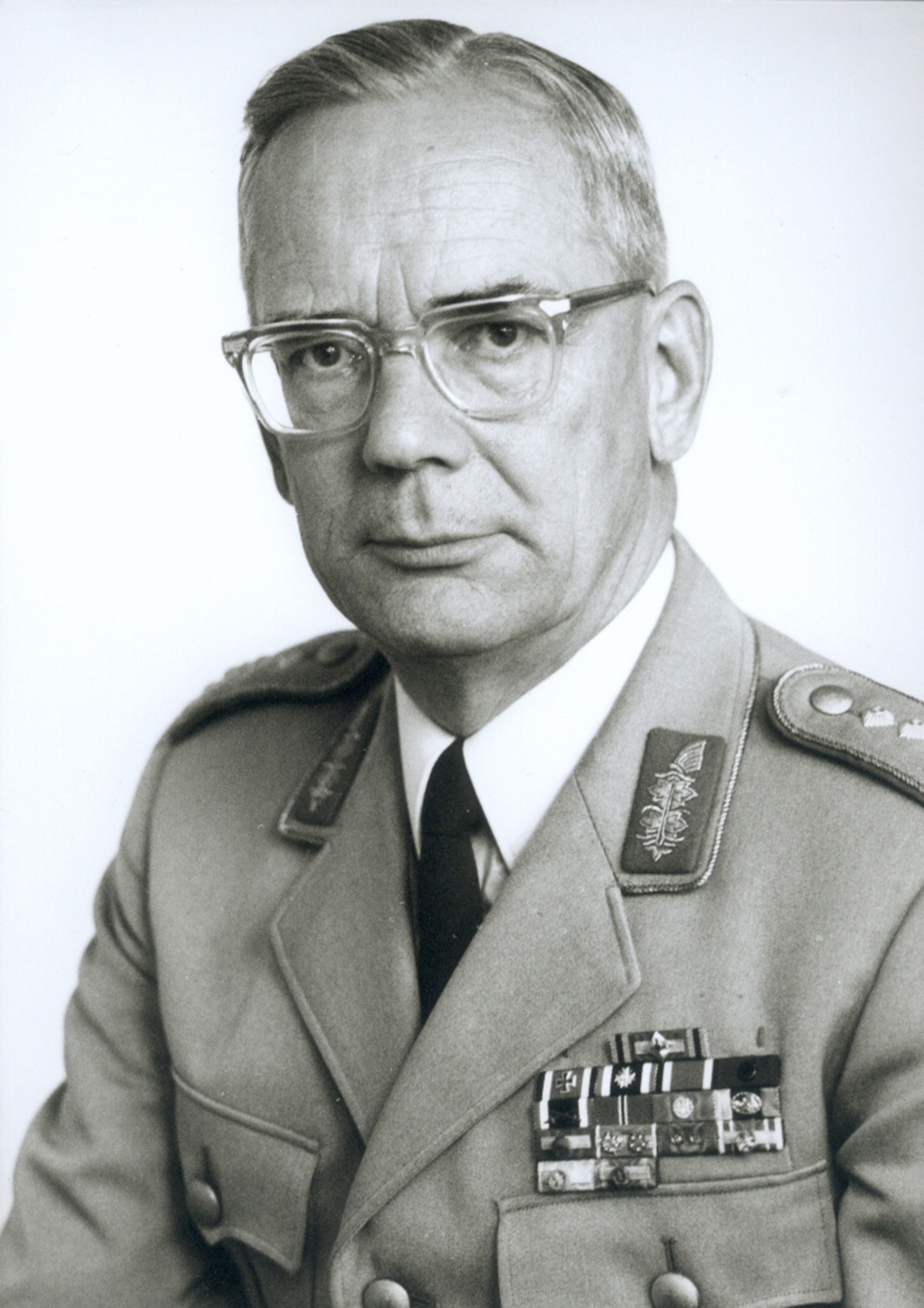
- Maizière in 1969
- Born: 24 February 1912; Stade, Province of Hanover, German Empire
- Died: 26 August 2006 (aged 94); Bonn, North Rhine-Westphalia, Germany
- Military career
- Allegiance: Weimar Republic (1930–1933); Nazi Germany (1933–1945); West Germany
- Branch: Reichswehr; Wehrmacht; German Army
- Service years: 1930–1945; 1955–1972
- Rank: Lieutenant Colonel General
- Commands: Inspector General of the Bundeswehr (1966–1972); Inspector of the Army (1964–1966)
- Conflicts: World War II; Invasion of Poland; Eastern Front; Operation Barbarossa
- Awards: Iron Cross 2nd Class; Iron Cross 1st Class; Commander of the Legion of Merit; Grand Officer of the Legion of Honour; Grand Cross with Star and Sash of the Order of Merit
- Other work: Author

Karl Ernst Ulrich de Maizière (German pronunciation: [də mɛˈzi̯ɛːɐ̯]; 24 February 1912 – 26 August 2006) was a German general. He served in the army of three German states: the Reichswehr of the Weimar Republic, the Wehrmacht of Nazi Germany, and the German Army of West Germany, with a total of 32 years in uniform, the last five as Inspector General of the Bundeswehr. He retired in 1972 at the age of sixty and lived in retirement until his death in August 2006.

== Early life and early military career ==
Maizière was born in Stade on 24 February 1912 to Walter de Maizière, who was a jurist by profession, and Elsbeth (née Dückers). His family was of Huguenot origin, having fled from France in the 1700s. He grew up in Hanover and received his high school certificate in 1930 before joining the Reichswehr in Stettin. From 1931 to 1933 he was at an infantry school in Dresden was promoted several times in the next few years, eventually becoming a captain in 1939.

== Second World War and later military career ==
Maizière took part in the Invasion of Poland and Eastern Front, as an aide to General Adolf Heusinger. In this time he was promoted to lieutenant colonel. Upon the surrender of Germany, he went into British captivity and lived as a civilian from his release to 1955, when he joined the German Army of the new Bundeswehr and worked in the Federal Ministry of Defence (Colonel). From 1960 to 1962, he was commander of the Inner Leadership School.

On 1 April 1962, he became commander of the military academy of the German Armed forces (major general). On 1 October 1964, he was appointed Inspector of the Army (lieutenant general) and on 25 August 1966 the fourth Inspector General of the Bundeswehr (General officer), succeeding Heusinger, holding the position from 1966 to 1972. In 1967 Maizière formally congratulated Field Marshal Erich von Manstein on his 80th birthday. He retired 31 March 1972 succeeded by Armin Zimmermann. During his retirement he wrote the books: Führen im Frieden - 20 Jahre Dienst für Bundeswehr und Staat ("Leading in Freedom: 20 Years Served for Federal Defence and State")(1974) and In der Pflicht - Lebensbericht eines deutschen Soldaten im 20. Jahrhundert ("In Duty - Life Report of a German Soldier in the 20th Century")(1989).

His brother Clemens de Maizière decided to stay in the Soviet-occupied part of Germany and became one of the founding members of the CDU (Ost), his nephew Lothar de Maizière was the last Prime minister of the German Democratic Republic (East Germany), while his son Thomas de Maizière served as Federal Minister of Defence as well as Federal Minister of the Interior.

He belonged to a noble family of French Huguenot origin, originally from Maizières-lès-Metz.

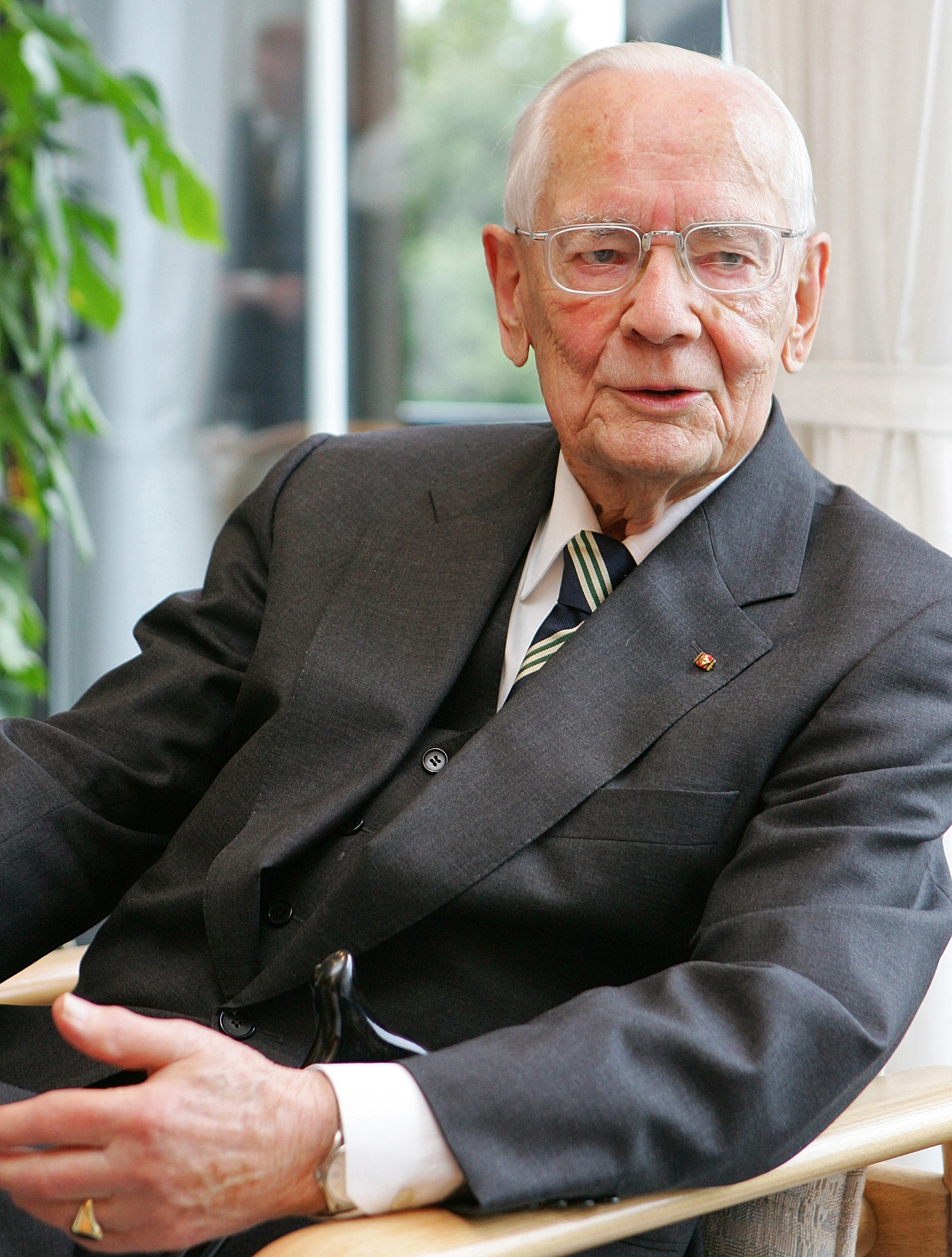
de Maizière on 25 August 2006, age 93

== Dates of rank ==
- Leutnant (Lieutenant)- 1 August 1933
- Oberleutnant (Senior lieutenant)- 1 October 1935
- Hauptmann (Captain)- 1 April 1939
- Major (Major)- 1 April 1942
- Oberstleutnant (Lieutenant colonel)- 1 June 1943
- Oberst (Colonel)- 1955
- Generalmajor (Major general)- 1 April 1962
- Generalleutnant (Lieutenant general)- 1 October 1964
- General (General)- 25 August 1966

Military offices
Preceded by General Heinz Trettner	Inspector General of the Bundeswehr; 25 August 1966 – 31 March 1972	Succeeded by Admiral Armin Zimmermann
Preceded by Generalleutnant Alfred Zerbel	Inspector of the Army; 1 October 1964 – 24 August 1966	Succeeded by Generalleutnant Josef Moll
