= Meissen (electoral district) =

Federal electoral district of Germany

154 Meißen
- Electoral district for the Bundestag
- Meißen in 2025
- State: Saxony
- Population: 241,700 (2019)
- Electorate: 197,004 (2021)
- Major settlements: Radebeul; Riesa; Meissen
- Area: 1,454.6 km^{2}

Current electoral district
- Created: 2009
- Party: AfD
- Member: Christian Reck
- Elected: 2025

Meißen is an electoral constituency (German: Wahlkreis) represented in the Bundestag. It elects one member via first-past-the-post voting. Under the current constituency numbering system, it is designated as constituency 154. It is located in central Saxony, comprising the Meißen district.

Meißen was created for the 2009 federal election. From 2021 to 2025, it was represented by Barbara Lenk of the Alternative for Germany (AfD). Since 2025 it has been represented by Christian Reck of the AfD.

== Geography ==
Meißen is located in central Saxony. As of the 2021 federal election, it is coterminous with the Meißen district.

== History ==
Meißen was created in 2009 and contained parts of the abolished constituencies of Delitzsch – Torgau-Oschatz – Riesa, Kamenz – Hoyerswerda – Großenhain, Dresden II – Meißen I, and Döbeln – Mittweida – Meißen II. In the 2009 election, it was constituency 156 in the numbering system. In the 2013 through 2021 elections, it was number 155. From the 2025 election, it has been number 154. Its borders have not changed since its creation.

== Members ==
The constituency was represented by Thomas de Maizière of the Christian Democratic Union (CDU) from 2009 to 2021. It was won by Barbara Lenk of the Alternative for Germany (AfD) in 2021.

Election	Member	Party	%
2009	Thomas de Maizière	CDU	45.2
2013	Thomas de Maizière	CDU	53.6
2017	Thomas de Maizière	CDU	36.7
2021	Barbara Lenk	AfD	31.0
2025	Christian Reck	AfD	45.3

== Election results ==
=== 2025 election ===
Federal election (2025): Meißen
Notes:	Blue background denotes the winner of the electorate vote. Pink background denotes a candidate elected from their party list. Yellow background denotes an electorate win by a list member, or other incumbent. A ✓ or ✗ denotes status of any incumbent, win or lose respectively.						
Party	Candidate	Votes	%	±%	Party votes	%	±%
AfD	Christian Reck	70,576	45.3	▲14.3	68,155	43.6	▲13.9
CDU	Titus Reime	37,049	23.8	▲1.5	31,182	20.0	▲2.4
BSW					13,865	8.9	New
Left	Jessica Hamann	14,696	9.4	▲2.4	12,236	7.8	▲0.6
SPD	Leonhard Weist	11,412	7.3	▼8.1	11,025	7.1	▼10.6
FDP	Anita Maaß	8,223	5.3	▼4.0	5,919	3.8	▼7.9
Greens	Frank Buchholz	6,530	4.2	▼1.0	7,129	4.6	▼1.4
FW	Steffan Mühlpfordt	5,607	3.6	▼1.3	2,327	1.5	▼1.4
Tierschutzpartei					1,826	1.2	▼0.6
Volt					825	0.5	▲0.3
PARTEI					674	0.4	▼0.8
BD	Nils Zschoke	1,617	1.0	New	663	0.4	New
Pirates					248	0.2	▼0.2
Humanists					111	0.1	▼0.1
MLPD					53	<0.1	0.0
Informal votes		1,473			945		
Total valid votes		155,710			156,238		
Turnout		157,183	81.5	▲5.7			
AfD hold	Majority	33,527	21.5	▲12.8			

=== 2021 election ===
Federal election (2021): Meißen
Notes:	Blue background denotes the winner of the electorate vote. Pink background denotes a candidate elected from their party list. Yellow background denotes an electorate win by a list member, or other incumbent. A ✓ or ✗ denotes status of any incumbent, win or lose respectively.						
Party	Candidate	Votes	%	±%	Party votes	%	±%
AfD	Barbara Lenk	45,705	31.0	0.0	43,940	29.8	▼3.1
CDU	Sebastian Fischer	32,924	22.3	▼14.3	25,912	17.6	▼8.6
SPD	Stephanie Dzeyk	22,771	15.4	▲6.5	26,045	17.6	▲8.9
FDP	Johannes Ramos	13,727	9.3	▲4.0	17,212	11.7	▲2.9
Left	Markus Pohle	10,344	7.0	▼5.7	10,725	7.3	▼6.1
Greens	Karin Beese	7,590	5.1	▲1.8	8,872	6.0	▲2.3
FW	André Langerfeld	7,271	4.9		4,312	2.9	▲1.9
Tierschutzpartei					2,634	1.8	▲0.4
PARTEI	Theresa Bergmann	3,149	2.1		1,754	1.2	▲0.3
dieBasis	Maik Hoppe	2,769	1.9		2,341	1.6	
Gesundheitsforschung					713	0.5	
Pirates					581	0.4	0.0
NPD					566	0.4	▼1.1
ÖDP	Steffen Frank Förster	943	0.6		405	0.3	0.0
Volt					340	0.2	
Team Todenhöfer					321	0.2	
The III. Path					296	0.2	
LKR	Uwe Enge	244	0.2				
Bündnis C					188	0.1	
Humanists					187	0.1	
V-Partei3					108	0.1	▼0.1
MLPD					77	0.1	0.0
DKP					65	0.0	
Informal votes		1,904			1,747		
Total valid votes		147,437			147,594		
Turnout		149,341	75.8	▼0.2			
AfD gain from CDU	Majority	12,781	8.7				

=== 2017 election ===
Federal election (2017): Meißen
Notes:	Blue background denotes the winner of the electorate vote. Pink background denotes a candidate elected from their party list. Yellow background denotes an electorate win by a list member, or other incumbent. A ✓ or ✗ denotes status of any incumbent, win or lose respectively.						
Party	Candidate	Votes	%	±%	Party votes	%	±%
CDU	✓ Thomas de Maizière	55,326	36.7	▼17.0	39,406	26.1	▼19.0
AfD	Carsten Hütter	46,765	31.0		49,615	32.9	▲25.8
Left	Tilo Hellmann	19,122	12.7	▼5.0	20,111	13.3	▼5.3
SPD	Susann Rüthrich	13,486	8.9	▼3.7	13,148	8.7	▼3.9
FDP	Maximilian Andreas Schikore-Pätz	7,991	5.3	▲2.9	13,156	8.7	▲5.0
Greens	Volker Herold	5,051	3.3	0.0	5,531	3.7	▼0.3
NPD	Peter Schreiber	1,928	1.3	▼3.2	2,279	1.5	▼2.4
Tierschutzpartei					2,119	1.4	
FW					1,585	1.1	▼0.3
PARTEI					1,398	0.9	
BGE					601	0.4	
Pirates					579	0.4	▼1.9
ÖDP					389	0.3	
DiB					330	0.2	
BüSo	Ronald Galle	1,263	0.8	▼0.3	312	0.2	▼0.1
V-Partei³					235	0.2	
MLPD					119	0.1	0.0
Informal votes		2,056			2,075		
Total valid votes		150,932			150,913		
Turnout		152,988	76.0	▲5.7			
CDU hold	Majority	8,561	5.7	▼30.2			

=== 2013 election ===
Federal election (2013): Meißen
Notes:	Blue background denotes the winner of the electorate vote. Pink background denotes a candidate elected from their party list. Yellow background denotes an electorate win by a list member, or other incumbent. A ✓ or ✗ denotes status of any incumbent, win or lose respectively.						
Party	Candidate	Votes	%	±%	Party votes	%	±%
CDU	✓ Thomas de Maizière	76,666	53.6	▲8.4	64,622	45.1	▲7.6
Left	Sebastian Scheel	25,279	17.7	▼3.7	26,735	18.7	▼4.0
SPD	Susann Rüthrich	18,090	12.7	▲0.1	18,024	12.6	▼0.5
AfD					10,195	7.1	
NPD	Peter Schreiber	6,463	4.5	▼0.6	5,588	3.9	▼1.1
Greens	Johannes Lichdi	4,817	3.4	▼2.7	5,721	4.0	▼1.8
Pirates	Andreas Bärisch	3,600	2.5		3,252	2.3	
FDP	Jan Mücke	3,461	2.4	▼6.6	5,253	3.7	▼10.9
FW					1,887	1.3	
PRO	Mirko Schmidt	2,979	2.1		1,282	0.9	
BüSo	Thomas Born	1,618	1.1		494	0.3	▼0.5
MLPD					136	0.1	▼0.1
Informal votes		2,706			2,490		
Total valid votes		142,973			143,189		
Turnout		145,679	70.3	▲5.6			
CDU hold	Majority	51,387	35.9	▲12.0			

=== 2009 election ===
Federal election (2009): Meißen
Notes:	Blue background denotes the winner of the electorate vote. Pink background denotes a candidate elected from their party list. Yellow background denotes an electorate win by a list member, or other incumbent. A ✓ or ✗ denotes status of any incumbent, win or lose respectively.						
Party	Candidate	Votes	%	±%	Party votes	%	±%
CDU	Thomas de Maizière	62,290	45.2	▲7.6	51,703	37.5	▲5.5
Left	Hendrik Thalheim	29,423	21.3	▲0.5	31,286	22.7	▲0.9
SPD	Susann Rüthrich	17,236	12.5	▼9.6	17,987	13.1	▼9.0
FDP	Wilhelm Minschke	12,403	9.0	▲2.0	20,052	14.5	▲3.9
Greens	Thoralf Koß	8,315	6.0	▲2.0	7,979	5.8	▲1.3
NPD	Peter Schreiber	7,050	5.1	▼1.6	6,875	5.0	▼1.5
BüSo					1,208	0.9	▲0.1
Independent	Andreas Klingner	1,103	0.8				
REP					404	0.3	0.0
MLPD					327	0.2	▲0.1
Informal votes		2,289			2,288		
Total valid votes		137,820			137,821		
Turnout		140,109	64.7	▼12.1			
CDU win new seat	Majority	32,867	23.9				
