= Christian Reck =

German politician (born 1987)

Member of the Bundestag
- Incumbent
- Assumed office TBD
- Preceded by: Barbara Benkstein
- Constituency: Meissen

Personal details
- Born: 1987 (age 38–39)
- Party: Alternative for Germany (since 2015)

Christian Reck (born 1987) is a German politician who was elected as a member of the Bundestag in 2025. He has been a member of the Alternative for Germany since 2015.
