= Wolfgang Schneiderhan =

Wolfgang Schneiderhan may refer to:

- Wolfgang Schneiderhan (general) (born 1946), former general in the German armed forces
- Wolfgang Schneiderhan (violinist) (1915–2002), Austrian classical violinist
