= Harald Wust =

German Air Force General (1921–2010)

General Harald Wust

Inspector General of the Bundeswehr
- In office 21 December 1976 – 11 December 1978
- Chancellor: Helmut Schmidt
- Preceded by: Armin Zimmermann
- Succeeded by: Jürgen Brandt

Deputy Inspector General of the Bundeswehr
- In office 1 October 1975 – 21 December 1976
- Preceded by: Karl Schnell
- Succeeded by: Rüdiger von Reichert

Chief of the Armed Forces Staff
- In office 1 May 1971 – 31 March 1974
- Preceded by: Bernd Freytag von Loringhoven
- Succeeded by: Ernst-Dieter Bernhard

Personal details
- Born: 14 January 1921 Kiel, Free State of Prussia Weimar Republic
- Died: 2 October 2010 (aged 89) Bonn, North Rhine-Westphalia, Germany

Military service
- Allegiance: Nazi Germany; West Germany
- Branch/service: Luftwaffe; German Air Force
- Years of service: 1941–1945; 1956–1978
- Rank: First Lieutenant General
- Battles/wars: World War II

Harald Wust (14 January 1921 – 2 October 2010) was a General of the German Air Force who served as Inspector General of the Bundeswehr from 1976 until 1978.

== Biography ==
During World War II, Wust served in the Luftwaffe's signals corps. He became a lieutenant in 1941 and later fought as a first lieutenant and company commander on the Eastern Front. In 1945, he was taken prisoner of war by the Soviets.

After returning home from captivity as a prisoner of war, Wust studied social pedagogy, worked for an authority in Eutin and became a children's book author.

In 1956, he joined the newly established German Air Force as a captain and from 1958 to 1959 attended the Air Force's first General Staff Course, where he was trained as a general staff officer. After completing this course, in which he graduated at the top of his class, he served in various staff positions and at training schools. From 1975 to 1976, he was Deputy Inspector General of the German Armed Forces.

Due to a serious injury sustained by the Inspector General, Admiral Armin Zimmermann, Wust served as acting Inspector General from the summer of 1976 until Zimmermann's death on November 30, 1976. On that day, Wust assumed the office of Inspector General of the Bundeswehr, becoming the first Air Force officer to hold the rank of General. Following various internal disputes with officials and officers of the Federal Ministry of Defense and public attacks in connection with the espionage case involving Lothar-Erwin Lutze, Renate Lutze, and Jürgen Wiegel, he resigned prematurely in 1978 and retired. He was succeeded by Jürgen Brandt.

Military offices
Preceded by Admiral Armin Zimmermann	Inspector General of the Bundeswehr; 21 December 1976–11 December 1978	Succeeded by General Jürgen Brandt
Preceded by Generalleutnant Karl Schnell	Deputy Inspector General of the Bundeswehr; 1 October 1975–21 December 1976	Succeeded by Generalleutnant Rüdiger von Reichert]
Preceded by Generalmajor Bernd Freytag von Loringhoven	Chief of the Armed Forces Staff; 1 May 1971– 31 March 1974	Succeeded by Generalmajor Ernst-Dieter Bernhard
