= Heinrich Trettner =

German general

General Heinrich Trettner
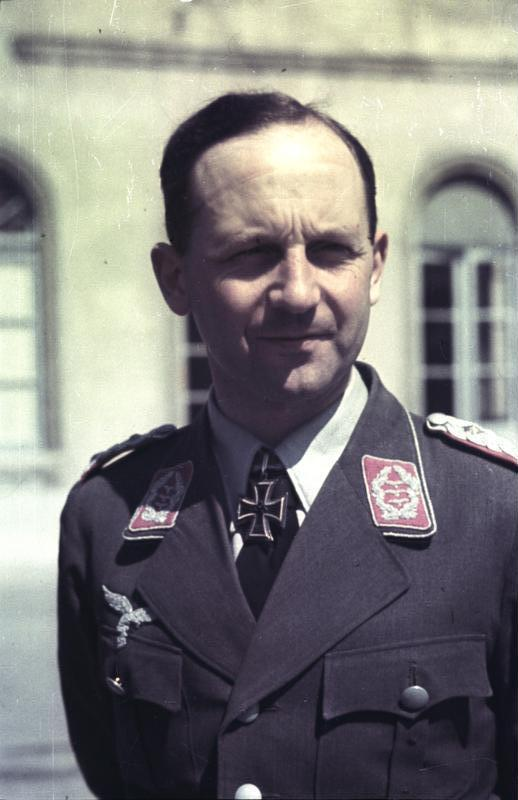
- Trettner, c. 1941-42
- Born: 19 September 1907; Minden, Province of Westphalia, Kingdom of Prussia, German Empire
- Died: 18 September 2006 (aged 98); Mönchengladbach, North Rhine-Westphalia, Germany
- Military career
- Allegiance: Weimar Republic (1925–1933); Nazi Germany (1933–1945); West Germany
- Branch: Reichsheer; Luftwaffe; German Army
- Service years: 1925–1945; 1956–1966
- Rank: Generalleutnant; General
- Commands: Inspector General of the Bundeswehr (1964–1966); 4th Parachute Division (1943–1945); Chief Of Operations of the Staff of the 11th Air Corps (1940–1942)
- Conflicts: Spanish Civil War; World War II
- Awards: Knight's Cross of the Iron Cross with Oak Leaves; Great Cross of Merit

Heinrich "Heinz" Trettner (19 September 1907 – 18 September 2006) was a German general who served in the Spanish Civil War, World War II and the Cold War. From 1964 to 1966, he served as Inspector General of the Bundeswehr, the head of the military of the Federal Republic of Germany. He was the last surviving general of the Wehrmacht.

== Spanish Civil War ==
After completing the third course at the Luftkriegsschule 2 (Air Warfare School) in Berlin, Trettner joined the Condor Legion and served as adjutant and IIa to Generalmajor Hugo Sperrle and Wolfram von Richthofen during the Spanish Civil War. On 2 October 1937, he was made Staffelkapitän of 1./K 88.

== World War II ==
From the start of the war until December 1940, Trettner served as Staff Officer, Operations (Ia) in the Staff of the 7th Air Division until 14 June 1939. He was later appointed Chief Of Operations in the Staff of the 11th Air Corps (15 December 1940 to 6 April 1942), taking part in the airborne operation on Crete. He was promoted to Chief of Staff of the XI. Fliegerkorps, but on 4 October 1943 was reassigned to head formation and become Commanding Officer of the 4th Parachute Division, a command he held until 3 May 1945, when he surrendered to US troops.

== Cold War ==
Trettner was released from internment in April 1948 and worked initially for the charity Caritas. In 1949, he enrolled at the University of Bonn and studied Economics and Jurisprudence, and received his diploma in Economics in 1956. Trettner then joined the Bundeswehr and was transferred to the Supreme Headquarters Allied Powers Europe (SHAPE) in Paris serving as commander of the logistics department until 15 September 1959.

Trettner's 1964 appointment as Inspector General incurred criticism from the East German DDR government. Senior Communist official Albert Norden alleged that Trettner had been involved in the bombing of Guernica, during the Spanish Civil War. In 1965, former Spanish Republican Air Force commander Ignacio Hidalgo de Cisneros made a public statement criticizing Trettner's Bundeswehr appointment. As Inspector General he apparently had a poor relationship with Karl Gumbel, the civilian Deputy Minister of Defence, and objected to taking orders from a civil servant, Gumbel, in the absence of the Minister. He was also opposed to a ruling by the Minister, in the face of a court order, that members of the military could join a union. These factors led to his resignation, which nearly coincided with that of Werner Panitzki, the chief of staff of the Air Force.

Trettner was one of the umpires for the 1974 Sandhurst wargame on Operation Sea Lion. Heinrich Trettner was Catholic, and in 1978 he published an article, "The Holy See and Disarmament", in the German-language edition of the Vatican literary journal Communio, and a corresponding reply the next year.

Trettner died one day before his 99th birthday. He was the last living general of the Wehrmacht.

== Awards ==
- Cruz de Guerra de España (30 September 1938)
- Medalla de la Campaña de España (1 December 1938)
- Spanish Cross in Gold (6 June 1939)
- Wehrmacht Long Service Award 4th to 2nd Class
- Wound Badge (1939) in Black (3 March 1944)
- Iron Cross (1939) 2nd Class (12 May 1940) & 1st Class (12 May 1940)
- Combined Pilots-Observation Badge in Gold with Diamonds
- Knight's Cross of the Iron Cross with Oak Leaves
  - Knight's Cross on 24 May 1940 as Major in the general staff and Ia (operations officer) of the 7. Flieger-Division
  - 586th Oak Leaves on 17 September 1944 as Generalmajor and commander of the 4. Fallschirmjäger-Division
- Legion of Merit (USA) (1 November 1964)
- Knight Commander of the Royal Victorian Order (Great Britain) (18 May 1965)
- Grand Cross of the Order of George I (Kingdom of Greece) (16 July 1965)
- Grand Officer of the Order of Merit of the Italian Republic (Grande Ufficiale Ordine al Merito della Repubblica Italiana) (Italy) (8 August 1965)
- Grand Cross with Star and Sash of the Order of Merit of the Federal Republic of Germany (18 January 1967)
- Grand Officier of the Légion d'honneur (France) (31 December 1969)

Military offices
Preceded by General Friedrich Foertsch	Inspector General of the Bundeswehr; 1 January 1964 – 25 August 1966	Succeeded by General Ulrich de Maizière
