= Maizière family =

German noble family

The Maizière family is a German noble family of Huguenot ancestry that migrated from the Duchy of Lorraine to what is now Germany in the late 17th century. Several family members have had and still have important roles in German politics and business.

The name derives from Maizières-lès-Metz, a village in the Moselle department, now in France, with which ancestors were connected.

== Important family members ==
- Gustav Maiziere, doctor
  - Ernst de Maizières (1841–1898), Landgerichtspräsident of Neuruppin and one of the authors of the civil code of Germany.
    - Walter de Maizière (1876–1915), lawyer
      - Clemens de Maizière (1906–1980), GDR lawyer, Member of the Ost-CDU and a Stasi spy
        - Lothar de Maizière (born 1940), GDR lawyer, Member of the Ost-CDU, later the only democratically elected Prime Minister of East Germany
      - Ulrich de Maizière (1912–2006), Chief of staff of the Bundeswehr 1966–1972
        - Andreas de Maizière (born 1950), former member of Commerzbank's board of directors
        - Thomas de Maizière (born 1954), Chief of the Chancellor's Office and later Minister in the cabinet of Angela Merkel
