= Michael von der Schulenburg =

German diplomat

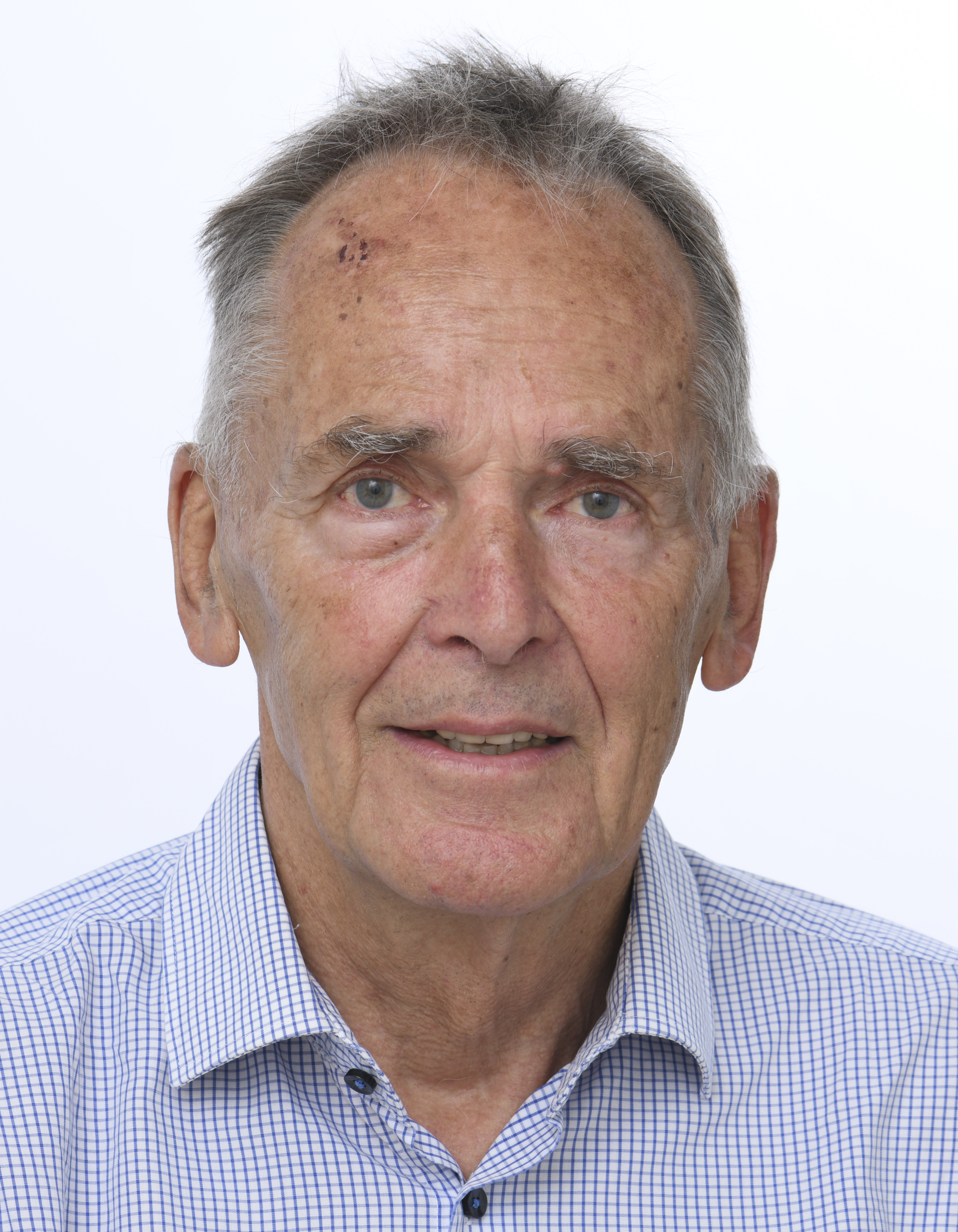
- Official portrait, 2024

Member of the European Parliament for Germany
- Incumbent
- Assumed office 16 July 2024

Personal details
- Born: Michael Sergius Graf von der Schulenburg; 16 October 1948 (age 78) Munich, West Germany
- Party: BSW (2024–present)
- Education: Free University of Berlin; École nationale d'administration
- Occupation: Diplomat • Politician

Michael Sergius Graf von der Schulenburg (born 16 October 1948) is a member of the European Parliament and a German former diplomat with the United Nations and with the Organization for Security and Cooperation in Europe (OSCE). Between 2005 and 2012 he worked at the rank of Assistant Secretary-General of the UN Department of Political and Peacebuilding Affairs and as an Executive Representative for peace missions in Iraq and Sierra Leone.

== Life and career ==
Michael von der Schulenburg is a descendant of the German noble family of House von der Schulenburg. He was born in Munich. He earned degrees from the Free University in West Berlin, the London School of Economics, and the École Nationale d’Administration.

He worked for the UN for 30 years – in assignments in Haiti, Pakistan, Afghanistan, Iran, Iraq and Sierra Leone, among others. When serving at the United Nations Integrated Peacebuilding Office in Sierra Leone (UNIPSIL) as the highest UN representative in Sierra Leone (Executive Representative of the Secretary-General – ERSG), he came into conflict with the government over the implementation of the Lomé Peace Agreement, police arming and the forthcoming presidential elections. In 2012, he was asked to leave the country.

In 2001 Schulenburg accused Pino Arlacchi, the Director General of the UN in Vienna and of the UN Office for Drug Control and Crime Prevention, in a confidential letter that was later leaked to the press, that the office under Arlacchi's leadership suffered from fear, intimidation and a general lack of transparency. An official UN investigation later confirmed the accused mismanagement practices.

In 2009 Schulenburg put himself at risk in Sierra Leone to save 22 youths of the opposition from being lynched by a large crowd that was attacking the opposition's headquarters.

Since his retirement from the UN, Schulenburg worked as an advisor and as a publicist. In 2017, he published his book On Building Peace – Rescuing the Nation-State and Saving the United Nations.

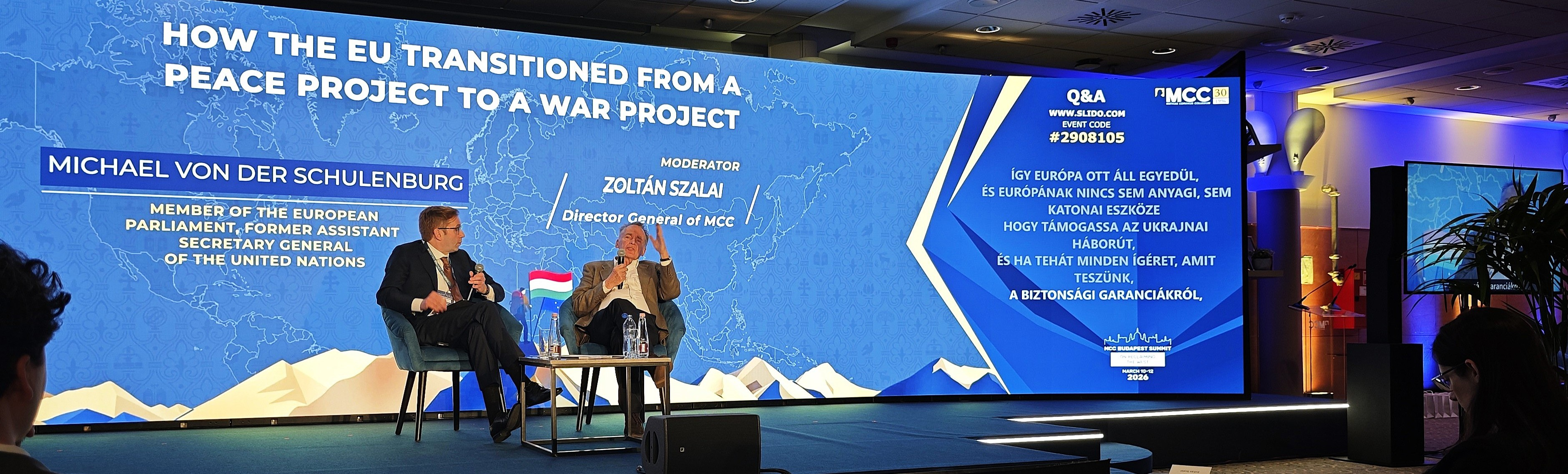
Michael von de Schulenburg speaking at MCC Budapest Lectures in March 2026

In 2020, Sierra Leonean President Julius Maada Bio awarded Schulenburg the highest honour of the country in recognition of his contributions to maintain peace in Sierra Leone, and made him Grand Commander of the Order of the Republic (GCOR).

In 2024 he signed a "joint declaration" with Harald Kujat in support of China's "peace plan", arguing that Ukraine "can no longer win the war, even with more weapons."

Since the election in 2024 he has been serving as a Member of the European Parliament as deputy of Sahra Wagenknecht Alliance.

In 2025, he travelled to Moscow to celebrate Victory Day (9 May).

== Publications ==
(2017). On Building Peace – Rescuing the Nation-State and Saving the United Nations. Amsterdam University Press. ISBN 978-946298-427-1

In this book, von der Schulenburg argues that peace cannot be imposed from above but must emerge from functioning, sovereign states with legitimate governance. He claims that external interventions, such as in Iraq and Afghanistan, often destabilize rather than rebuild because of their neglect of local political structures. In his view, the United Nations has drifted from its original mission and become a tool for powerful states. He wants it refocused on enabling states to manage their own peace processes, not on dictating terms.
