= Cor de Jager =

Dutch military officer (1925–2001)

General Cor de Jager
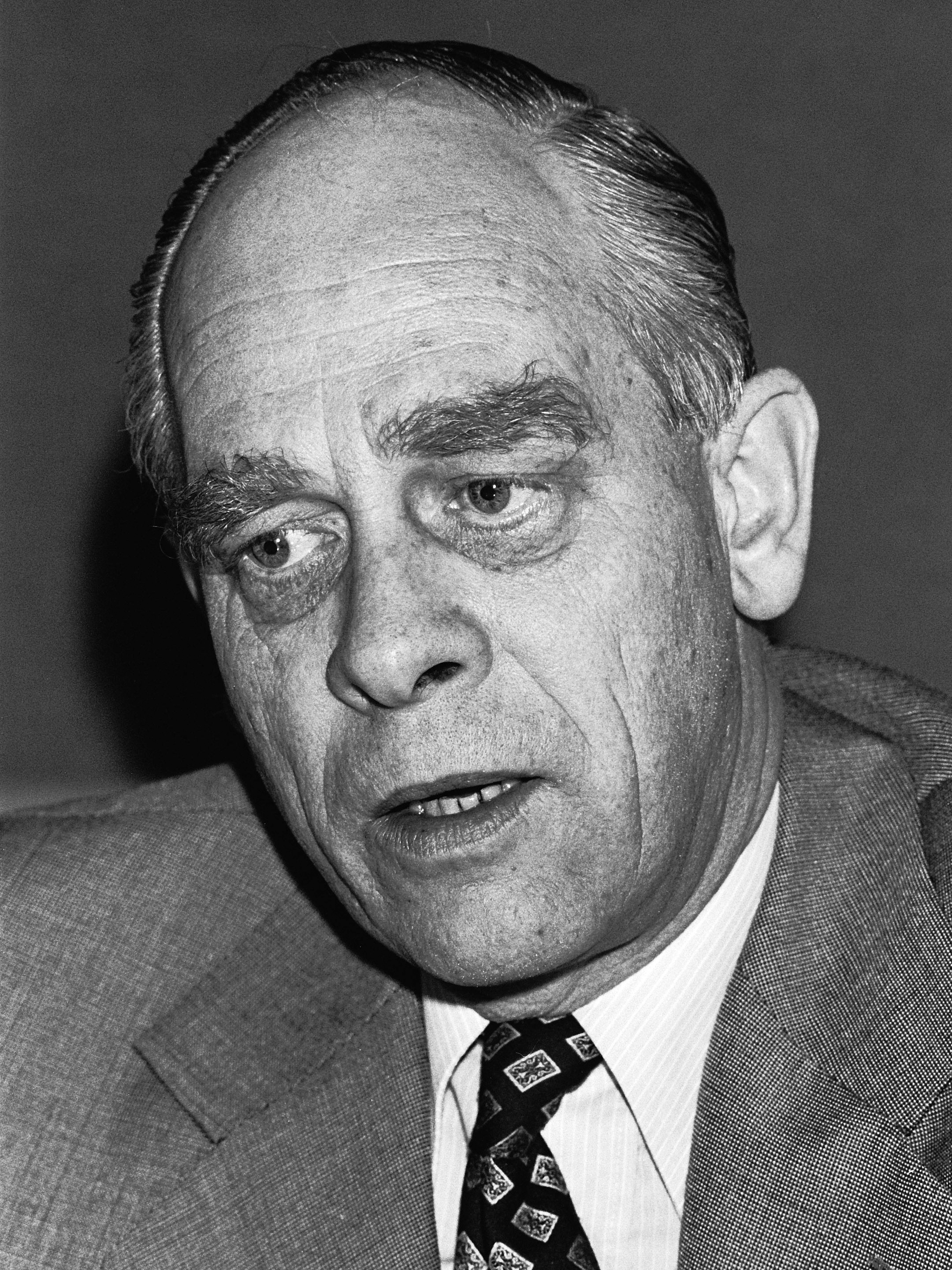
- De Jager in 1979

Chair of the NATO Military Committee
- In office November 1983 – 30 September 1986
- Preceded by: Robert Hilborn Falls
- Succeeded by: Wolfgang Altenburg

Chiefs of the Defence Staff
- In office 1 November 1980 – 5 July 1983
- Preceded by: General Robbie Wijting
- Succeeded by: General Govert Huijser

Personal details
- Born: Cornelis de Jager; 17 August 1925 Oostburg, Netherlands
- Died: 1 December 2001 (aged 76) Bosch en Duin, Netherlands

Military service
- Allegiance: Netherlands
- Branch/service: Royal Netherlands Army
- Years of service: 1949-1986
- Rank: General

General Cornelis "Cor" de Jager (17 August 1925 – 1 December 2001) was an officer of the Royal Netherlands Army. He was Chief of the Defence Staff from 1980 to 1983 and Chairman of the NATO Military Committee from 1983 to 1986.

== Selected publications ==
- "NATO's Strategy", NATO Review, 34/5 (October 1986).
