= Inspector General of the Bundeswehr =

Highest-ranking military position in the modern German military

- Generalinspekteur der Bundeswehr (German)
- Flag of the Inspector General

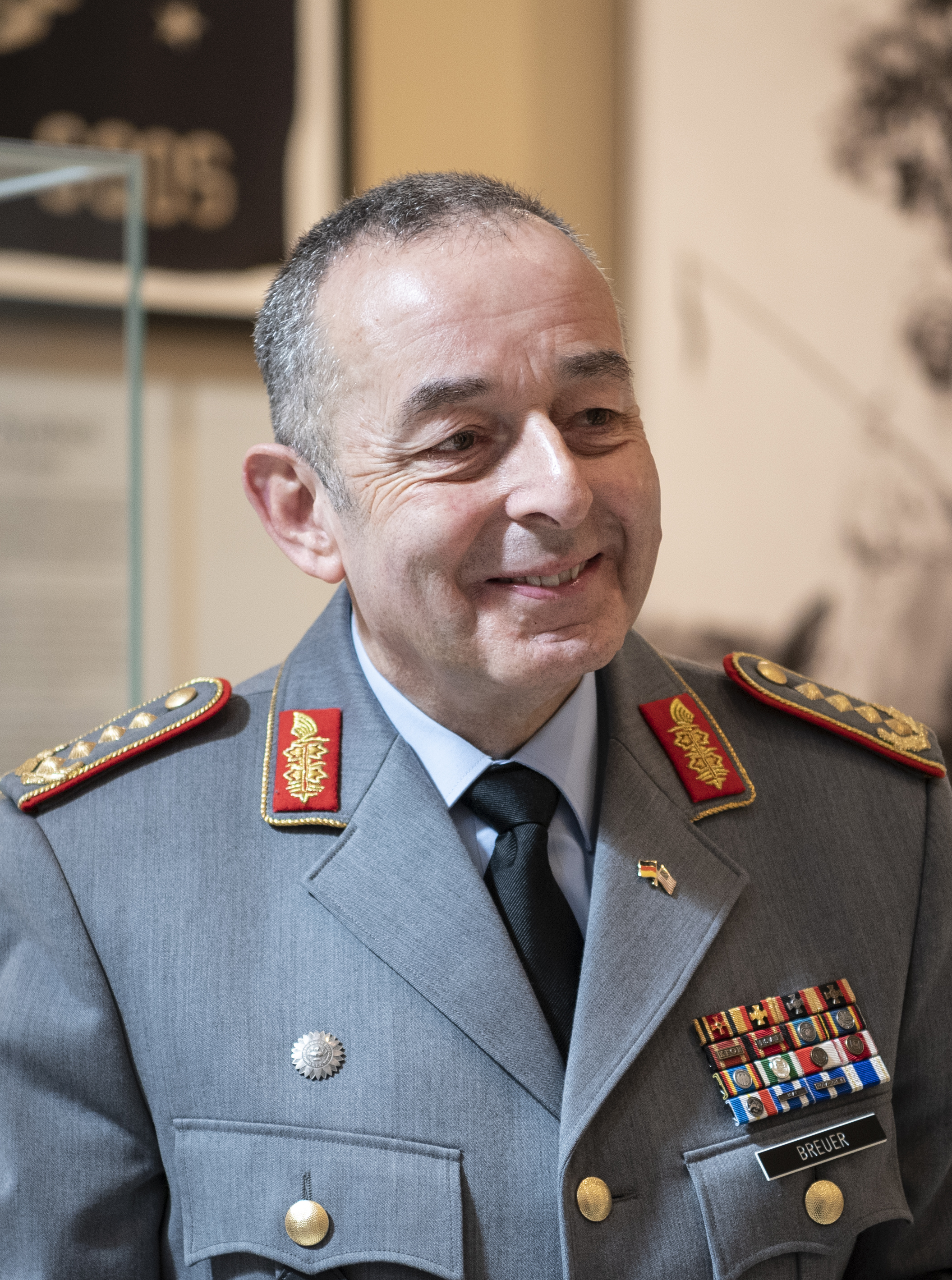
- Incumbent; General Carsten Breuer since 17 March 2023
- Federal Ministry of Defence
- Abbreviation: IGBW
- Member of: Ministry of Defence Executive Group
- Reports to: Federal Minister of Defence
- Precursor: Oberkommando der Wehrmacht
- Formation: 1 June 1957
- First holder: General Adolf Heusinger
- Deputy: Deputy Inspector General of the Bundeswehr
- Website: Official Website

The Inspector General of the Bundeswehr (German: Generalinspekteur der Bundeswehr, GenInspBw), is the highest-ranking military position held by a commissioned officer on active duty in the Bundeswehr, the present-day armed forces of Germany.

All Inspectors General have been of the rank of a (four-star) general or admiral, and they head the Führungsstab der Streitkräfte, the German Defence Staff within the Federal Ministry of Defence, and is the direct military advisor to the Federal Minister of Defence who, in peacetime according to the Basic Law for the Federal Republic of Germany, is the default holder of the supreme command authority (German: Inhaber der Befehls- und Kommandogewalt) to ensure civilian control of the military.

The Inspector General is responsible for the overall military defense concept of the Bundeswehr, including the overall planning, preparation, as well as assessment of the whole Bundeswehr operations. Subordinate to the Inspector General are the commanders of the branches of the Bundeswehr, the Inspector of the Army, Inspector of the Air Force, and Inspector of the Navy, and the commanders of the Joint Support Service and Joint Medical Service.

== Title and translations ==
While the official English translation of the position is "Chief of Defence", the German term "Generalinspekteur" – "Inspector General" – was specifically created to avoid the title "Generalstabschef" ("Chief of the General Staff") deemed historically compromised. When the Bundeswehr was created in 1955, many traditional military terms were considered inappropriate after the German Wehrmacht's conduct in World War II. Therefore, the Bundeswehr has no "General Staff" but rather a "Joint Force Command".

== List of officeholders ==
No.	Portrait	Inspector General	Took office	Left office	Time in office	Defence branch	Federal Minister of Defence	Ref.
1	Adolf Heusinger	General; Adolf Heusinger (1897–1982)	1 June 1957	31 March 1961	3 years, 303 days	Land Force	Franz Josef Strauß	–
2	Friedrich Foertsch	General; Friedrich Foertsch (1900–1976)	1 April 1961	31 December 1963	2 years, 274 days	Land Force	Franz Josef Strauß; Kai-Uwe von Hassel	–
3	Heinz Trettner	General; Heinz Trettner (1907–2006)	1 January 1964	25 August 1966	2 years, 236 days	Land Force	Kai-Uwe von Hassel	–
4	Ulrich de Maizière	General; Ulrich de Maizière (1912–2006)	25 August 1966	31 March 1972	5 years, 219 days	Land Force	Kai-Uwe von Hassel; Gerhard Schröder; Helmut Schmidt	–
5	Armin Zimmermann	Admiral; Armin Zimmermann (1917–1976)	1 April 1972	30 November 1976	4 years, 243 days	Navy	Georg Leber	–
6	Harald Wust	General; Harald Wust (1921–2010)	21 December 1976	11 December 1978	1 year, 355 days	Air Force	Georg Leber	–
7	Jürgen Brandt	General; Jürgen Brandt (1922–2003)	12 December 1978	31 March 1983	4 years, 109 days	Land Force	Hans Apel; Manfred Wörner	–
8	Wolfgang Altenburg	General; Wolfgang Altenburg (1928–2023)	1 April 1983	30 September 1986	3 years, 182 days	Land Force	Manfred Wörner	–
9	Dieter Wellershoff	Admiral; Dieter Wellershoff (1933–2005)	1 October 1986	30 September 1991	4 years, 364 days	Navy	Manfred Wörner; Rupert Scholz; Gerhard Stoltenberg	–
10	Klaus Naumann	General; Klaus Naumann (born 1939)	1 October 1991	8 February 1996	4 years, 130 days	Land Force	Gerhard Stoltenberg; Volker Rühe	–
11	Hartmut Bagger	General; Hartmut Bagger (1938–2024)	8 February 1996	31 March 1999	3 years, 51 days	Land Force	Volker Rühe; Rudolf Scharping	–
12	Hans-Peter von Kirchbach	General; Hans-Peter von Kirchbach (born 1941)	1 April 1999	30 June 2000	1 year, 90 days	Land Force	Rudolf Scharping	–
13	Harald Kujat	General; Harald Kujat (born 1942)	1 July 2000	30 June 2002	1 year, 364 days	Air Force	Rudolf Scharping	–
14	Wolfgang Schneiderhan	General; Wolfgang Schneiderhan (born 1946)	1 July 2002	26 November 2009	7 years, 148 days	Land Force	Rudolf Scharping; Peter Struck; Franz Josef Jung; Karl-Theodor zu Guttenberg	–
–	Johann-Georg Dora [de]	Lieutenant General; Johann-Georg Dora (born 1948); Acting	27 November 2009	21 January 2010	55 days	Air Force	Karl-Theodor zu Guttenberg	–
15	Volker Wieker	General; Volker Wieker (born 1954)	21 January 2010	19 April 2018	8 years, 88 days	Land Force	Karl-Theodor zu Guttenberg; Thomas de Maizière; Ursula von der Leyen	–
16	Eberhard Zorn	General; Eberhard Zorn (born 1960)	19 April 2018	17 March 2023	4 years, 332 days	Land Force	Ursula von der Leyen; Annegret Kramp-Karrenbauer; Christine Lambrecht; Boris Pistorius	–
17	Carsten Breuer	General; Carsten Breuer (born 1964)	17 March 2023	Incumbent	3 years, 201 days	Land Force	Boris Pistorius	–

== See also ==
- Inspector of the Army
- Inspector of the Navy
- Inspector of the Air Force
