= Armin Zimmermann =

German admiral (1917–1976)

Admiral Armin Zimmermann
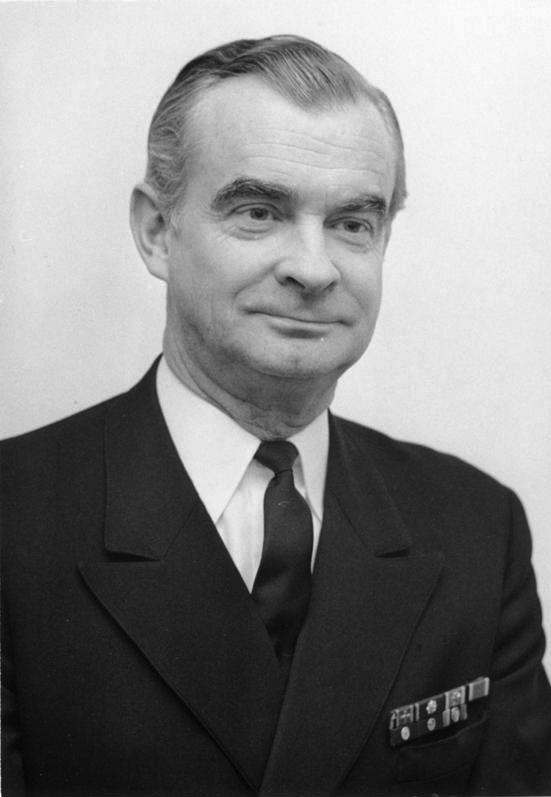
- Official portrait of Admiral Zimmermann
- Born: 23 December 1917; Blumenau, Santa Catarina, Brazil
- Died: 30 November 1976 (aged 58); Bonn, West Germany
- Military career
- Allegiance: Nazi Germany (1937–1945); Allied-occupied Germany (1945–1956); West Germany (1956–1976)
- Branch: Kriegsmarine; GMSA; German Navy
- Service years: 1937–1976
- Rank: Admiral
- Commands: Inspector General of the Bundeswehr (1972–1976); Fleet Commander (1970–1972); North Sea Naval Forces (1968–1970)

Armin Zimmermann (23 December 1917 – 30 November 1976) was a German admiral and Inspector General of the Bundeswehr from 1 April 1972 until 30 November 1976. He joined the Kriegsmarine in 1937.

== Biography ==
Zimmermann, the son of a school superintendent, joined the Kriegsmarine as an Officer candidate in April 1937. At the beginning of the Second World War, he was an ensign in a minesweeping squadron under Captain Friedrich Ruge. Promoted to Lieutenant, he became commanding officer of a minesweeper in the spring of 1940 and of a minehunter in 1942. After a brief period at the War Academy, he was appointed flotilla commander of the 46th Minesweeping Flotilla in the English Channel area, making him the youngest Flotilla commander in the Kriegsmarine.There, he played a key role in planning the raid on Granville on March 9 , 1945, one of the Kriegsmarine's last offensive actions.He was severely wounded in the war. Zimmermann received the German Cross in Gold, the highest military decoration awarded to him.

At the end of the war, he was taken prisoner of war by the British in the Channel Islands. Afterwards, until 1947, he served with the German Mine Clearance Service as commander of a minelayer, commander of a minelayer flotilla, and liaison officer to the British staff. In these roles, he participated in the clearing of sea mines off the German coast. In early 1948, he joined the Cuxhaven Mine Clearance Unit, where he continued his work. After its disbandment in the summer of 1951, he remained in Cuxhaven and became head of the Mine Control Expert Group at the Naval Service Group (Royal Navy).

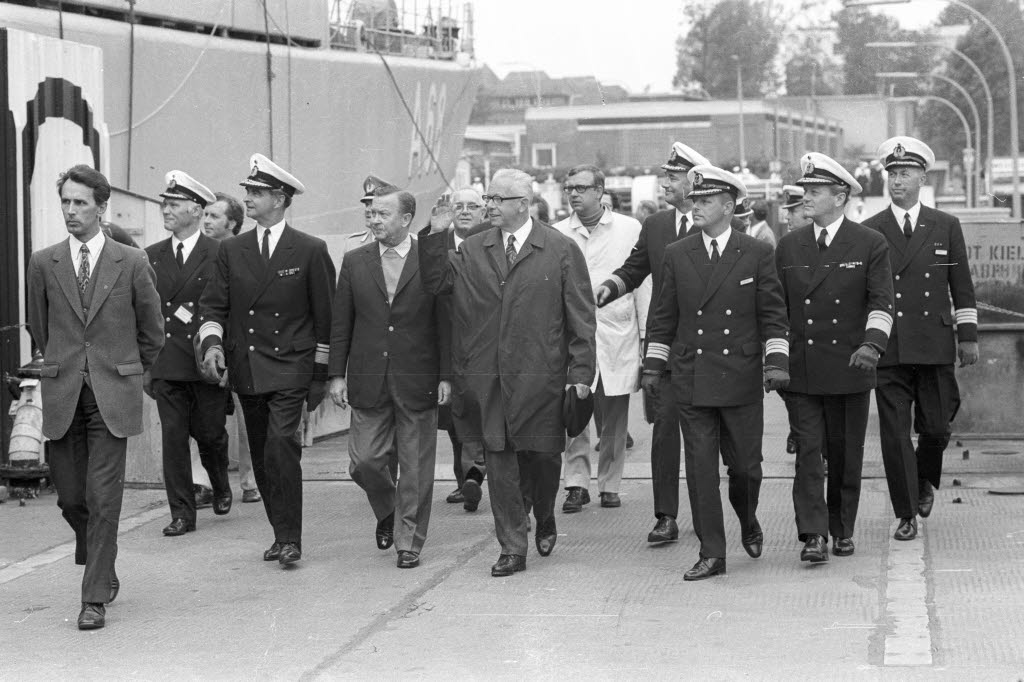
Armin Zimmermann (third from left) during the visit of Federal President Gustav Heinemann on the tender WERRA (A 68) in Tirpitzhafen for Kiel Week, June 20, 1971

In 1956, Zimmermann was accepted into the newly formed German Navy as a Lieutenant Commander. He served for a time as German naval attaché in London and as squadron commander of a minesweeping squadron. He was repeatedly assigned to the Federal Ministry of Defense and held the positions of Commander of the North Sea Naval Forces and Commander of the Fleet. On April 1, 1972, Admiral Zimmermann became the first naval officer to be appointed Inspector General of the Bundeswehr. In October 1976, he was awarded the Grand Cross with Star of the Order of Merit of the Federal Republic of Germany. In June 1976, Zimmermann suffered a severe head injury during a fainting spell resulting from a war wound, and died in office on November 30, 1976, from the consequences of this injury.

His daughter married the gynecologist Henning Kühnle.

The Admiral Armin Zimmermann Barracks, primarily used by the German Navy, is located in the Sengwarden district of Wilhelmshaven.

== Awards ==
- German Cross in Gold on 4 March 1942 as Oberleutnant zur See on R-45 in the 4. Räumboots-Flottille

Military offices
Preceded by General Ulrich de Maizière	Inspector General of the Bundeswehr; 1 April 1972–30 November 1976	Succeeded by General Harald Wust
Preceded by Vizeadmiral Karl Hetz	Fleet Commander; 1970–1972	Succeeded by Vizeadmiral Paul Hartwig
Preceded by Flottillenadmiral Hans-Helmut Klose	Commander of the North Sea Naval Forces; 1968–1970	Succeeded by Flottillenadmiral Karl Hetz
