= Wolfgang Schneiderhan (general) =

German general

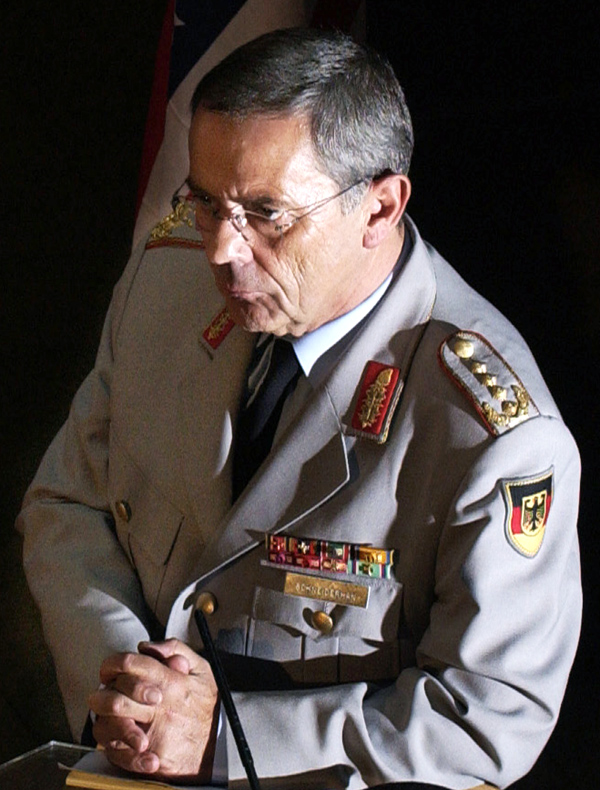
- General Wolfgang Schneiderhan
- Born: 26 July 1946 (age 80); Riedlingen, Württemberg-Hohenzollern, French Zone of Occupation of Germany
- Military career
- Allegiance: Germany
- Service years: 1966–2009
- Rank: General
- Awards: Bundesverdienstkreuz, First Class; Bundeswehr Cross of Honour in Gold; Legion of Honour (France); Legion of Merit (U.S.); Grand Officer of the Order of the Crown (Belgium); Eagle's Cross, First Class (Estonia); Medal of Merit, First Class, of the Ministry of Defence (Czech Republic); Grand Gross of Military Merit (Jordan)

Wolfgang Schneiderhan (born 26 July 1946) is a German general who served as Inspector General of the Bundeswehr from 2002 to 2009.

== Military career ==
Born in Riedlingen, Schneiderhan entered military service on 4 April 1966 as officer cadet (Panzerdivision, Heer). On 1 October 1968, he was promoted to Lieutenant. While serving in the Bundeswehr, Schneiderhan was awarded several medals, both in Germany and abroad. On 27 July 2002, he was promoted to General and was appointed Chief of Staff for the Bundeswehr, the highest-ranking military post in the German armed forces. Before his appointment, he served as director of planning in the Ministry of Defence.

He was the first Inspector-General of the Bundeswehr born after the surrender of Germany and World War II.

== Resignation ==
On 26 November 2009, he tendered his resignation as Inspector General after allegations were made against him of a cover-up relating to the 4 September 2009 Kunduz airstrike in Afghanistan. The strike was against two fuel tankers that had been hijacked by the Taliban but also resulted in the deaths of dozens of civilians. Schneiderhan was alleged to have failed to provide full information about the incident for several days after the incident maintaining that no civilians had been caught in the strike. The then Defence Minister, Franz Josef Jung, also played down the possibility of civilian casualties. A video taken by the American F-15 Eagle fighter bomber involved in the airstrike was leaked to the newspaper Bild and is said to have clearly depicted civilians in the target area.

Schneiderhan's resignation came on the same day as that of Peter Wichert, one of the two then-serving Secretaries of State in the Defence Ministry. The combined resignations were described as Germany's "biggest military shake-up in more than two decades" and have been claimed as proof that the defence ministry actively suppressed information about the incident.

Jung tendered his resignation as Minister of Labour and Social Affairs on 27 November 2009 because of this affair.

== Family ==
Schneiderhan is married to Elke (née Speckhardt). He has two daughters and three sons. The general is the nephew of violinist Wolfgang Schneiderhan. Since November 2014 he is the vice-president of German War Graves Commission.

== Honours and awards ==
- – Great Cross of Merit of the Federal Republic of Germany
- – Golden Cross of Honour of the Bundeswehr
- – Grand Cordon of the Order of Military Merit (Jordan)
- – Eagle's Cross, First Class (Estonia)
- – Grand Officer of the Order of the Crown (Belgium)
- – Grand Decoration of Honour in Silver with Star for Services to the Republic of Austria
- – Commander of the Legion of Honour (France)
- – Officer of the National Order of Merit (France)
- – Commander of the Legion of Merit (United States)
- – Grand Officer of the Order of the Crown (Belgium)
- – Medal of Merit, First Class, of the Ministry of Defence (Czech Republic)

Military offices
Preceded by Hans-Christian Beck	Commander 39 Armoured Brigade ("Thuringia"); 1994–1997	Succeeded by Guenter Weiler
Unknown	Deputy Chief of Staff (Planning); 1997–1999	Unknown
Unknown	Head of Military Policy and Management; 1999–2000	Unknown
Preceded by Harald Kujat	Bundeswehr Director of Planning; 2000–2002	Succeeded by Franz Borkenhagen; Political, not military
Preceded by Harald Kujat	Chief of Staff of the Federal Armed Forces; 1 July 2002–26 November 2009	Succeeded by Volker Wieker
