= Susann Rüthrich =

German politician

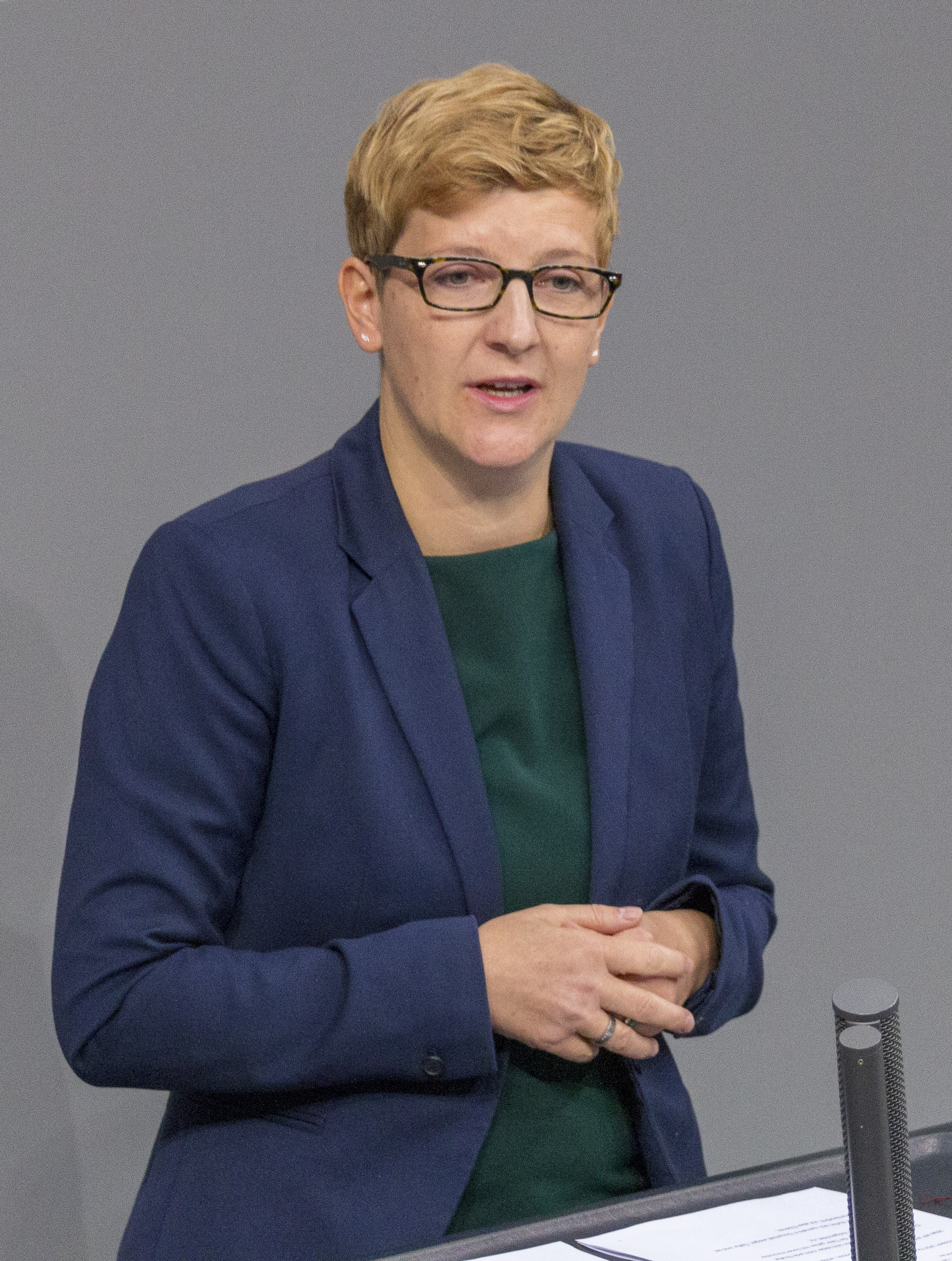
- Rüthrich in 2020

Member of the Bundestag
- Incumbent
- Assumed office 2013

Personal details
- Born: 21 July 1977 (age 49) Meißen, East Germany
- Party: SPD
- Education: University of Hagen

Susann Rüthrich (born 21 July 1977) is a German politician of the Social Democratic Party (SPD) who has been serving as a member of the Bundestag from the state of Saxony since 2013.

== Political career ==
Rüthrich became a member of the Bundestag in the 2013 German federal election. In parliament, she is a member of the Committee on Families, Senior Citizens, Women and Youth.

She contested the Meißen constituency in 2009, 2013 and 2017.

== Other activities ==
- Federal Agency for Civic Education (BPB), Alternate Member of the Board of Trustees (2018–2021)
- Magnus Hirschfeld Foundation, Member of the Board of Trustees
