= Ninino =

- Village
- Location within Poland
- Coordinates: 52°48′N 16°52′E
- Country: Poland
- Voivodeship: Greater Poland
- County: Oborniki
- Gmina: Ryczywół

Ninino [niˈninɔ] is a village in the administrative district of Gmina Ryczywół, within Oborniki County, Greater Poland Voivodeship, in west-central Poland.

== Notable residents ==
- Harald Kujat (born 1942), German general
