= 4th Parachute Division =

German WWII airborne division

- German: 4. Fallschirmjäger-Division
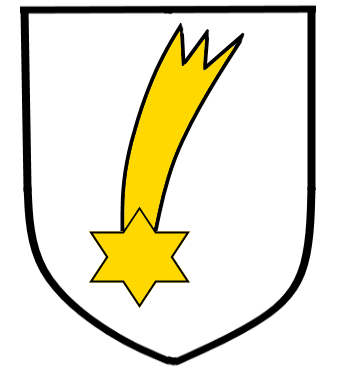
- Divisional insignia
- Active: 1943–1945
- Country: Germany
- Branch: Luftwaffe
- Type: Fallschirmjäger
- Size: Division
- Part of: I Parachute Corps
- Engagements: Battle of Anzio

Commanders
- Notable commanders: Heinrich Trettner

The 4th Parachute Division, (German: 4. Fallschirmjäger-Division), was a divisional-sized formation in the Luftwaffe during World War II.

== History ==
It was formed in Venice, Italy, in November 1943, from elements of the 2 Fallschirmjäger Division and the XII Battalion of the Italian paratrooper regiment 184th Infantry Regiment "Nembo". Its first combat action was against the Allied landings at Anzio (Operation Shingle) as part of the I. Fallschirm Korps in January 1944.

After Anzio, the division fought a rear guard action in front of Rome, and was the last German unit to leave the city on 4 June; it withdrew towards Viterbo, Siena and Florence and then managed to halt the Allies at the Futa pass.
In the winter of 1944/1945 it was positioned on the Gothic Line. In March 1945, the division had to send the II Battalion, 12 Fallschirmjäger Regiment and the 2nd Company from the Pionier Battalion to the new 10 Fallschirmjager Division, which was being formed in Austria. It then fought at Rimini and Bologna and surrendered to the Allies on May 2, 1945.

== War crimes ==
The division has been implicated in Pedescala massacre (Veneto), between 30 April and 2 May 1945, when 63 civilians were executed.

== Order of battle ==
Structure of the division:

- Headquarters
- 10th Parachute Regiment
- 11th Parachute Regiment
- 12th Parachute Regiment
- 4th Parachute Artillery Regiment
- 4th Parachute Tank Destroyer Battalion
- 4th Parachute Engineer Battalion
- 4th Parachute Signal Battalion
- 4th Parachute Anti-Aircraft Battalion
- 4th Parachute Heavy Mortar Battalion
- 4th Parachute Field Replacement Battalion
- 4th Parachute Divisional Supply Group

== Commander ==
- Heinrich Trettner
