= Maizières-lès-Metz =

- Commune
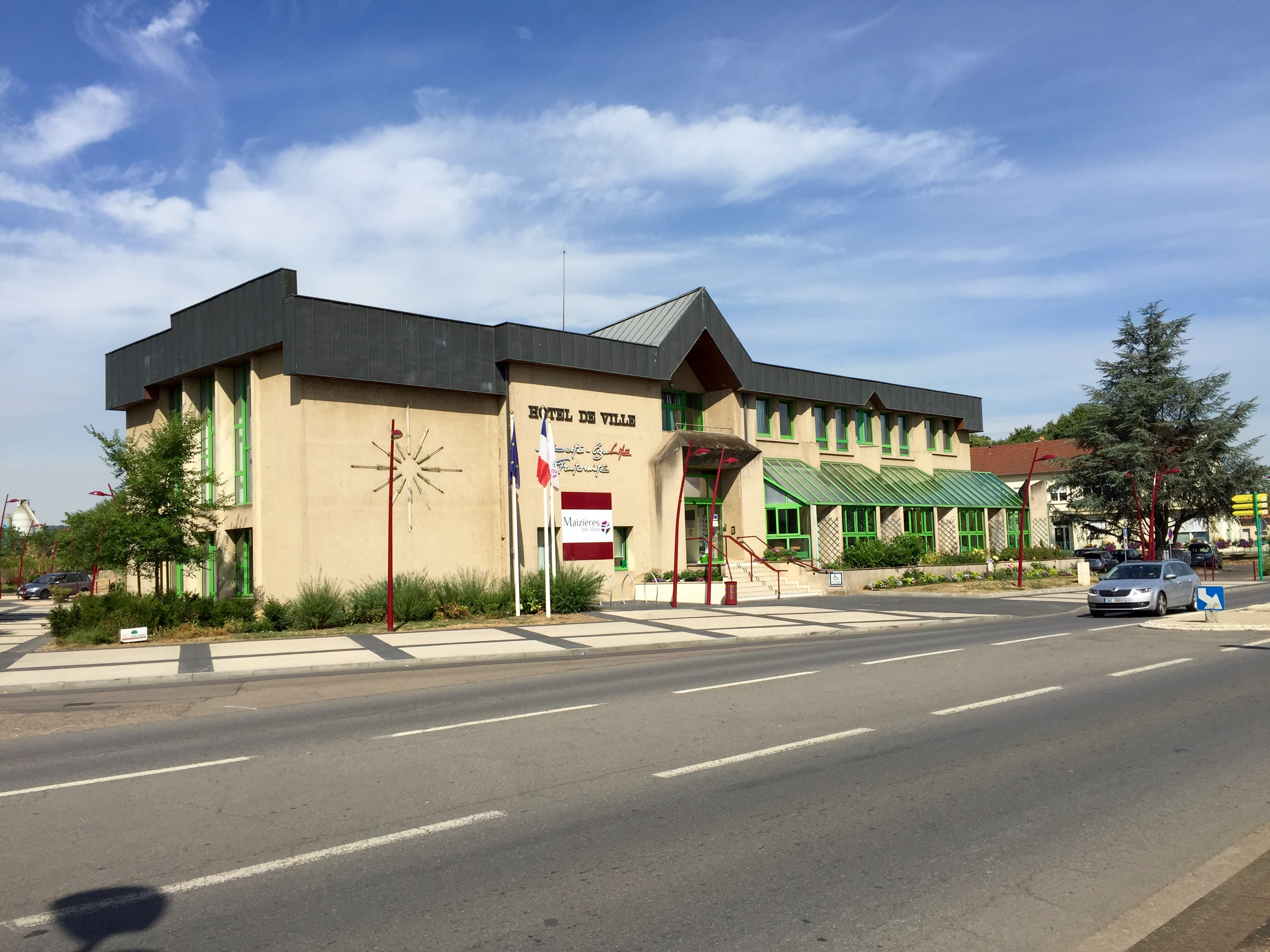
- The town hall in Maizières-lès-Metz

- Coat of arms
- Location of Maizières-lès-Metz
- Location within France Location within Grand Est
- Coordinates: 49°12′45″N 6°09′42″E
- Country: France
- Region: Grand Est
- Department: Moselle
- Arrondissement: Metz
- Canton: Le Sillon Mosellan
- Intercommunality: CC Rives de Moselle

Government
  - Mayor (2020–2026): Julien Freyburger
- Area^{1}: 8.92 km^{2} (3.44 sq mi)
- Elevation: 164 m (538 ft)
- Highest elevation: 206 m (676 ft)
- Lowest elevation: 159 m (522 ft)
- Population (2023): 11,580
  - Density: 1,300/km^{2} (3,360/sq mi)
- Time zone: UTC+01:00 (CET)
  - Summer (DST): UTC+02:00 (CEST)
- INSEE/Postal code: 57433 /57280
- ^{1} French Land Register data, which excludes lakes, ponds, glaciers > 1 km^{2} (0.386 sq mi or 247 acres) and river estuaries.

Maizières-lès-Metz (French pronunciation: [mɛzjɛʁ lɛ mɛs], literally Maizières near Metz; Lorrain: Mach'ire) is a commune in the Moselle department, Grand Est, northeastern France.

Anciently part of the Duchy of Lorraine, Maizières was within the Holy Roman Empire until 1766, when Lorraine was annexed by France. From 1871 to 1918, as part of Alsace-Lorraine, Maizières belonged to the German Empire as Maizières-bei-Metz. Between 1915 and 1918 the town's name was briefly Germanized to Macheren. During the German occupation from 1940 to 1944 it was known as Machern-bei-Metz.

The amusement park Walygator is located in Maizières-les-Metz.

The town gives its name to the now German Maizière family which, being Huguenots, had to emigrate from the Duchy of Lorraine to Prussia in the 17th century. Preserving the name of their town up to the present, prominent members of the family include Lothar de Maizière, last Prime Minister of the German Democratic Republic, the politician Thomas de Maizière and the general Ulrich de Maizière.

== Population ==
Historical population
Year	Pop.	±% p.a.
1968	9,834	—
1975	11,024	+1.65%
1982	9,790	−1.68%
1990	8,901	−1.18%
1999	9,344	+0.54%
2007	10,237	+1.15%
2012	10,862	+1.19%
2017	11,388	+0.95%
2023	11,580	+0.28%
Source: INSEE

== International relations ==
Maizières-lès-Metz is twinned with Bukowsko, Poland, Nowotaniec, Poland and Montastruc-la-Conseillère, France.

== See also ==
- Communes of the Moselle department
