= Blank Office =

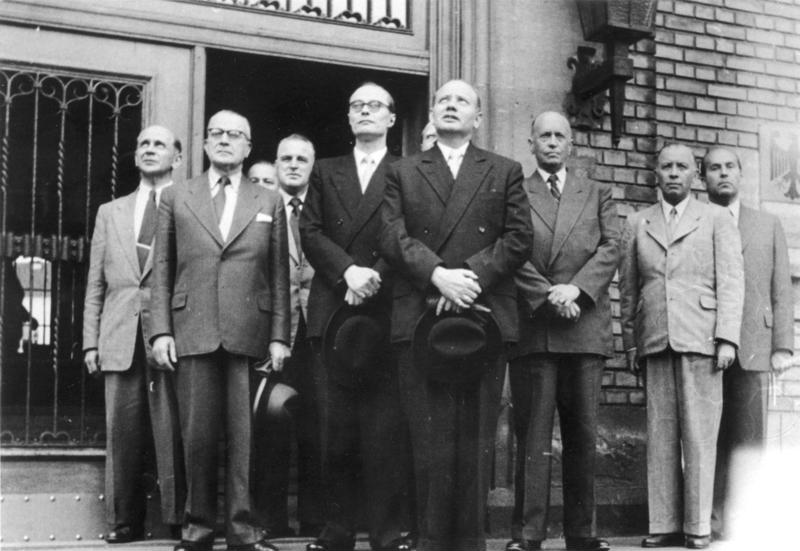
Employees of the Blank office in front of the Ermekeil barracks. Front from left to right: Gerhard Loosch, Ernst Wirmer, Theodor Blank, Wolfgang Holtz and Adolf Heusinger.

The so-called Blank Office (German: Amt Blank) was the predecessor institution of the Ministry of Defence of West Germany from October 1950 to June 1955. The official name was the Office of the Federal Chancellor's Plenipotentiary for Matters Related to the Increase of Allied Troops. The initial head of the office was Theodor Blank, who was Federal Minister of Defense from 1955 to 1956. The office building was initially located in a temporary building at the Museum Koenig Bonn, then in the Ermekeil Barracks in Bonn.

== Duties ==
From May to October 1950, Gerhard Graf von Schwerin had already advised Chancellor Konrad Adenauer on security policy issues and made preparations for the establishment of a future Ministry of Defense. For this purpose, the Schwerin Office was set up with the code name Central Homeland Service (ZfH) (not to be confused with the Federal Central Homeland Service). The ZfH was affiliated with the Friedrich-Wilhelm-Heinz-Dienst (FWHD). Adenauer dismissed Schwerin in October 1950 after he had spoken to representatives of the press about his activities. Theodor Blank then became his successor on October 26, 1950, at the same time the office was officially founded and Schwerin's office, the ZfH, was taken over.

Important employees in the Blank Office were Wolf von Baudissin, his representative Heinz Karst, the generals Adolf Heusinger, Hans Speidel and the mastermind of a civilian Bundeswehr administration Ernst Wirmer. The work of the Blank Office, which served to prepare for rearmament, contradicted the Allies' regulations that Germany should remain demilitarized in the long term; however, it was known to the Western Allies and tolerated by them.

For naval issues, the office initially relied primarily on the Naval Historical Team, a group of former high-ranking German naval officers who worked in Bremerhaven on the conception of a future German naval force, controlled and financed by the US Office of Naval Intelligence. In this way, in 1951 Wolfgang Kähler and Karl-Adolf Zenker became the most important naval planners of the Blank Office and the German delegation members for this topic in the negotiations on the European Defense Community.

== Work ==
The Blank Office investigated, among other things, camouflage patterns, combat, and dress uniforms for the Bundeswehr, ultimately deciding on a slightly modified version of the Splittertarn pattern, which had already been introduced in the Reichswehr in 1931. In connection with the European Defence Community (EDC), planned since 1952 and intended to include several European states, experiments were also conducted with a slightly modified version of the SS "Leibermuster," a Flecktarn camouflage pattern developed by 1945. These patterns and fabrics were manufactured in Belgium. After France unexpectedly rejected the largely ratified EDC plans at the last moment, the further distribution of EDC uniforms to the newly established Bundeswehr was discontinued in 1956.

Overall, the Bundeswehr's equipment still retained many elements of the Prussian-German army tradition. Theodor Blank was also responsible for introducing military vehicles such as the DKW Munga.

Initially, the office consisted of 20 employees and grew to approximately 700 by 1953.

The Blank Office also largely financed the Society for Military Science. A cooperative division of labor was established.

== Literature ==
- Dieter Krüger: Das Amt Blank. Die schwierige Gründung des Bundesministeriums für Verteidigung. Rombach, Freiburg 1993, ISBN 3-7930-0198-9 (Einzelschriften zur Militärgeschichte 38).
- Montecue J. Lowry: The forge of West German rearmament. Theodor Blank and the „Amt Blank“. Lang, New York NY u. a. 1990, ISBN 0-8204-1157-4, (American university studies Series 9: History 83).
- Militärgeschichtliches Forschungsamt (Hrsg.): Anfänge westdeutscher Sicherheitspolitik. 1945–1956. 4 Bände. Oldenbourg, München 1982–1997 (zuletzt als Nachdruck, ebenda 2001, ISBN 3-486-50882-2).
- Matthias Molt: Von der Wehrmacht zur Bundeswehr. Personelle Kontinuität und Diskontinuität beim Aufbau der deutschen Streitkräfte 1955–1966. Dissertation (Universität Heidelberg) 2007, online (pdf, 8 MB).
