= Barbara Benkstein =

German politician (born 1982)

Member of the Bundestag
- In office 2021–2025

Personal details
- Born: 4 November 1982 (age 43) Dresden, East Germany
- Party: AfD

Barbara Benkstein (née Lenk; born 4 October 1982) is a German politician for the AfD. She was a member of the Bundestag from 2021 to 2025.

== Life and politics ==
Benkstein was born in 1982 in the East German city of Dresden.

From 2009 to 2012 she worked as a librarian in the library of the Nuremberg University of Music. From 2012 to 2015 she studied library and information management in Stuttgart (MA). From 2015 to 2020 she headed the library of the Dresden University of Fine Arts.

She was elected directly to the Bundestag in 2021. In December 2024, Benkstein announced that she isn't seeking re-election for Bundestag.
