= General (Germany) =

Highest rank of German Army and Air Force

General General
- Army and Air Force insignia
- Country: Germany
- Service branch: German Army; German Air Force
- Rank group: General officer
- Rank: Four-star
- NATO rank code: OF-9
- Pay grade: B10
- Formation: 1956 (modern)
- Next lower rank: Generalleutnant
- Equivalent ranks: Admiral

General (German pronunciation: [ɡenəˈʁaːl]) is the highest rank of the German Army and German Air Force. As a four-star rank it is the equivalent to the rank of admiral in the German Navy.

The rank is rated OF-9 in NATO. It is grade B10 in the pay rules of the Federal Ministry of Defence.

== Rank insignia ==
On the shoulder straps (Heer, Luftwaffe) there are four golden pips (stars) in golden oak leaves.

Heer	Luftwaffe	Gorget patches
General (field suit) General (retired)	General (flecktarn) General (field suit)	Gorget patch (right) Gorget patch (left)

Bundeswehr sequence of ranks

junior rank: Generalleutnant	(German officer rank); General	senior rank: no higher rank

== Early history ==
By the 16th century, with the rise of standing armies, the German states had begun to appoint generals from the nobility to lead armies in battle.

A standard rank system was developed during the Thirty Years War, with the highest rank of General usually reserved for the ruling sovereign (e.g. the Kaiser or Elector) and the actual field commander holding the rank of Generalleutnant. Feldmarschall was a lower rank at that time, as was Generalwachtmeister.

By the 17th and 18th centuries, the rank of general was present in all the militaries of the German states, and saw its greatest usage by the militaries of Bavaria and Prussia. It was these two militaries that created the concept of the “general staff”, which was often manned entirely by members of the nobility. To be a general often implied membership in the noble class.

== 19th century ==
During the Napoleonic Wars, the ranks of German generals were established in four grades, beginning with Generalmajor, followed by Generalleutnant, General and Generalfeldmarschall. The standard uniforms and insignia, used for over a century, also developed during this period. The title of General included the officer's branch of service, leading to the titles of General der Infanterie ("general of the infantry"), General der Kavallerie ("general of the cavalry") and General der Artillerie ("general of the artillery").

In 1854, Prussia introduced the rank of Generaloberst (lit. General Superior, supreme general, usually (mis)translated colonel-general) so that officers could be promoted further than General without becoming a Generalfeldmarschall, as this rank was usually bestowed only for extraordinary achievements during wartime service. Later, another special grade known as Generaloberst im Range eines Generalfeldmarschalls (supreme general in the rank of a field marshal) was first used in Bavaria to denote supreme generals who were given the authority of field marshals without the actual rank.

During the German Empire, the insignia of German generals was established as a heavy golden shoulder board with up to four pips (stars) denoting seniority as a general. The rank of Generalfeldmarschall displayed a crossed set of marshal's batons on the shoulder board. German generals also began wearing golden ornaments (Arabeske) on their collars, in contrast to the collar bars (Doppellitzen) worn by elite units, or the plain colored collars of the rest of the German military forces.

The grade of "supreme general in the rank of a field marshal" (Generaloberst im Range eines Generalfeldmarschalls) was introduced in the Prussian/Imperial army in 1871. It was bestowed on senior generals usually holding the appointment of an army inspector and therefore army commanders designate in the case of hostilities. The shoulder board rank was crossed batons with three pips. The rank of supreme general proper (with three pips only) was created in 1901. In the Prussian army, the rank of field marshal could be awarded only to active officers in wartime if they had won a battle or stormed a fortress. In times of peace, the rank was awarded as an honorary rank to friendly princes and as Charakter (honorary) to generals of merit when they retired — "general with the honorary rank of field marshal" (General mit dem Charakter eines Generalfeldmarschall) - which was cancelled in 1911. At the same time, the rank insignia for supreme general with the rank of field marshal was changed to four pips without batons.

== World War II ==
The German rank of General saw its widest usage during World War II. Due to the massive expansion of the German armed forces (Wehrmacht), a new “wave” of generals was promoted in the 1930s that would lead Germany into war.

Equivalent NATO code	OF-10	OF-9	OF-8	OF-7	OF-6
German Army
Luftwaffe
	Generalfeldmarschall	Generaloberst	General of the branch	Generalleutnant	Generalmajor
Waffen-SS	No equivalent
Waffen-SS	No equivalent	SS-Oberst-Gruppenführer and Generaloberst of the Waffen-SS	SS-Obergruppenführer and General of the Waffen-SS	SS-Gruppenführer and Lieutenant general of the Waffen-SS	SS-Brigadeführer and Major general of the Waffen-SS

=== Generalfeldmarschall ===
In 1936, Hitler revived the rank of field marshal.

=== Generaloberst (Colonel general / Supreme general) ===
The rank of Generaloberst is usually translated as "colonel general", but perhaps a better translation would be "supreme general". A Generaloberst was usually an army commander.

=== General of the branch (Full general) ===
In WW2 the German three-star rank General of the branch (de: General der Waffengattung, or short General) was formally linked to the branch of the army Heer, or air force Luftwaffe, in which the officer served, and (nominally) commanded: in addition to the long established General der Kavallerie, General der Artillerie and General der Infanterie, the Wehrmacht also had General der Panzertruppen (armoured troops), General der Gebirgstruppen (mountain troops), General der Pioniere (engineers), General der Fallschirmtruppen (parachute troops), General der Flieger (aviators), General der Flakartillerie (anti-aircraft), General der Nachrichtentruppen (communications troops) and General der Luftnachrichtentruppen (air communications troops). A General of the branch was usually a corps commander.

=== Generalleutnant ===
The German Generalleutnant was usually a senior division commander.

=== Generalmajor ===
The German Generalmajor was usually a junior division commander

The staff corps of the Wehrmacht, medical, veterinary, judicial and chaplain, used special designations for their general officers, with Generalarzt, Generalveterinär, Generalrichter and Feldbischof being the equivalent of Generalmajor; Generalstabsarzt, Generalstabsveterinär and Generalstabsrichter the equivalent of Generalleutnant; and (the unique) Generaloberstabsarzt, Generaloberstabsveterinär and Generaloberstabsrichter the equivalent of General.

With the formation of the Luftwaffe, air force generals began to use the same general ranks as the German army. The shoulder insignia was identical to that used by the army, with the addition of special collar patches worn by Luftwaffe general officers. The supreme rank of Reichsmarschall (Reich Marshal) was created in 1940 for Hermann Göring.

=== Waffen-SS ===
In 1941, the Waffen-SS began using general ranks in addition to standard SS ranks. An Oberst-Gruppenführer of the Waffen-SS, for example, would be titled Oberst-Gruppenführer und Generaloberst der Waffen-SS. The Ordnungspolizei (Orpo) also used similar police ranks. The Waffen-SS had no field marshals, but the rank of Reichsführer-SS held by Heinrich Himmler was considered to be the equivalent of a field marshal (Generalfeldmarschall) during the war years.

The senior colonel rank of SS-Oberführer has sometimes been considered to be a brigadier general equivalent; however, this is incorrect. The rank (in particular among the Waffen-SS) was not considered equivalent to a general officer, was not entitled to the grey lampasses and lapel facings of a general, and wore the shoulderboards of an army full-colonel or Oberst.

== Modern usage ==
In the Bundeswehr, the rank of Brigadegeneral was inserted below the rank of Generalmajor. While the rank titles of Generalmajor, Generalleutnant and General were retained, each of those titles now denotes a higher rank than before (e.g. the Generalleutnant is now a three-star general).

Prior to the reunification of Germany, general officer rank designations in the German Democratic Republic were based on the Soviet model. Generalmajor was still the lowest general officer grade, followed by Generalleutnant, Generaloberst (now three stars instead of four) and Armeegeneral. In 1982, the GDR government established the rank of Marschall der DDR, although no one was ever promoted to this rank.

== See also ==
- Comparative military ranks of World War I
- Comparative military ranks of World War II
