= Konrad Adenauer =

Chancellor of West Germany from 1949 to 1963

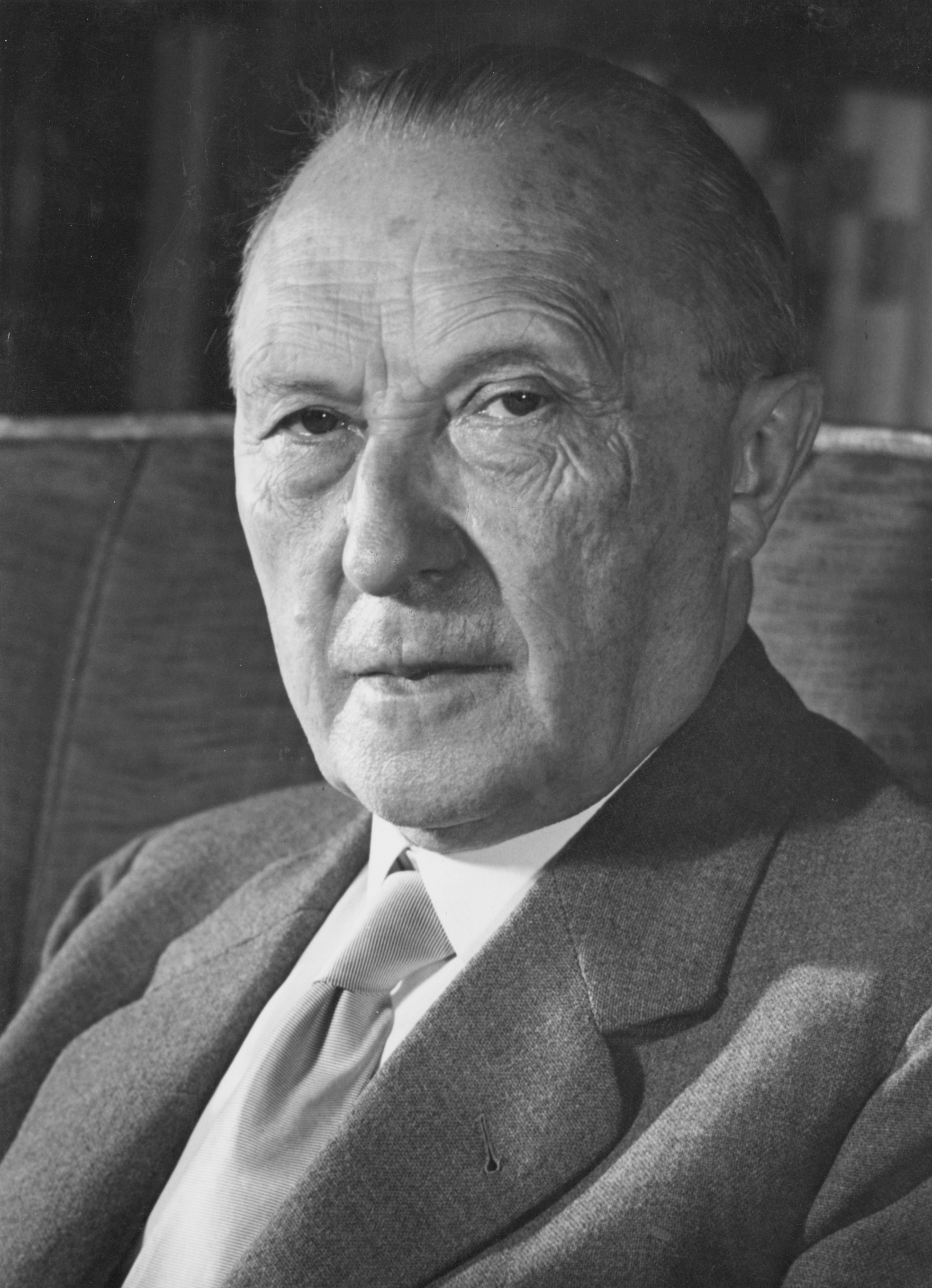
- Formal portrait, 1953

Chancellor of Germany (Note: Due to the division of Germany, Konrad Adenauer was not an all-German chancellor, despite his legal title. The term West Germany is the common English name for the Federal Republic of Germany in the period between its formation on 23 May 1949 and the German reunification through the accession of East Germany on 3 October 1990.)
- In office 15 September 1949 – 16 October 1963
- President: Theodor Heuss; Heinrich Lübke
- Vice-Chancellor: Franz Blücher; Ludwig Erhard
- Preceded by: Office re-established
- Succeeded by: Ludwig Erhard

Minister for Foreign Affairs
- In office 15 March 1951 – 6 June 1955
- Chancellor: Himself
- Preceded by: Office established
- Succeeded by: Heinrich von Brentano

Leader of the Christian Democratic Union
- In office 1 March 1946 – 23 March 1966
- Bundestag Leader: Heinrich von Brentano; Heinrich Krone; Rainer Barzel
- Preceded by: Office established
- Succeeded by: Ludwig Erhard

President of the Parliamentary Council
- In office 1 September 1948 – 23 May 1949
- Preceded by: Office established
- Succeeded by: Office abolished

Lord Mayor of Cologne
- In office 4 May 1945 – 6 October 1945
- Preceded by: Willi Suth
- Succeeded by: Willi Suth
- In office 13 October 1917 – 13 March 1933
- Preceded by: Max Wallraf
- Succeeded by: Günter Riesen

President of the Prussian State Council
- In office 7 May 1921 – 26 April 1933
- Preceded by: Office established
- Succeeded by: Robert Ley
Parliamentary constituencies
Member of the Bundestag for Bonn (Bonn-Stadt und -Land; 1949–1965)
In office 7 September 1949 – 19 April 1967
Preceded by	Constituency established
Succeeded by	Alo Hauser
Member of the Landtag of North Rhine-Westphalia for Siegkries South
In office 26 September 1946 – 17 June 1950
Preceded by	Constituency established
Succeeded by	Kurt Cornelius

Personal details
- Born: Konrad Hermann Joseph Adenauer; 5 January 1876 Cologne, Rhenish Prussia
- Died: 19 April 1967 (aged 91) Rhöndorf, West Germany
- Resting place: Waldfriedhof, Rhöndorf, Bad Honnef
- Party: Centre (1906–1933); Christian Democratic Union (1945–1967)
- Spouse: Emma Weyer (m. 1904; died 1916) Auguste Zinsser (m. 1919; died 1948)
- Children: 8
- Education: University of Freiburg; Ludwig-Maximilians-Universität München; University of Bonn
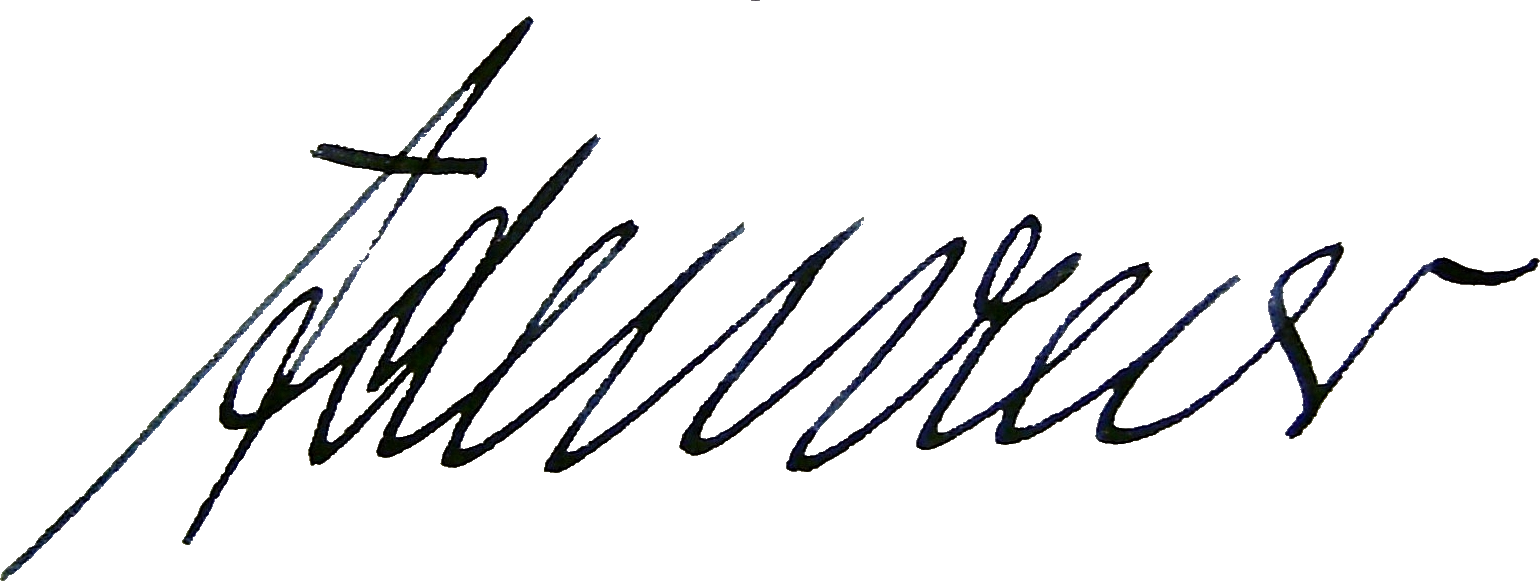
- Signature

Konrad Hermann Joseph Adenauer (Note: /ˈædənaʊər, ˈɑːd-/ A(H)D-ən-our; German: [ˈkɔnʁaːt ˈhɛʁman ˈjoːzɛf ˈʔaːdənaʊɐ].) (5 January 1876 – 19 April 1967) was a German statesman and politician who served as the first chancellor of West Germany from 1949 to 1963. From 1946 to 1966, he was the first leader of the Christian Democratic Union (CDU), a newly founded Christian democratic party, which became the dominant force in the country under his leadership. Adenauer is considered one of the founding fathers of the European Union.

As a devout Catholic, Adenauer was a leading politician of the Catholic Centre Party in the Weimar Republic, serving as Mayor of Cologne (1917–1933) and as president of the Prussian State Council. In the early years of the Federal Republic, he switched focus from denazification to recovery, and led his country to close relations with France, the United Kingdom and the United States. During his years in power, he worked to restore the West German economy from the destruction of World War II to a central position in Europe with a market-based economy, liberal democracy, stability, international respect, and economic prosperity.

Adenauer belied his age by his intense work habits and his uncanny political instinct. A strong anti-communist, he was deeply committed to an Atlanticist foreign policy and restoring the position of Germany on the world stage. Adenauer was a driving force in reestablishing national military forces (the Bundeswehr) and intelligence services (the Bundesnachrichtendienst) in West Germany in 1955 and 1956. He refused the diplomatic recognition of East Germany and the Oder–Neisse line as a postwar frontier to Poland. Under Adenauer, West Germany joined NATO. A proponent of European unity, he signed the Treaty of Rome in 1957.

== Cologne years ==
=== Early life and education ===
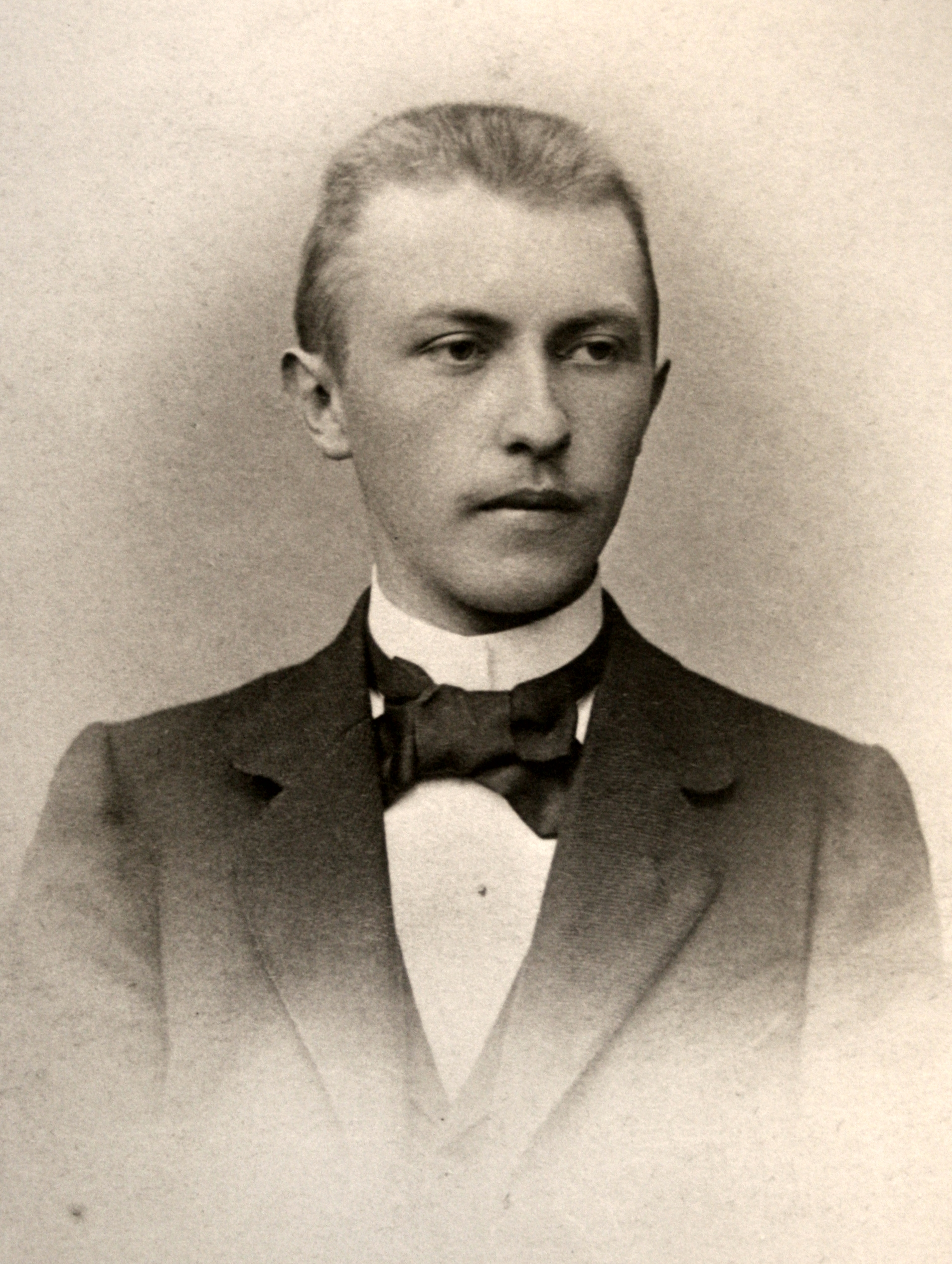
Adenauer in 1896

Konrad Adenauer was born on 5 January 1876 in Cologne, Rhenish Prussia, as the third of five children of Johann Konrad Adenauer (1833–1906) and his wife Helene (née Scharfenberg; 1849–1919). His siblings were August (1872–1952), Johannes (1873–1937), Lilli (1879–1950) and Elisabeth, who died shortly after birth c. 1880. One of the formative influences of Adenauer's youth was the so-called Kulturkampf, the struggle of the Prussian state with the Catholic church, an experience that as related to him by his parents left him with a lifelong dislike for "Prussianism", and led him like many other Catholic Rhinelanders of the 19th century to deeply resent the Rhineland's inclusion in Prussia.

Having a passion for inventing, Adenauer started experimenting with plants in the back garden as a child, which was not welcomed by his father who told him "One should not try to meddle with the Lord's hand", then in 1904 he invented a reaction steam engine which was supposed to filter out dust produced by cars. However, as his hobby of inventing grew ever more costly, Adenauer's activities in this area slowly diminished.

After final school examination (Abitur) in 1894, Adenauer studied law and politics at the University of Freiburg, the Ludwig-Maximilians-Universität München, and the University of Bonn, demonstrating competent but not exceptional academic ability. In 1896, he was mustered for the Prussian army, but did not pass the physical exam due to chronic respiratory problems he had experienced since childhood. He was a member of several Catholic students' associations. He graduated in 1900, and afterwards worked as a lawyer at the court in Cologne for four years.

=== Leader in Cologne ===
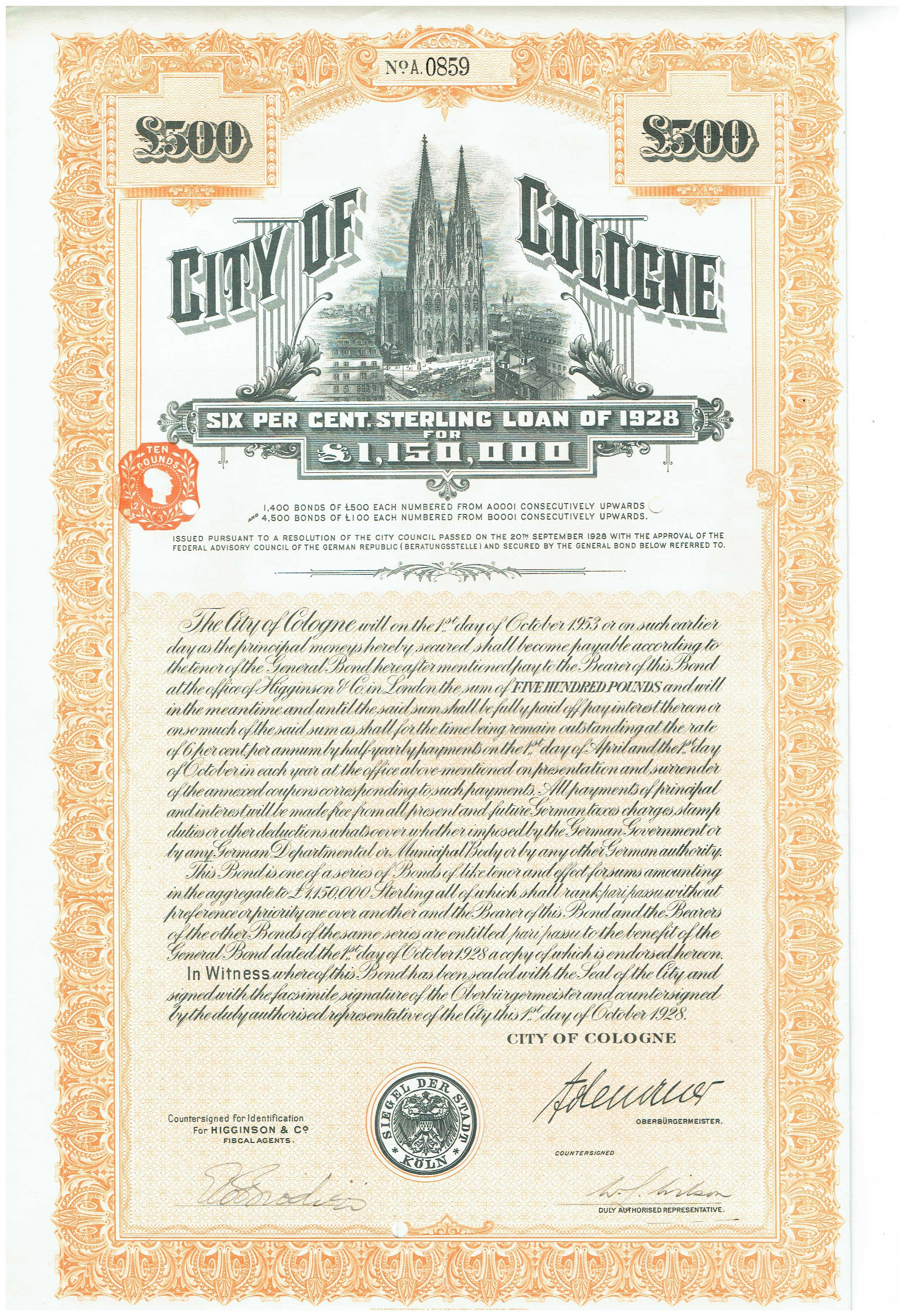
Bond of the City of Cologne, issued 1 October 1928; Facsimile signature of Adenauer

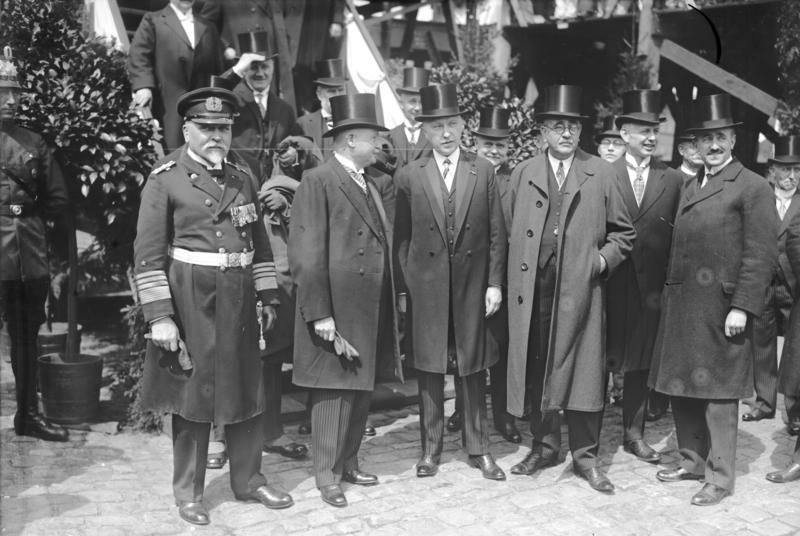
In Wilhelmshaven in 1928, when a new cruiser was given the name of Köln (Cologne), home city of Adenauer (centre, with left hand visible, next to him Lieutenant-General Wilhelm Groener and Gustav Noske)

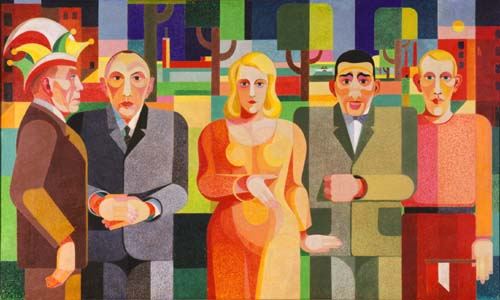
Heinrich Hoerle: Zeitgenossen (contemporaries). A 1931 modernist painting with mayor Adenauer (in grey) together with artists and a boxer.

As a devout Catholic, he joined the Centre Party (German: Deutsche Zentrumspartei or just Zentrum) in 1906 and was elected to Cologne's city government, in the same year. In 1909, he became Vice-Mayor of Cologne when his wife's cousin became the Mayor, an industrial metropolis with a population of 635,000 in 1914. Avoiding the extreme political movements that attracted so many of his generation, Adenauer was committed to bourgeois decency, diligence, order, and Christian morals and values, and was dedicated to rooting out disorder, inefficiency, irrationality, and political immorality. He did not fight in the First World War as he was in poor health, and was severely injured in a car crash in the summer of 1917. In 1917, he was unanimously elected as Mayor of Cologne for a 12-year period, and re-elected in 1929. By 1931 and whilst Mayor of Cologne, he was also acting Vice President of the German Colonial Society from 1931 to 1933 and said: "The German Empire must strive for the acquisition of colonies. There is too little room in the Empire itself for its large population."

As Mayor of Cologne, he was one of Germany's most influential municipal politicians along with Otto Gessler, Hans Luther, and Karl Jarres. He rebuilt the University of Cologne, he masterminded the construction of a bridge across the Rhine and an electrical plant, and he played a major role in the planning of a stadium and a city park in the city. During World War I, he worked closely with the army to maximize the city's role as a rear base of supply and transportation for the Western Front. He paid special attention to the civilian food supply, enabling the residents to avoid the worst of the severe shortages that beset most German cities during 1918–1919. In 1918, he invented a soy-based sausage called the Cologne sausage to help feed the city. In the face of the collapse of the old regime and the threat of revolution and widespread disorder in late 1918, Adenauer maintained control in Cologne using his good working relationship with the Social Democrats. In a speech on 1 February 1919 Adenauer called for the dissolution of Prussia, and for the Prussian Rhineland to become a new autonomous Land ('state') in the Reich. Adenauer claimed this was the only way to prevent France from annexing the Rhineland. Both the Reich and Prussian governments were completely against Adenauer's plans for breaking up Prussia. When the terms of the Treaty of Versailles were presented to Germany in June 1919, Adenauer again suggested to Berlin his plan for an autonomous Rhineland state and again his plans were rejected by the Reich government.

He established a good working relationship with the postwar British military authorities, using them to neutralize the workers' and soldiers' council that had become an alternative base of power for the city's left wing. During the Weimar Republic, he was president of the Prussian State Council from 1921 to 1933, which was the representation of the provinces of Prussia in its legislature.

A major debate had occurred within his Centre Party since 1906 regarding the question of whether it should "leave the tower" (i.e., allow Protestants to join, becoming a multi-faith party) or "stay in the tower" (i.e., continue to be a Catholic-only party). Adenauer was one of the leading advocates of "leaving the tower", which led to a dramatic clash at the 1922 Katholikentag, the annual meeting of German Catholics under the presidency of Adenauer. Cardinal Michael von Faulhaber publicly admonished Adenauer for wanting to take the Zentrum "out of the tower".

In mid-October 1923, the Chancellor Gustav Stresemann announced that Berlin would cease all financial payments to the Rhineland and that the new currency Rentenmark, which had replaced the now worthless Mark, would not circulate in the Rhineland. To save the Rhineland economy, Adenauer opened talks with the French High Commissioner Paul Tirard in late October 1923 for a Rhenish republic in a sort of economic union with France which would achieve Franco-German reconciliation, which Adenauer called a "grand design". At the same time, Adenauer clung to the hope that the Rentenmark might still circulate in the Rhineland. Adenauer's plans came to naught when Stresemann, who was resolutely opposed to Adenauer's "grand design", which he viewed as borderline treason, was able to negotiate an end to the crisis on his own.

In 1921, he was suggested as a possible candidate for Chancellor, but his insistence on a majority government prevented this from happening. In 1926, the Zentrum suggested Adenauer becoming Chancellor, an offer that he was interested in but ultimately rejected when the German People's Party insisted that one of the conditions for entering into a coalition under Adenauer's leadership was that Gustav Stresemann stay on as Foreign Minister. Adenauer, who disliked Stresemann as "too Prussian," rejected that condition.

=== Years under Nazi Germany ===
When the Nazi Party won several municipal, state and national elections in between 1930 and 1932, Adenauer, a strong opponent of Adolf Hitler and the Nazis, still believed that improvements in the national economy would make his strategy work: ignore the Nazis and concentrate on the Communist threat. He thought that based on election returns, the Nazis should become part of the Prussian and Reich governments, even when he was already the target of intense personal attacks. Political maneuverings around the ageing President Paul Von Hindenburg then brought the Nazis to power on 30 January 1933.

By early February, Adenauer realized the futility of all discussions and any attempts at compromise with the Nazis. Cologne's city council and the Prussian parliament had been dissolved; on 4 April 1933, he was officially dismissed as mayor and his bank accounts were frozen. "He had no money, no home and no job." After arranging for the safety of his family, he appealed to the abbot of the Benedictine monastery at Maria Laach for a stay of several months. According to Albert Speer in his book Spandau: The Secret Diaries, Hitler expressed admiration for Adenauer, noting his civic projects, the building of a road circling the city as a bypass, and a "green belt" of parks. However, both Hitler and Speer concluded that Adenauer's political views and principles made it impossible for him to play any role in Nazi Germany.

Adenauer was imprisoned for two days after the Night of the Long Knives on 30 June 1934; however, on 10 August 1934, maneuvering for his pension, he wrote a ten-page letter to Hermann Göring, the Prussian interior minister. He stated that as mayor he had violated Prussian laws in order to allow Nazi events in public buildings and Nazi flags to be flown from city flagpoles, and that in 1932 he had declared publicly that the Nazis should join the Reich government in a leading role. At the end of 1932, Adenauer had indeed demanded a joint government by his Zentrum party and the Nazis for Prussia.

During the next two years, Adenauer changed residences often for fear of reprisals against him, while living on the benevolence of friends. With the help of lawyers in August 1937, he was successful in claiming a pension. He received a cash settlement for his house, which had been taken over by the city of Cologne; his unpaid mortgage, penalties and taxes were waived. With reasonable financial security, he managed to live in seclusion for some years. After the failed assassination attempt on Hitler of July 1944, he was imprisoned for a second time as an opponent of the regime. He fell ill and credited Eugen Zander, a former municipal worker in Cologne and a communist, with saving his life. Zander, then a section kapo of a labor camp near Bonn, discovered Adenauer's name on a deportation list to the east and managed to get him admitted to a hospital. Adenauer was subsequently rearrested (as was his wife), but was released from prison at Brauweiler in November 1944.

=== After World War II and the founding of the CDU ===
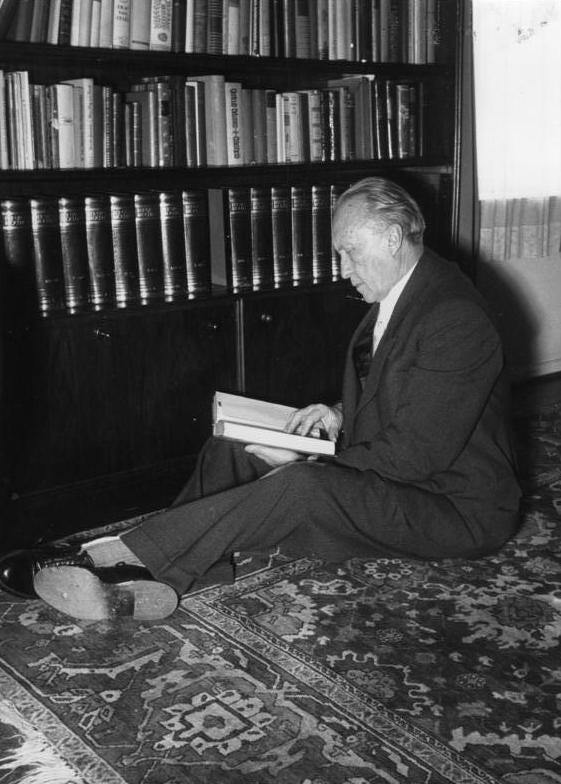
Adenauer in 1951, reading in his house in Rhöndorf he had built in 1937. It is now a museum.

Prohibited from returning to Cologne, Adenauer settled in Rhöndorf hoping to survive the war in peace. While the American army did not avoid the town during the Allied invasion of Germany, it again installed him as Mayor of Cologne, secretly for the first two months because of his sons in the German army. The city had been heavily bombed. After the city was transferred into the British zone of occupation, however, the Director of its military government, General Gerald Templer, dismissed Adenauer for incompetence in December 1945. Adenauer considered the Germans the political equals of the occupying Allies, which angered Templer. Adenauer's dismissal by the British contributed much to his subsequent political success and allowed him to pursue a policy of alliance with the occupying Allies in the 1950s without facing charges of being a "sell-out".

After being dismissed, Adenauer devoted himself to building a new political party, the Christian Democratic Union (CDU), which he hoped would embrace both Protestants and Catholics in a single party. According to Adenauer, a Catholic-only party would lead to German politics being dominated by anti-democratic parties yet again. In January 1946, Adenauer initiated a political meeting of the future CDU in the British zone in his role as doyen (the oldest man in attendance, Alterspräsident) and was informally confirmed as its leader. During the Weimar Republic, Adenauer had often been considered a future Chancellor and after 1945, his claims for leadership were even stronger. The other surviving Zentrum leaders were considered unsuitable for the tasks that lay ahead.

Reflecting his background as a Catholic Rhinelander who had long chafed under Prussian rule, Adenauer believed that Prussianism was the root cause of National Socialism, and that only by driving out Prussianism could Germany become a democracy. In a December 1946 letter, Adenauer wrote that the Prussian state in the early 19th century had become an "almost God-like entity" that valued state power over the rights of individuals. Adenauer's dislike of Prussia even led him to oppose Berlin as a future capital.

Adenauer viewed the most important battle in the postwar world as between the forces of Christianity and Marxism, especially Communism. Marxism meant both the Communists and the Social Democrats, as the latter were officially a Marxist party until the Bad Godesberg conference of 1959. The same anti-Marxist viewpoints led Adenauer to denounce the Social Democrats as the heirs to Prussianism and National Socialism. Adenauer's ideology was at odds with parts of the CDU, who wished to unite socialism and Christianity. Adenauer worked diligently at building up contacts and support in the CDU over the following years, and he sought with varying success to impose his particular ideology on the party.

Adenauer's leading role in the CDU of the British zone won him a position at the Parliamentary Council of 1948, which had been called into existence by the Western Allies to draft a constitution for the three western zones of Germany. He was the chairman of this constitutional convention and vaulted from this position to being chosen as the first head of government once the new "Basic Law" had been promulgated in May 1949.

== Chancellor of West Germany (1949–1963) ==
=== First government ===
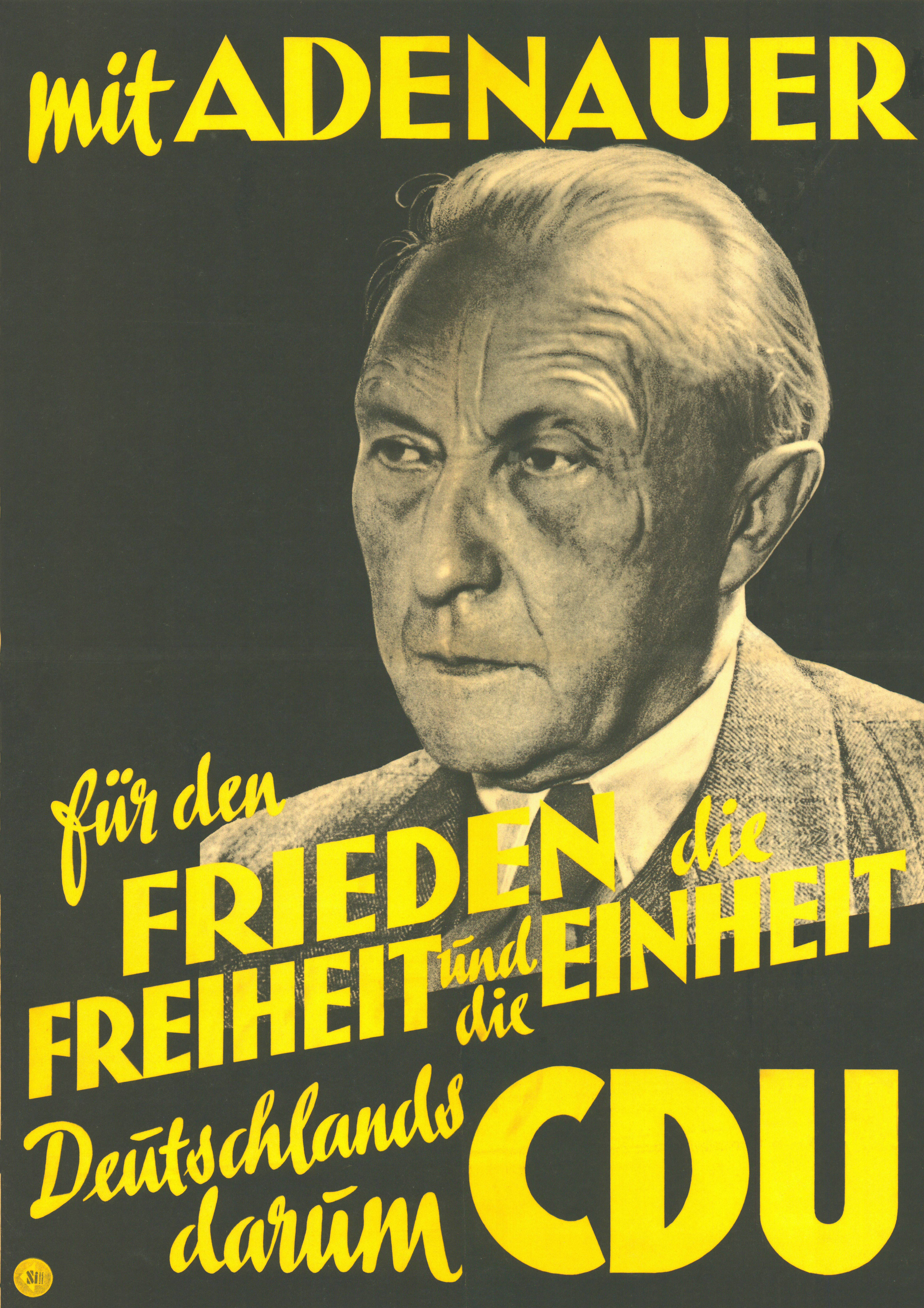
Election poster, 1949: "With Adenauer for peace, freedom and unity of Germany, therefore CDU"

The first election to the Bundestag of West Germany was held on 15 August 1949, with the Christian Democrats emerging as the strongest party. There were two clashing visions of a future Germany held by Adenauer and his main rival, the Social Democrat Kurt Schumacher. Adenauer favored integrating the Federal Republic with other Western states, especially France and the United States in order to fight the Cold War, even if the price of this was the continued division of Germany. Schumacher by contrast, though an anti-communist, wanted to see a united, socialist and neutral Germany. As such, Adenauer was in favor of joining NATO, something that Schumacher strongly opposed.

The Free Democrat Theodor Heuss was elected the first President of the Republic, and Adenauer was elected Chancellor (head of government) on 15 September 1949 with the support of his own CDU, the Christian Social Union, the liberal Free Democratic Party, and the right-wing German Party. It was said that Adenauer was elected Chancellor by the new German parliament by "a majority of one vote – his own". At age 73, it was thought that Adenauer would only be a caretaker Chancellor. However, he would go on to hold this post for 14 years, a period spanning most of the preliminary phase of the Cold War. During this period, the post-war division of Germany was consolidated with the establishment of two separate German states, the Federal Republic of Germany (West Germany) and the German Democratic Republic (East Germany).

In the controversial selection for a "provisional capital" of the Federal Republic of Germany, Adenauer championed Bonn over Frankfurt am Main. The British had agreed to detach Bonn from their zone of occupation and convert the area to an autonomous region wholly under German sovereignty; the Americans were not prepared to grant the same for Frankfurt. He also resisted the claims of Heidelberg, which had better communications and had survived the war in better condition; partly because the Nazis had been popular there before they came to power and partly, as he said, because the world would not take them seriously if they set up their state in a city that was the setting for The Student Prince, at the time a popular American operetta based on the drinking culture of German student fraternities.

As chancellor, Adenauer tended to make most major decisions himself, treating his ministers as mere extensions of his authority. While this tendency decreased under his successors, it established the image of West Germany (and later reunified Germany) as a "chancellor democracy".

==== Ending denazification ====
In a speech on 20 September 1949, Adenauer denounced the entire denazification process pursued by the Allied military governments, announcing in the same speech that he was planning to bring in an amnesty law for the Nazi war criminals and he planned to apply to "the High Commissioners for a corresponding amnesty for punishments imposed by the Allied military courts". Adenauer argued the continuation of denazification would "foster a growing and extreme nationalism" as the millions who supported the Nazi regime would find themselves excluded from German life forever. He also demanded an "end to this sniffing out of Nazis." By 31 January 1951, the amnesty legislation had benefited 792,176 people. They included 3,000 functionaries of the SA, the SS, and the Nazi Party who participated in dragging victims to jails and camps; 20,000 Nazis sentenced for "deeds against life" (presumably murder); 30,000 sentenced for causing bodily injury, and about 5,200 charged with "crimes and misdemeanors in office″.

==== Opposition to the Oder–Neisse Line ====
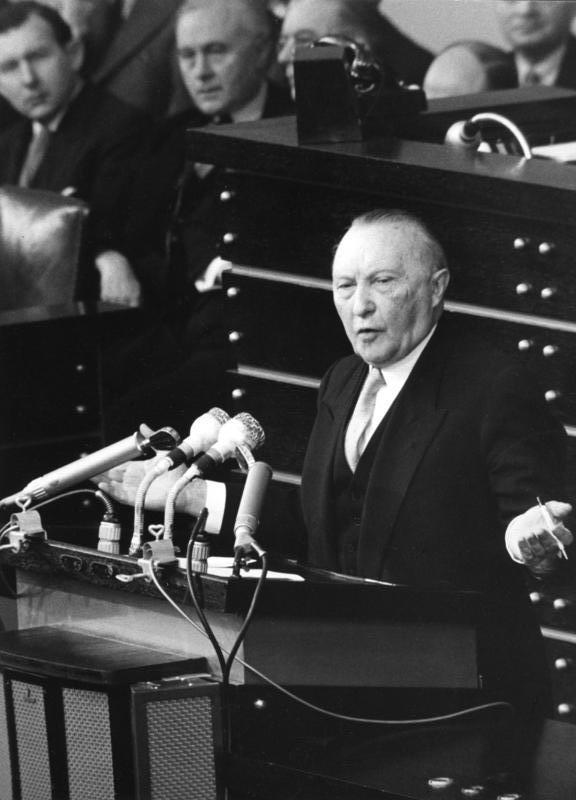
Adenauer speaking in the Bundestag, 1955

The Adenauer government refused to accept the Oder–Neisse line as Germany's eastern frontier. This refusal was in large part motivated by his desire to win the votes of expellees and right-wing nationalists to the CDU, which is why he supported Heimatrecht, i.e., the right of expellees to return to their former homes. It was also intended to be a deal-breaker if negotiations ever began to reunite Germany on terms that Adenauer considered unfavorable such as the neutralisation of Germany as Adenauer knew well that the Soviets would never revise the Oder–Neisse line. Privately, Adenauer considered Germany's eastern provinces to be lost forever.

==== Advocacy for European Coal and Steel Community ====
At the Petersberg Agreement in November 1949, he achieved some of the first concessions granted by the Allies, such as a decrease in the number of factories to be dismantled, but in particular his agreement to join the International Authority for the Ruhr led to heavy criticism. In the following debate in parliament Adenauer stated:

The Allies have told me that dismantling would be stopped only if I satisfy the Allied desire for security, does the Socialist Party want dismantling to go on to the bitter end?

The opposition leader Kurt Schumacher responded by labelling Adenauer "Chancellor of the Allies", accusing Adenauer of putting good relations with the West for the sake of the Cold War ahead of German national interests.

After a year of negotiations, the Treaty of Paris was signed on 18 April 1951, establishing the European Coal and Steel Community. The treaty was unpopular in Germany, where it was seen as a French attempt to take over German industry. The treaty conditions were favorable to the French, but for Adenauer, the only thing that mattered was European integration. Adenauer was keen to see Britain join the European Coal and Steel Community as he believed the more free-market British would counterbalance the influence of the more dirigiste French, and to achieve that purpose he visited London in November 1951 to meet with Prime Minister Winston Churchill. Churchill said Britain would not join the European Coal and Steel Community because doing so would mean sacrificing relations with the U.S. and Commonwealth.

==== German rearmament ====
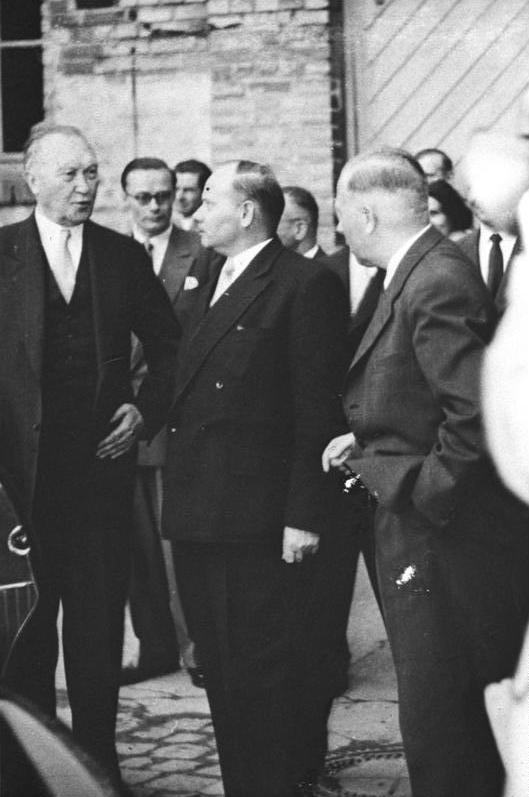
Adenauer in 1950 at the Ermekeil barracks in Bonn with Adolf Heusinger (right), one of the authors of the Himmerod memorandum

From the beginning of his chancellorship, Adenauer had been pressing for German rearmament. After the outbreak of the Korean War on 25 June 1950, the U.S. and Britain agreed that West Germany had to be rearmed to strengthen the defenses of Western Europe against a possible Soviet invasion. Further contributing to the crisis atmosphere of 1950 was the bellicose rhetoric of the East German leader Walter Ulbricht, who proclaimed the reunification of Germany under communist rule to be imminent. To soothe French fears of German rearmament, the French Premier René Pleven suggested the so-called Pleven plan in October 1950 under which the Federal Republic would have its military forces function as part of the armed wing of the multinational European Defense Community (EDC). Adenauer deeply disliked the Pleven plan, but was forced to support it when it became clear that this plan was the only way the French would agree to German rearmament.

==== Amnesty and employment of Nazis ====
In 1950, a major controversy broke out when it emerged that Adenauer's State Secretary Hans Globke had played a major role in drafting anti-semitic Nuremberg Race Laws in Nazi Germany. Adenauer kept Globke on as State Secretary as part of his strategy of integration. Starting in August 1950, Adenauer began to pressure the Western Allies to free all of the war criminals in their custody, especially those from the Wehrmacht, whose continued imprisonment he claimed made West German rearmament impossible. Adenauer had been opposed to the Nuremberg Trials in 1945–1946, and after becoming Chancellor, he demanded the release of the so-called Spandau Seven, as the seven war criminals convicted at Nuremberg and imprisoned at Spandau Prison were known.

In October 1950, Adenauer received the so-called Himmerod memorandum drafted by four former Wehrmacht generals at the Himmerod Abbey that linked freedom for German war criminals as the price of German rearmament, along with public statements from the Allies that the Wehrmacht committed no war crimes in World War II. The Allies were willing to do whatever was necessary to get the much-needed German rearmament underway, and in January 1951, General Dwight Eisenhower, commander of NATO forces, issued a statement which declared the great majority of the Wehrmacht had acted honorably.

On 2 January 1951, Adenauer met with the American High Commissioner, John J. McCloy, to argue that executing the Landsberg prisoners would ruin forever any effort at having the Federal Republic play its role in the Cold War. At the time, American occupation authorities had 28 Nazi war criminals left on death row in their custody. In response to Adenauer's demands and pressure from the German public, McCloy and Thomas T. Handy on 31 January 1951 reduced the death sentences of all but the seven worst offenders.

By 1951, laws were passed by the Bundestag ending denazification. Denazification was viewed by the United States as counterproductive and ineffective, and its demise was not opposed. Adenauer's intention was to switch government policy to reparations and compensation for the victims of Nazi rule (Wiedergutmachung).

Officials were allowed to retake jobs in civil service, with the exception of people assigned to Group I (Major Offenders) and II (Offenders) during the denazification review process. Adenauer pressured his rehabilitated ex-Nazis by threatening that stepping out of line could trigger the reopening of individual de-nazification prosecutions. The construction of a "competent Federal Government effectively from a standing start was one of the greatest of Adenauer's formidable achievements".

Contemporary critics accused Adenauer of cementing the division of Germany, sacrificing reunification and the recovery of territories lost in the westward shift of Poland and the Soviet Union with his determination to secure the Federal Republic to the West. Adenauer's German policy was based upon Politik der Stärke ('Policy of Strength'), and upon the so-called magnet theory, in which a prosperous, democratic West Germany integrated with the west would act as a "magnet" that would eventually bring down the East German regime.

==== Rejecting the reunification offer ====
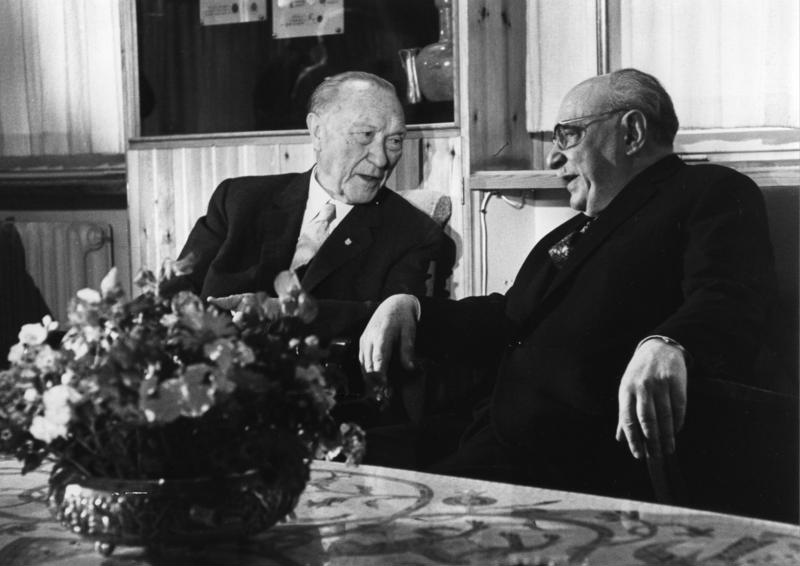
Adenauer with Israeli President Zalman Shazar, 1966

In 1952, the Stalin Note, as it became known, "caught everybody in the West by surprise". It offered to unify the two German entities into a single, neutral state with its own, non-aligned national army to effect superpower disengagement from Central Europe. Adenauer and his cabinet were unanimous in their rejection of the Stalin overture; they shared the Western Allies' suspicion about the genuineness of that offer and supported the Allies in their cautious replies. Adenauer's flat rejection was, however, still out of step with public opinion; he then realized his mistake and he started to ask questions. Critics denounced him for having missed an opportunity for German reunification. The Soviets sent a second note, courteous in tone. Adenauer by then understood that "all opportunity for initiative had passed out of his hands," and the matter was put to rest by the Allies. Given the realities of the Cold War, German reunification and recovery of lost territories in the east were not realistic goals as both of Stalin's notes specified the retention of the existing "Potsdam"-decreed boundaries of Germany.

==== Reparation to victims of Nazi Germany ====
Under Adenauer ways to make compensations for the Holocaust were sought for example through supporting the newly-created Israel. West Germany started negotiations with Israel for restitution of lost property and the payment of damages to victims of Nazi persecution. In the Luxemburger Abkommen, West Germany agreed to pay compensation to Israel. Jewish claims were bundled in the Jewish Claims Conference, which represented the Jewish victims of Nazi Germany. West Germany then initially paid about DM 3 billion (equivalent to €8.08 billion in 2021) to Israel and about DM 450 million (equivalent to €1.21 billion in 2021) to the Claims Conference, although payments continued after that, as new claims were made. In the face of severe opposition both from the public and from his own cabinet, Adenauer was only able to get the reparations agreement ratified by the Bundestag with the support of the SPD. Israeli public opinion was divided over accepting the money, but ultimately the fledgling state under David Ben-Gurion agreed to take it, opposed by political parties such as Herut, who were against such treaties.

==== Assassination attempt ====
On 27 March 1952, a package addressed to Chancellor Adenauer exploded in the Munich Police Headquarters, killing one Bavarian police officer, Karl Reichert. Investigations revealed the mastermind behind the assassination attempt to be Menachem Begin, who would later become the Prime Minister of Israel. Begin had been the commander of Irgun and at that time headed Herut and was a member of the Knesset. His goal was to put pressure on the German government and prevent the signing of the Reparations Agreement between Israel and West Germany, which he vehemently opposed.

=== Second government ===
==== Interior affairs ====
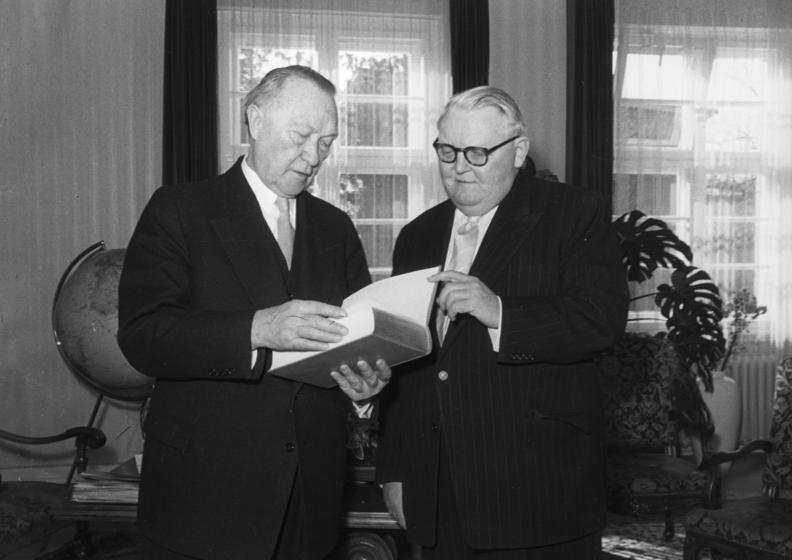
Konrad Adenauer with minister of economics Ludwig Erhard, 1956

When the East German uprising of 1953 was harshly suppressed by the Red Army in June 1953, Adenauer took political advantage of the situation and was handily re-elected to a second term as Chancellor. The CDU/CSU came up one seat short of an outright majority. Adenauer could thus have governed in a coalition with only one other party, but retained/gained the support of nearly all of the parties in the Bundestag that were to the right of the SPD.

The German Restitution Laws (Bundesentschädigungsgesetz) were passed in 1953, which allowed some victims of Nazi persecution to claim restitution. Under the 1953 restitution law, those who had suffered for "racial, religious or political reasons" could collect compensation, which were defined in such a way as to sharply limit the number of people entitled to collect compensation.

In November 1954, Adenauer's lobbying efforts on behalf of the Spandau Seven finally bore fruit with the release of Konstantin von Neurath. Adenauer congratulated von Neurath on his release, sparking controversy all over the world. At the same time, Adenauer's efforts to win freedom for Admiral Karl Dönitz ran into staunch opposition from the British Permanent Secretary at the Foreign Office, Ivone Kirkpatrick, who argued Dönitz would be an active danger to German democracy. Adenauer then traded with Kirkpatrick no early release for Admiral Dönitz with an early release for Admiral Erich Raeder on medical grounds.

Adenauer is closely linked to the implementation of an enhanced pension system, which ensured unparalleled prosperity for retired people. Along with his Minister for Economic Affairs and successor Ludwig Erhard, the West German model of a "social market economy" (a mixed economy with capitalism moderated by elements of social welfare and Catholic social teaching) allowed for the boom period known as the Wirtschaftswunder ("economic miracle") that produced broad prosperity, but Adenauer acted more leniently towards the trade unions and employers' associations than Erhard. The Adenauer era witnessed a dramatic rise in the standard of living of average Germans, with real wages doubling between 1950 and 1963. This rising affluence was accompanied by a 20% fall in working hours during that same period, together with a fall in the unemployment rate from 8% in 1950 to 0.4% in 1965. In addition, an advanced welfare state was established.

==== Military affairs ====
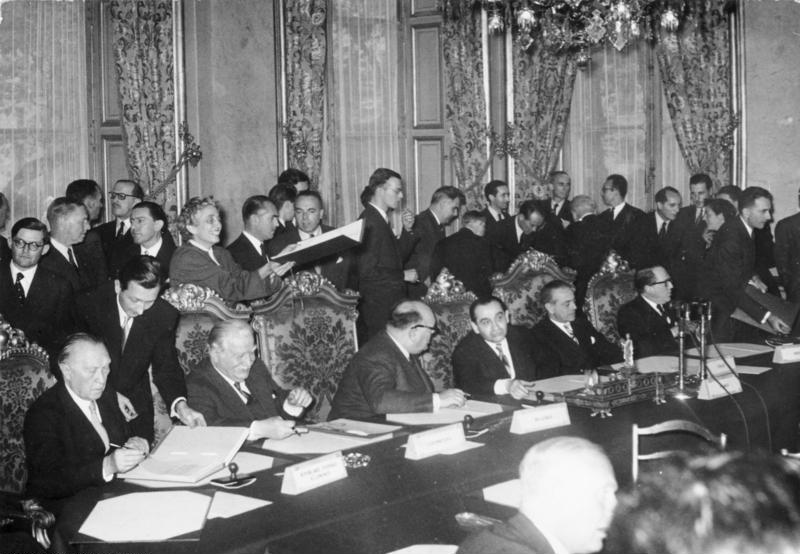
Signing the North Atlantic Treaty in Paris, 1954 (Adenauer at the left)

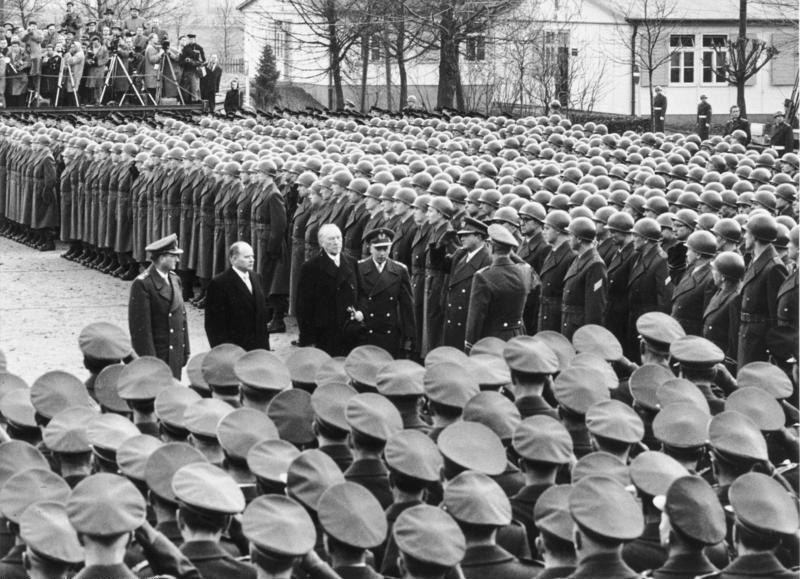
Minister Blank and Adenauer with General Speidel inspect formations of the newly created Bundeswehr on 20 January 1955.

In the spring of 1954, opposition to the Pleven plan grew within the French National Assembly, and in August 1954, it died when an alliance of conservatives and Communists in the National Assembly joined forces to reject the EDC treaty under the grounds that West German rearmament in any form was an unacceptable danger to France.

The British Prime Minister Winston Churchill told Adenauer that Britain would ensure that West German rearmament would happen, regardless if the National Assembly ratified the EDC treaty or not, and Foreign Secretary Anthony Eden used the failure of the EDC to argue for independent West German rearmament and West German NATO membership. Thanks in part to Adenauer's success in rebuilding West Germany's image, the British proposal met with considerable approval. In the ensuing London conference, Eden assisted Adenauer by promising the French that Britain would always maintain at least four divisions in the British Army of the Rhine as long as there was a Soviet threat, with the strengthened British forces also aimed implicitly against any German revanchism. Adenauer then promised that Germany would never seek to have nuclear, chemical and biological weapons as well as capital ships, strategic bombers, long-range artillery, and guided missiles, although these promises were non-binding. The French had been assuaged that West German rearmament would be no threat to France. Additionally, Adenauer promised that the West German military would be under the operational control of NATO general staff, though ultimate control would rest with the West German government, and that above all he would never violate the strictly defensive NATO charter and invade East Germany to achieve German reunification.

In May 1955, West Germany joined NATO and in November a West German military, the Bundeswehr, was founded. Though Adenauer made use of a number of former Wehrmacht generals and admirals in the Bundeswehr, he saw the Bundeswehr as a new force with no links to the past, and wanted it to be kept under civilian control at all times. To achieve these aims, Adenauer gave a great deal of power to the military reformer Wolf Graf von Baudissin.

Adenauer reached an agreement for his "nuclear ambitions" with a NATO Military Committee in December 1956 that stipulated West German forces were to be "equipped for nuclear warfare". Concluding that the United States would eventually pull out of Western Europe, Adenauer pursued nuclear cooperation with other countries. The French government then proposed that France, West Germany and Italy jointly develop and produce nuclear weapons and delivery systems, and an agreement was signed in April 1958. With the ascendancy of Charles de Gaulle, the agreement for joint production and control was shelved indefinitely. President John F. Kennedy, an ardent foe of nuclear proliferation, considered sales of such weapons moot since "in the event of war the United States would, from the outset, be prepared to defend the Federal Republic." The physicists of the Max Planck Institute for Theoretical Physics at Göttingen and other renowned universities would have had the scientific capability for in-house development, but the will was absent, nor was there public support. With Adenauer's fourth-term election in November 1961 and the end of his chancellorship in sight, his "nuclear ambitions" began to taper off.

==== Foreign policy ====
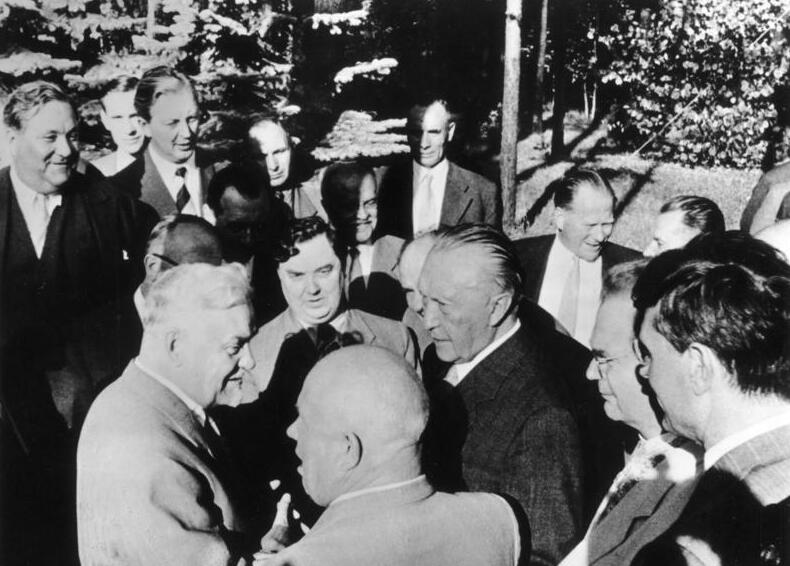
Bulganin, Malenkov, Khrushchev greeting Adenauer in Moscow in September 1955

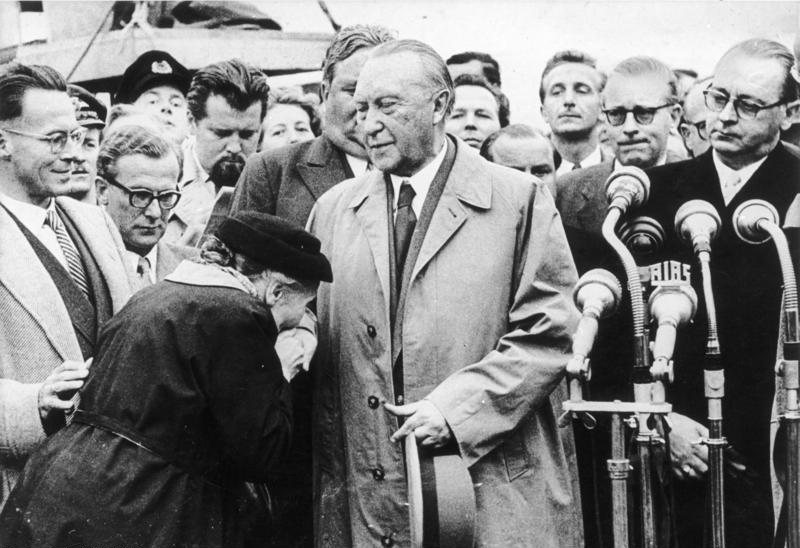
Adenauer with the mother of a German POW brought home in 1955 from the Soviet Union, due to Adenauer's visit to Moscow

In return for the release of the last German prisoners of war in 1955, the Federal Republic established diplomatic relations with the USSR, but refused to recognize East Germany and broke off diplomatic relations with countries (e.g., Yugoslavia) that established relations with the East German régime. Adenauer was also ready to consider the Oder–Neisse line as the German border in order to pursue a more flexible policy with Poland but he did not command sufficient domestic support for this, and opposition to the Oder–Neisse line continued, causing considerable disappointment among Adenauer's Western allies.

In 1956, during the Suez Crisis, Adenauer fully supported the Anglo-French-Israeli attack on Egypt, arguing to his Cabinet that Egyptian President Gamal Abdel Nasser was a pro-Soviet force that needed to be cut down to size. Adenauer was appalled that the Americans had come out against the attack on Egypt alongside the Soviets, which led Adenauer to fear that the United States and Soviet Union would "carve up the world" with no thought for European interests.

At the height of the Suez crisis, Adenauer visited Paris to meet the French Premier Guy Mollet in a show of moral support for France. The day before Adenauer arrived in Paris, the Soviet Premier Nikolai Bulganin sent the so-called "Bulganin letters" to the leaders of Britain, France and Israel threatening nuclear strikes if they did not end the war against Egypt. The news of the "Bulganin letters" reached Adenauer mid-way on the train trip to Paris. The threat of a Soviet nuclear strike that could destroy Paris at any moment added considerably to the tension of the summit. The Paris summit helped to strengthen the bond between Adenauer and the French, who saw themselves as fellow European powers living in a world dominated by Washington and Moscow.

Adenauer was deeply shocked by the Soviet threat of nuclear strikes against Britain and France, and even more so by the apparent quiescent American response to the Soviet threat of nuclear annihilation against two of NATO's key members. As a result, Adenauer became more interested in the French idea of a European "Third Force" in the Cold War as an alternative security policy. This helped to lead to the formation of the European Economic Community in 1957, which was intended to be the foundation stone of the European "Third Force".

Adenauer's achievements include the establishment of a stable democracy in West Germany and a lasting reconciliation with France, culminating in the Élysée Treaty. His political commitment to the Western powers achieved full sovereignty for West Germany, which was formally laid down in the General Treaty, although there remained Allied restrictions concerning the status of a potentially reunited Germany and the state of emergency in West Germany. Adenauer firmly integrated the country with the emerging Euro-Atlantic community (NATO and the Organisation for European Economic Cooperation).

=== Third government ===
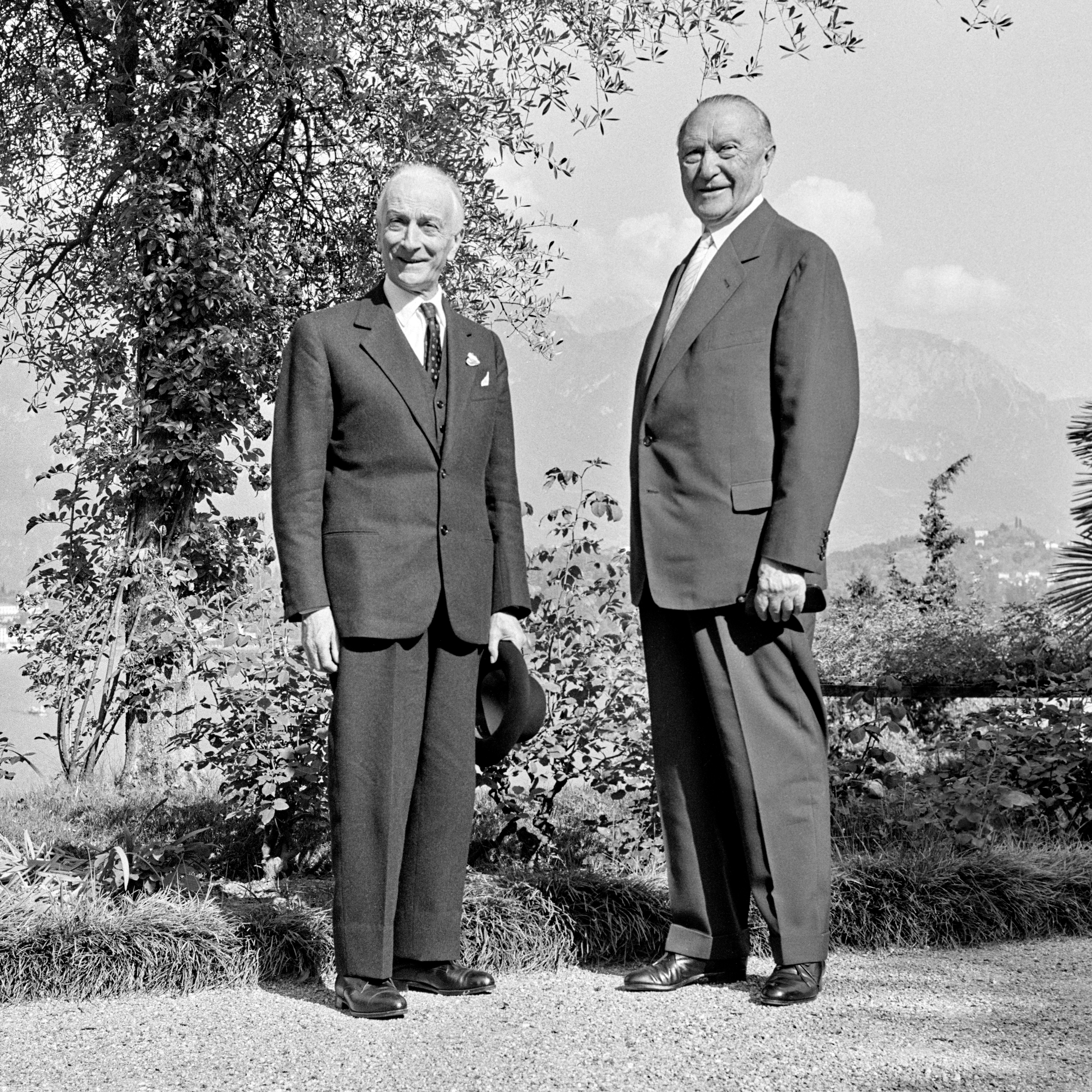
Adenauer and Italian Prime Minister Antonio Segni in August 1959

In 1957, the Saarland was reintegrated into Germany as a federal state of the Federal Republic. The election of 1957 essentially dealt with national matters. His re-election campaign centered around the slogan "Keine Experimente" ('No Experiments') in response to the democratic experimentalism reform proposed by his opponents. Riding a wave of popularity from the return of the last POWs from Soviet labor camps, as well as an extensive pension reform, Adenauer led the CDU/CSU to an outright majority, something never previously achieved in a free German election. In 1957, the Federal Republic signed the Treaty of Rome and became a founding member of the European Economic Community. In September 1958, Adenauer first met President Charles de Gaulle of France, who was to become a close friend and ally in pursuing Franco-German rapprochement. Adenauer saw de Gaulle as a "rock" and the only foreign leader whom he could completely trust.

In response to the Ulm Einsatzkommando trial in 1958, Adenauer set up the Central Office of the State Justice Administrations for the Investigation of National Socialist Crimes.

On 27 November 1958 another Berlin crisis broke out when Khrushchev submitted an ultimatum with a six-month expiry date to Washington, London and Paris, where he demanded that the Allies pull all their forces out of West Berlin and agree that West Berlin become a "free city", or else he would sign a separate peace treaty with East Germany. Adenauer was opposed to any sort of negotiations with the Soviets, arguing if only the West were to hang tough long enough, Khrushchev would back down. As the 27 May deadline approached, the crisis was defused by the British Prime Minister Harold Macmillan, who visited Moscow to meet with Khrushchev and managed to extend the deadline while not committing himself or the other Western powers to concessions. Adenauer believed Macmillan to be a spineless "appeaser", who had made a secret deal with Khrushchev at the expense of the Federal Republic.

Adenauer tarnished his image when he announced he would run for the office of federal president in 1959, only to pull out when he discovered that he did not have political backing to strengthen the office of president and change the balance of power. After his reversal, he supported the nomination of Heinrich Lübke as the CDU presidential candidate, whom he believed was weak enough not to interfere with his actions as Federal Chancellor. One of Adenauer's reasons for not pursuing the presidency was his fear that Ludwig Erhard, whom Adenauer thought little of, would become the new chancellor.

By early 1959, Adenauer came under renewed pressure from his Western allies to recognize the Oder–Neisse line, with the Americans being especially insistent. Adenauer gave his "explicit and unconditional approval" to the idea of non-aggression pacts in late January 1959, which effectively meant recognising the Oder–Neisse line, since realistically speaking, Germany could only regain the lost territories through force. After Adenauer's intention to sign non-aggression pacts with Poland and Czechoslovakia became clear, the German expellee lobby swung into action and organized protests all over the Federal Republic while bombarding the offices of Adenauer and other members of the cabinet with thousands of letters, telegrams and telephone calls promising never to vote CDU again if the non-aggression pacts were signed. Faced with this pressure, Adenauer promptly capitulated to the expellee lobby.

In late 1959, a controversy broke out when it emerged that Theodor Oberländer, the Minister of Refugees since 1953 and one of the most powerful leaders of the expellee lobby, had committed war crimes against Jews and Poles during World War II. Despite his past, on 10 December 1959, a statement was released to the press declaring that "Dr. Oberländer has the full confidence of the Adenauer cabinet". Other Christian Democrats made it clear to Adenauer that they would like to see Oberländer out of the cabinet, and finally in May 1960 Oberländer resigned.

=== Fourth government ===
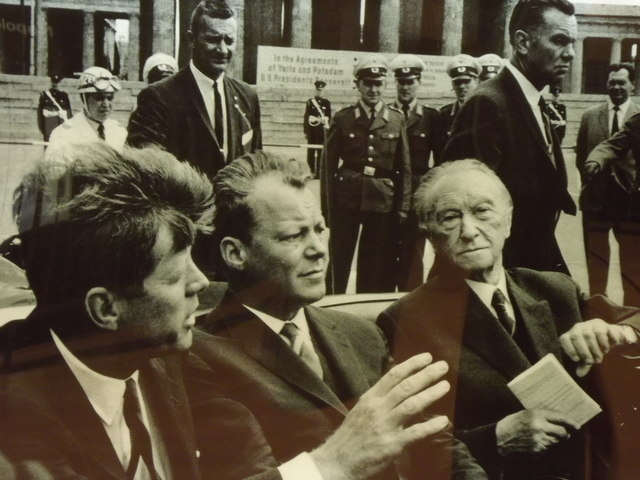
U.S. president John F. Kennedy, Willy Brandt, and Adenauer at Berlin Wall in 1963

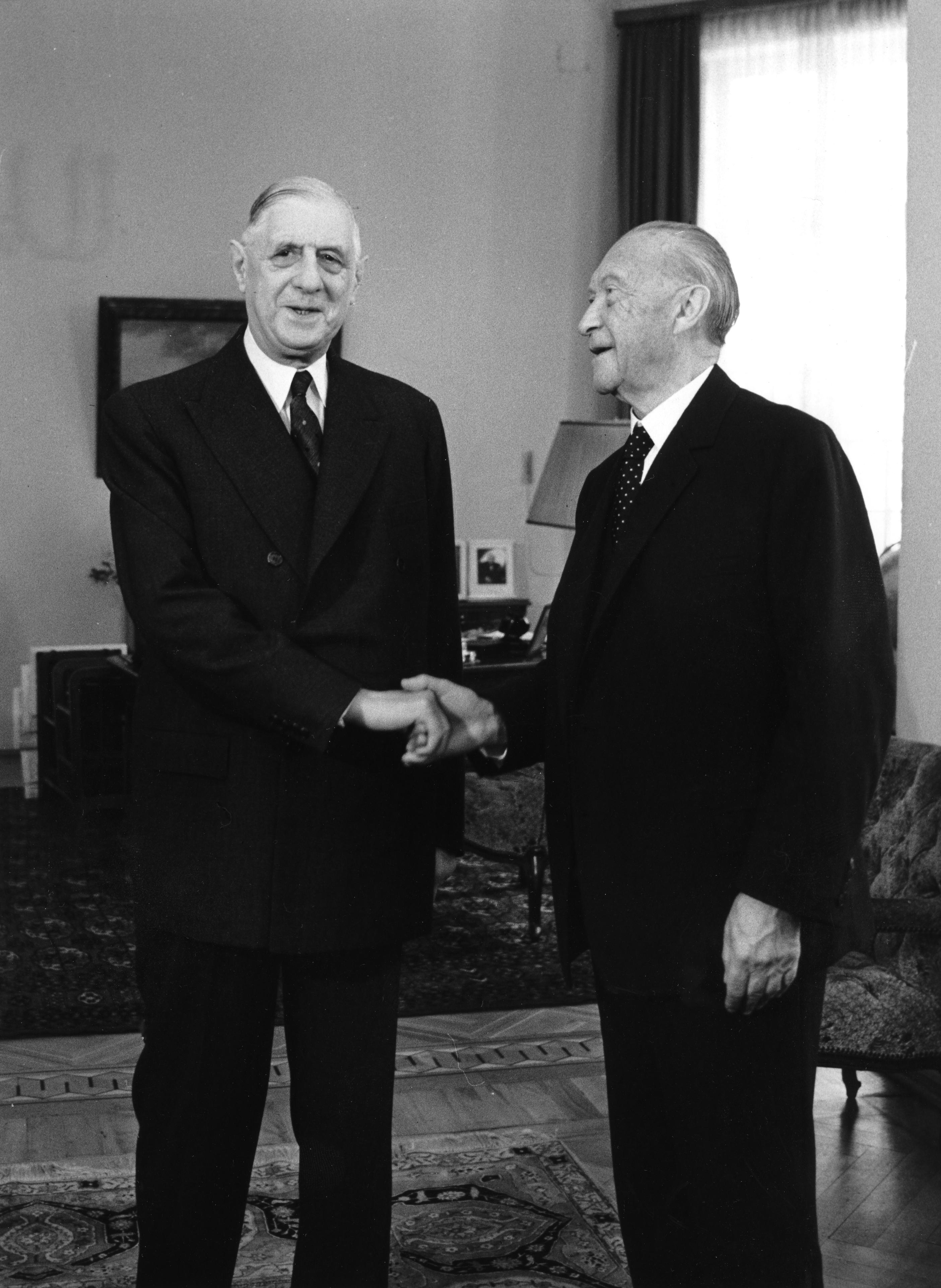
Adenauer with French president Charles de Gaulle (1963)

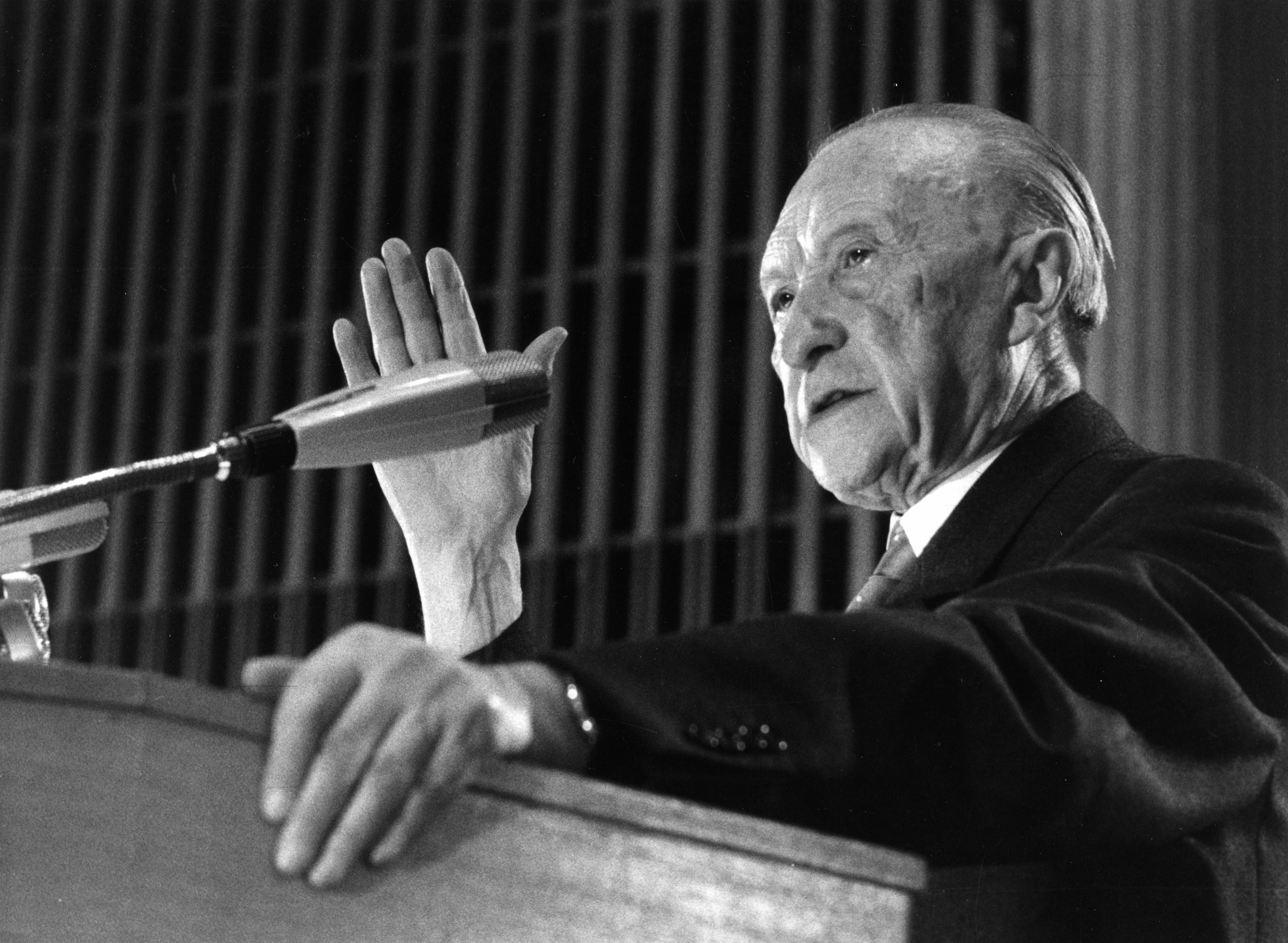
Adenauer delivering a speech at the March 1966 CDU party rally, one year before his death

In 1961, Adenauer had his concerns about both the status of Berlin and US leadership confirmed, as the Soviets and East Germans built the Berlin Wall. Adenauer had come into the year distrusting the new US president, John F. Kennedy. He doubted Kennedy's commitment to a free Berlin and a unified Germany and considered him undisciplined and naïve. For his part, Kennedy thought that Adenauer was a relic of the past. Their strained relationship impeded effective Western action on Berlin during 1961.

The construction of the Berlin Wall in August 1961 and the sealing of borders by the East Germans made Adenauer's government look weak. Adenauer continued his campaign trail and made a disastrous misjudgement in a speech on 14 August 1961 in Regensburg with a personal attack on the SPD lead candidate Willy Brandt, Lord Mayor of West Berlin, saying that Brandt's illegitimate birth had disqualified him from holding any sort of office. After failing to keep their majority in the general election on 17 September, the CDU/CSU again needed to include the FDP in a coalition government. Adenauer was forced to make two concessions: to relinquish the chancellorship before the end of the new term, his fourth, and to replace his foreign minister. In his last years in office, Adenauer used to take a nap after lunch and, when he was traveling abroad and had a public function to attend, he sometimes asked for a bed in a room close to where he was supposed to be speaking, so that he could rest briefly before he appeared.

During this time, Adenauer came into conflict with the Economics Minister Ludwig Erhard over the depth of German integration to the West. Erhard was in favor of allowing Britain to join to create a trans-Atlantic free trade zone, while Adenauer was for strengthening ties amongst the original founding six nations of West Germany, France, the Netherlands, Belgium, Luxembourg and Italy. In Adenauer's viewpoint, the Cold War meant that the NATO alliance with the United States and Britain was essential, but there could be no deeper integration into a trans-Atlantic community beyond the existing military ties as that would lead to a "mishmash" between different cultural systems that would be doomed to failure. Though Adenauer had tried to get Britain to join the European Coal and Steel Community in 1951–1952, by the early 1960s Adenauer had come to share General de Gaulle's belief that Britain simply did not belong in the EEC. The Élysée Treaty was signed in January 1963 to solidify relations with France.

In October 1962, a scandal erupted when police arrested five Der Spiegel journalists, charging them with espionage for publishing a memo detailing weaknesses in the West German armed forces. Adenauer had not initiated the arrests, but initially defended the person responsible, Defense Minister Franz Josef Strauss, and called the Spiegel memo "abyss of treason". After public outrage and heavy protests from the coalition partner FDP, he dismissed Strauss, but the reputation of Adenauer and his party had already suffered.

Adenauer managed to remain in office for almost another year, but the scandal increased the pressure already on him to fulfill his promise to resign before the end of the term. Adenauer was not on good terms in his last years of power with his economics minister Ludwig Erhard and tried to block him from the chancellorship. In January 1963, Adenauer privately supported General Charles de Gaulle's veto of Britain's attempt to join the European Economic Community, and was only prevented from saying so openly by the need to preserve unity in his cabinet, as most of his ministers, led by Erhard, supported Britain's application. A francophile, Adenauer saw a Franco-German partnership as the key for European peace and prosperity and shared de Gaulle's view that Britain would be a disputative force in the EEC. Adenauer failed in his efforts to block Erhard as his successor, and in October 1963, he turned the office over to Erhard. He remained chairman of the CDU until his resignation in December 1966.

Adenauer ensured a generally free and democratic society, and laid the groundwork for Germany to re-enter the community of nations and to evolve as a dependable member of the Western world. The British historian Frederick Taylor argued that in many ways the Adenauer era was a transition period in values and viewpoints from the authoritarianism that characterized Germany in the first half of the 20th century to the more democratic values that characterized the western half of Germany in the second half of the 20th century.

=== Social policies ===
Adenauer's years in the Chancellorship saw the realisation of a number of important initiatives in the domestic field, such as in housing, pension rights, and unemployment provision. A major housebuilding programme was launched, while measures introduced to assist war victims and expellees. A savings scheme for homeownership was set up in 1952, while the Housebuilding Act of 1956 reinforced incentives for owner-occupation. Employer-funded child allowances for three or more children were established in 1954, and in 1957, the indexation of pension schemes was introduced, together with an old age assistance scheme for agricultural workers. The 1952 Maternity Leave Law foresaw 12 weeks of paid leave for working mothers, who were also safeguarded from unfair dismissal, and improvements in unemployment benefits were carried out. The Soldiers' Law of 1956 laid down that soldiers had the same rights as other citizens, "limited only by the demands of military service." Following a Federal Act of 1961, social assistance provided a safety net of minimum income "for those not adequately catered for by social insurance." Controversially, however, a school lunch programme was abolished in 1950.

=== Intelligence services and spying ===
By the early 1960s, connections between the CDU under Adenauer and the German intelligence services (called Bundesnachrichtendienst, abbreviated to BND) had become significantly closer than would be generally known until more than 50 years later. Thanks to the BND, information on the internal machinations of the opposition SPD party were available to the entire CDU leadership, and not merely to Adenauer in his capacity as chancellor. It was Adenauer himself who personally instructed the BND to spy on his SPD rival, the future chancellor Willy Brandt.

=== Late years ===
Adenauer, who resigned as Chancellor at the age of 87 and remained head of the governing CDU until his retirement at 90, was often dubbed Der Alte ('the old one'). He also remained a member of the Bundestag for the constituency of Bonn until his death.

In May 1966, the former Chancellor made a private visit to the new state of Israel and was awarded an honorary doctorate from the Weizmann Institute. The friendship with France was particularly close to the ex-Chancellor's heart: he visited the neighbouring country three times in 1964, 1966 and 1967. On his last trip abroad in February 1967, Adenauer met with General Franco and, as the art lover he had been all his life, took advantage of the stay to visit the Prado. His last major speech in Madrid's Ateneo Palace was marked by the admonition not to let up, to continue the process of European unification. (Note: On his last trip abroad in February 1967, Adenauer met with General Franco and, as the art lover he had been all his life, took advantage of the stay to visit the Prado. His last major speech in Madrid's Ateneo Palace was marked by the admonition not to let up, to continue the process of European unification.)

As of 2021, Adenauer remains the oldest-ever European head of government and one of the oldest elected European statesmen (paralleled only by Sandro Pertini and Giorgio Napolitano); however, the governments of Tunisia and Malaysia had older heads of government during the 2010s. (Note: Beji Caid Essebsi was Tunisian president (2014–2019) from age 88 to 92, and Malaysian prime minister Mahathir Mohamad (2018–2020) was in office aged 92 to 94; Italian president Giorgio Napolitano who turned 88 in 2013 and remained in office until 2015, age 89, was merely a titular leader and did not run the government of Italy).)

== Death and legacy ==
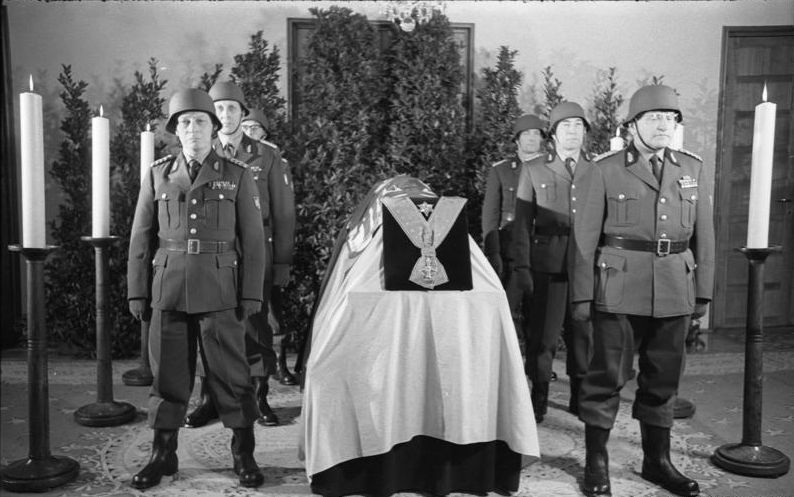
Bundesgrenzschutz personnel guarding Adenauer's coffin

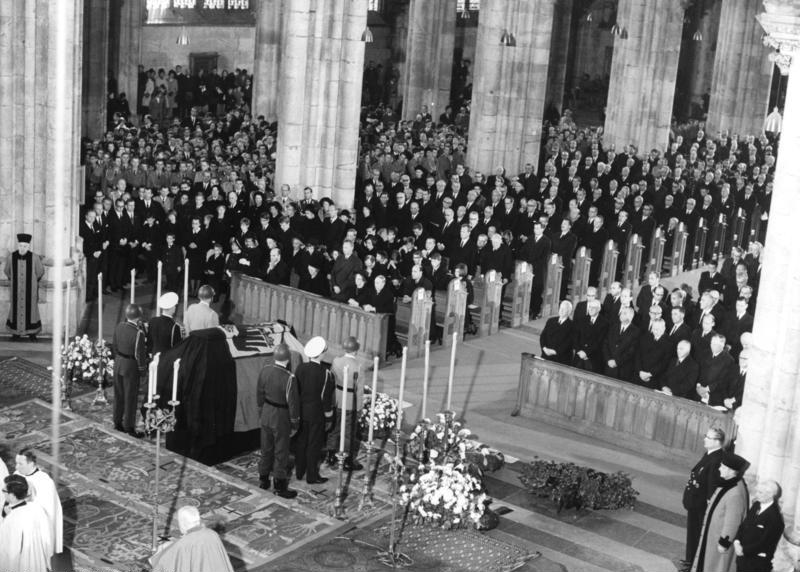
Funeral service for Adenauer in Cologne Cathedral

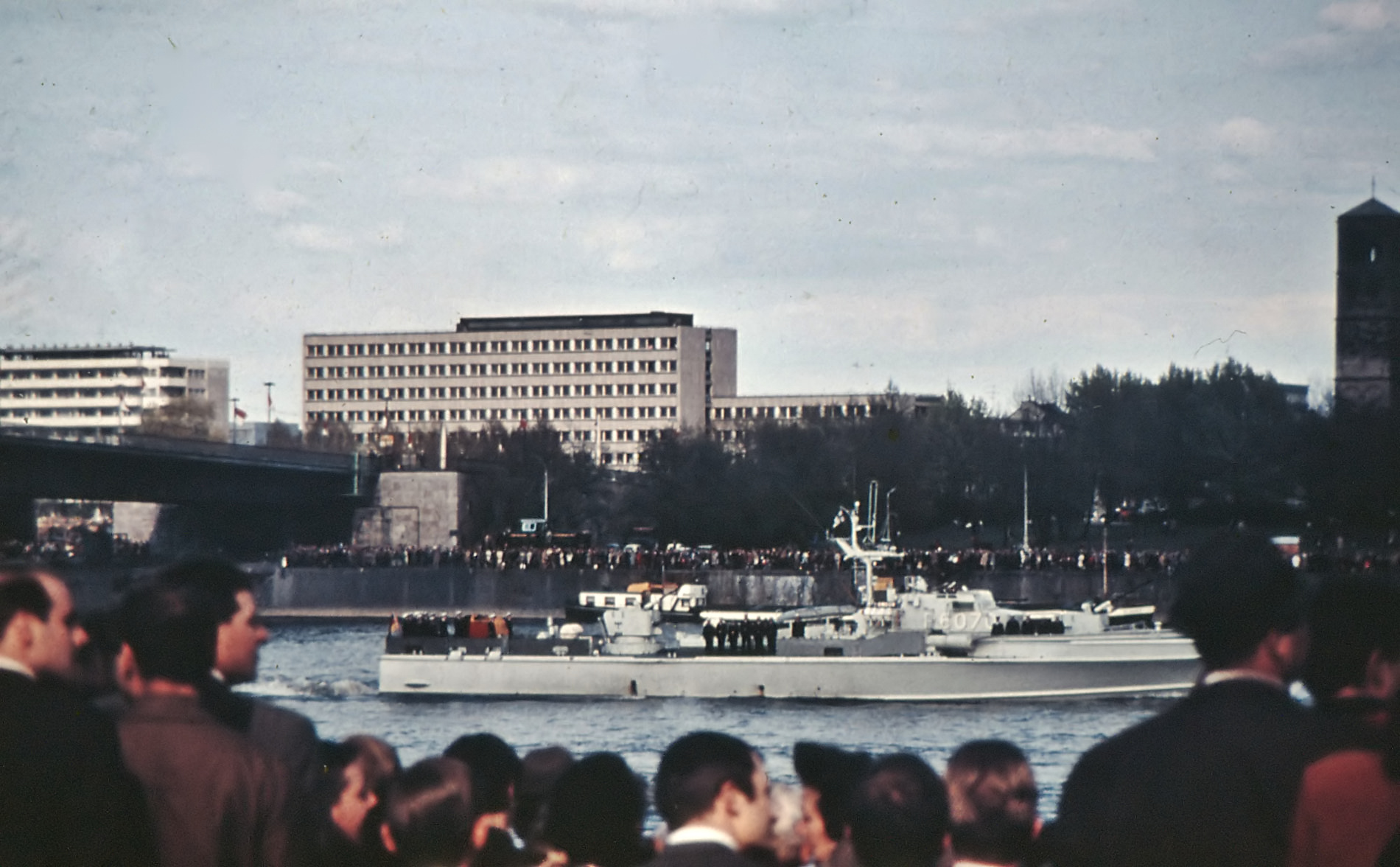
Crowds look on as Adenauer's remains are conveyed along the Rhine.

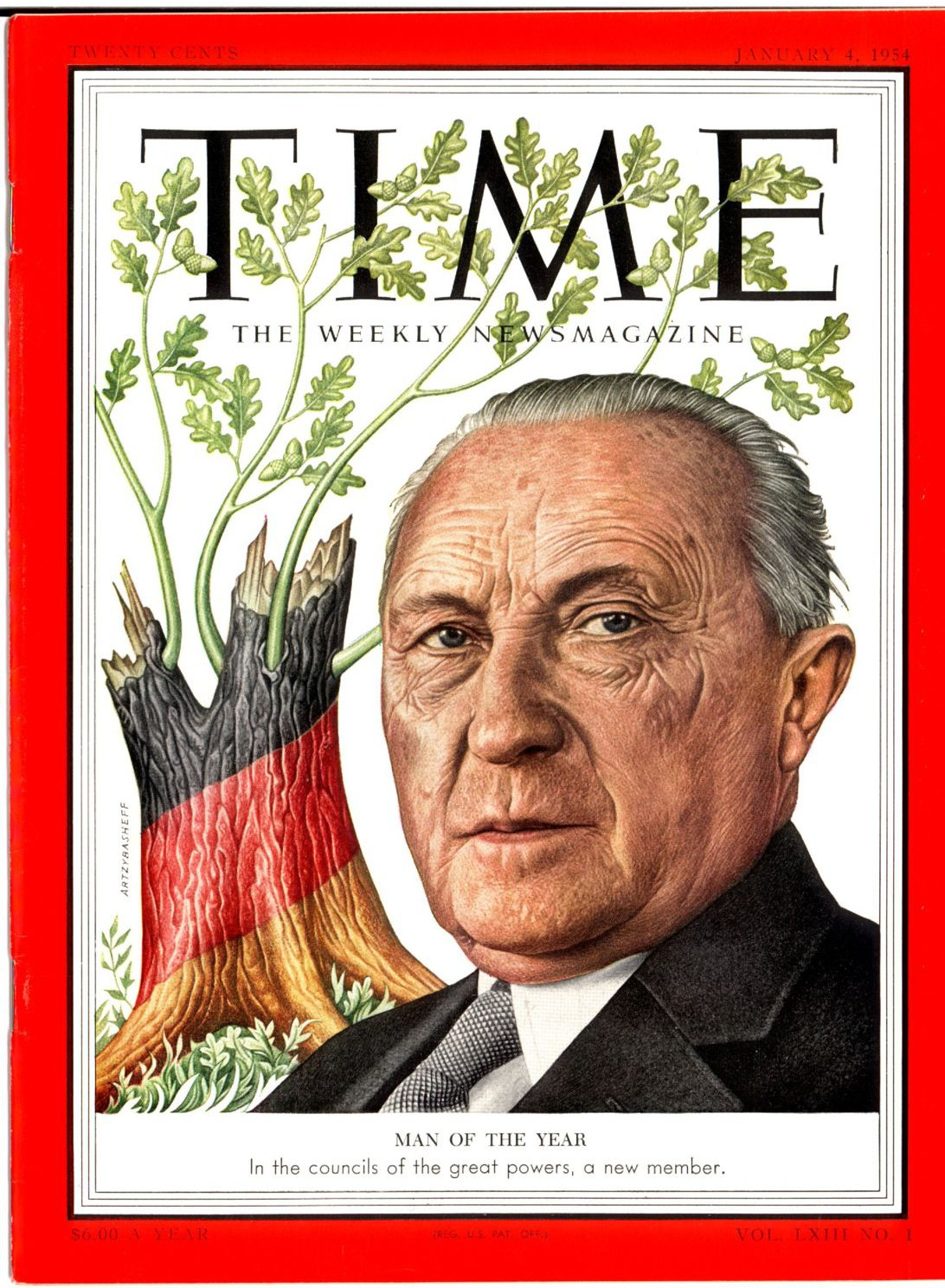
Man of the Year: Adenauer on the cover of Time (4 January 1954)

Adenauer died on 19 April 1967 at age 91 in his family home in Rhöndorf. According to his daughter, his last words were Da jitt et nix zo kriesche! (pronounced [dɔ́ ˈjɪ̂dət nɪks tsə ˈkʁîːʃə], Cologne dialect for 'There's nothin' to weep about!'). He left behind his seven children and 24 grandchildren.

Adenauer's requiem mass in Cologne Cathedral was attended by a large number of international guests which represented over one hundred countries and organizations:

- (France) French president Charles de Gaulle
- (United States) U.S. president Lyndon B. Johnson
- (Belgium) Belgian prime minister Paul Vanden Boeynants
- (Denmark) Danish prime minister Jens Otto Krag
- (United Kingdom) British prime minister Harold Wilson
- (Pahlavi Iran) Iranian prime minister Amir Abbas Hoveida
- (Iceland) Icelandic prime minister Bjarni Benediktsson
- (Italy) Italian prime minister Aldo Moro
- (Liechtenstein) Liechtensteiner prime minister Gerard Batliner
- (Luxembourg) Luxembourgish prime minister Pierre Werner
- (Netherlands) Dutch prime minister Piet de Jong
- (Norway) Norwegian prime minister Per Borten
- (Austria) Austrian chancellor Josef Klaus
- (Sweden) Swedish prime minister Tage Erlander
- (Turkey) Turkish prime minister Süleyman Demirel
- (European Union) President of the European Commission Walter Hallstein
- Secretary-General of NATO Manlio Brosio.

Thereafter his remains were taken upstream to Rhöndorf on the Rhine aboard the Seeadler-class fast attack craft Kondor of the German Navy, with two more, Seeadler and Sperber, as escorts, "past the thousands who stood in silence on both banks of the river". He is interred at the Waldfriedhof (lit. 'forest cemetery') at Rhöndorf.

When after his death, Germans were asked what they admired most about Adenauer, the majority responded that he had brought home the last German prisoners of war from the USSR, which had become known as the "Return of the 10,000". (Note: The 10,000 returnees were Wehrmacht personnel and some civilians convicted by Soviet Military Tribunals of war crimes. Among those returned in 1955 were Luftwaffe fighter ace Erich Hartmann, Generals Leopold von Babenhausen, Friedrich Foertsch, Walther von Seydlitz-Kurzbach and Hitler's personal pilot Hans Baur.)

In 2003, Adenauer was voted the "greatest German of all time" in a contest called Unsere Besten (lit. 'Our Best') run on German public-service television broadcaster ZDF in which more than three million votes were cast.

Adenauer was the main motive for the Belgian 3 pioneers of the European unification commemorative coin, minted in 2002. The obverse side shows a portrait with the names Robert Schuman, Paul-Henri Spaak, and Konrad Adenauer.

== Distinctions ==
=== National orders ===
- West Germany: Grand Cross, Special Class, of the Order of Merit of the Federal Republic of Germany (January 1954)
- Prussia: 4th class of the Order of the Red Eagle (1918)
- Bavaria: Bavarian Order of Merit (May 1958)

=== Foreign orders ===
- Argentina:
  - Grand Cross of the Order of the Liberator General San Martín
  - Grand Cross of the Order of May
- Austria:
  - Grand Decoration of Honour of the Order for Services to the Republic of Austria (first Austrian republic, 1927)
  - Grand Decoration of Honour in Gold with Sash for Services to the Republic of Austria (1956)
- Belgium: Grand Officer of the Order of Leopold (Belgium)
- Bolivia: Grand Cross of the Order of the Condor of the Andes
- Brazil: Grand Cross of the Order of the Southern Cross (July 1953)
- Chile: Grand Cross of the Order of Merit (Chile)
- Colombia: Grand Cross of the Order of Boyacá
- Cuba: Grand Cross of the Order of Carlos Manuel de Céspedes
- Dominican Republic: Grand Cross with Silver Breast Star of the Order of Merit of Duarte, Sánchez and Mella
- Ecuador: Grand Cross of the National Order of Merit (Ecuador)
- El Salvador: Grand Cross of the Order of José Simeón Cañas
- Ethiopian Empire: Grand Cross of the Order of the Holy Trinity (Ethiopia)
- France: Grand Cross of the Legion of Honour (1962)
- Haiti: Grand Cross of the National Order of Honour and Merit
- Iceland: Grand Cross of the Order of the Falcon
- Pahlavi Iran: Grand Cordon of the Order of the Crown (Iran)
- Italy: Knight Grand Cross of the Order of Merit of the Italian Republic (1953)
- Japan:
  - Grand Cordon Order of the Rising Sun (1960) – "because of his long-standing commitment to an understanding of the Japanese–German friendship, and for the peace and prosperity in the world"
  - Grand Cordon with Paulownia Flowers of the Order of the Rising Sun (1963)
- Kingdom of Afghanistan: Grand Cordon of the Order of the Supreme Sun
- Kingdom of Greece: Grand Cross of the Order of George I
- Luxembourg: Grand Cross of the Order of the Oak Crown
- Madagascar: Grand Cross of the National Order of Madagascar
- Mexico: Grand Cross of the Order of the Aztec Eagle
- Netherlands: Grand Cross of the Order of the Netherlands Lion (1960)
- Nicaragua: Grand Cross of the Orden de la Independencia Cultural Rubén Darío
- Pakistan: Nishan-e-Imtiaz
- Peru: Grand Cross of the Order of the Sun (1953)
- Portugal:
  - Knight Grand Cross of the Order of Christ (24 January 1956)
  - Knight Grand Cross of the Order of the Tower and Sword (1 October 1963)
- Senegal: Grand Cross of the National Order of the Lion
- Sovereign Military Order of Malta: Knight of the Sovereign Military Order of Malta (1951)
- Spain:
  - Grand Cross of the Order of Isabella the Catholic (1967)
  - Grand Cross of the Order of Civil Merit
- Thailand:
  - Knight Grand Cordon of the Order of the Crown of Thailand
  - Knight Grand Cordon of the Order of the White Elephant
- Tunisia: Grand Cordon of the Order of the Independence (1961)
- United Kingdom: Knight Grand Cross of the Order of St Michael and St George (1956)
- Vatican:
  - Supreme Order of Christ (September 1963)
  - Order of the Golden Spur (December 1955)
  - Honorary Knight of the Teutonic Order (1958)
  - Grand Cross of the Order of the Holy Sepulchre (1964)
- Venezuela: Grand Officer of the Order of the Liberator

=== Awards ===
- Man of the Year by the Time magazine (1953)
- Charlemagne Prize (Aachen, May 1954) – as a "powerful promoter of a united Europe"

== See also ==
- Adenauer Monument
- List of German inventors and discoverers

== Bibliography ==
- Ahonen, Pertti (1998). "Domestic Constraints on West German Ostpolitik: The Role of the Expellee Organizations in the Adenauer Era". Central European History. 31 (1): 31–63. doi:10.1017/S0008938900016034. S2CID 143471607.
- Epstein, Klaus (October 1967). "Adenauer and Rhenish Separatism". The Review of Politics. 29 (4): 536–545. doi:10.1017/s0034670500040614. S2CID 143511307.
- Frei, Norbert (2002). Adenauer's Germany and the Nazi Past: The Politics of Amnesty and Integration. New York: Columbia University Press. ISBN 0-231-11882-1.
- Gaddis, John Lewis (1998). We Now Know: Rethinking Cold War History. New York: Oxford University Press. ISBN 978-0-19-878070-0.
- Goda, Norman J. W. (2007). Tales from Spandau: Nazi Criminals and the Cold War. Cambridge: Cambridge University Press. ISBN 978-0-521-86720-7.
- Granieri, Ronald J. (2004). The Ambivalent Alliance: Konrad Adenauer, the CDU/CSU, and the West, 1949–1966. New York: Berghahn Books. ISBN 978-1-57181-492-0.
- Herf, Jeffrey (1997). Divided Memory: The Nazi Past in the Two Germanys. Cambridge: Harvard University Press. ISBN 0-674-21303-3.
- Large, David Clay (1996). Germans to the Front: West German Rearmament in the Adenauer Era. Chapel Hill: University of North Carolina Press. ISBN 0-8078-4539-6.
- Mitchell, Maria (2012). The Origins of Christian Democracy: Politics and Confession in Modern Germany. Ann Arbor: University of Michigan Press. ISBN 978-0-472-11841-0.
- Schwarz, Hans-Peter (1995). Konrad Adenauer: A German Politician and Statesman in a Period of War, Revolution and Reconstruction. Vol. 1: From the German Empire to the Federal Republic, 1876–1952. Oxford: Berghahn Books. ISBN 1-57181-870-7. online
- — (1997). Konrad Adenauer: A German Politician and Statesman in a Period of War, Revolution and Reconstruction. Vol. 2: The Statesman: 1952–1967. Providence: Berghahn Books. ISBN 1-57181-960-6.
- Williams, Charles (2001). Konrad Adenauer: The Father of the New Germany. Wiley. ISBN 978-0-471-40737-9.

German Bundestag
New constituency	Member of the Bundestag for Bonn; 1949–1967	Succeeded by Alo Hauser
Political offices
Preceded by Max Wallraf	Mayor of Cologne; 1917–1933	Succeeded by Günter Riesen
Vacant Title last held by Dietlof von Arnim-Boitzenburg as President of the Prussian House of Lords	President of the Prussian State Council; 1921–1933	Succeeded by Robert Ley
Preceded by Willi Suth	Mayor of Cologne; 1945	Succeeded by Willi Suth
Vacant	Chancellor of West Germany; 1949–1963	Succeeded by Ludwig Erhard
Vacant	Federal Minister for Foreign Affairs; 1951–1955	Succeeded by Heinrich von Brentano
Party political offices
New political party	Leader of the Christian Democratic Union in the British Zone; 1946–1951	Succeeded by Wilhelm Johnen
New political party	Leader of the CDU/CSU Group in the Bundestag; 1949	Succeeded by Heinrich von Brentano
New political party	Leader of the Christian Democratic Union; 1950–1966	Succeeded by Ludwig Erhard
