= Adenauer Monument =

Monument to Konrad Adenauer in Cologne, Germany

Coordinates: 50°56′12″N 6°56′42″E

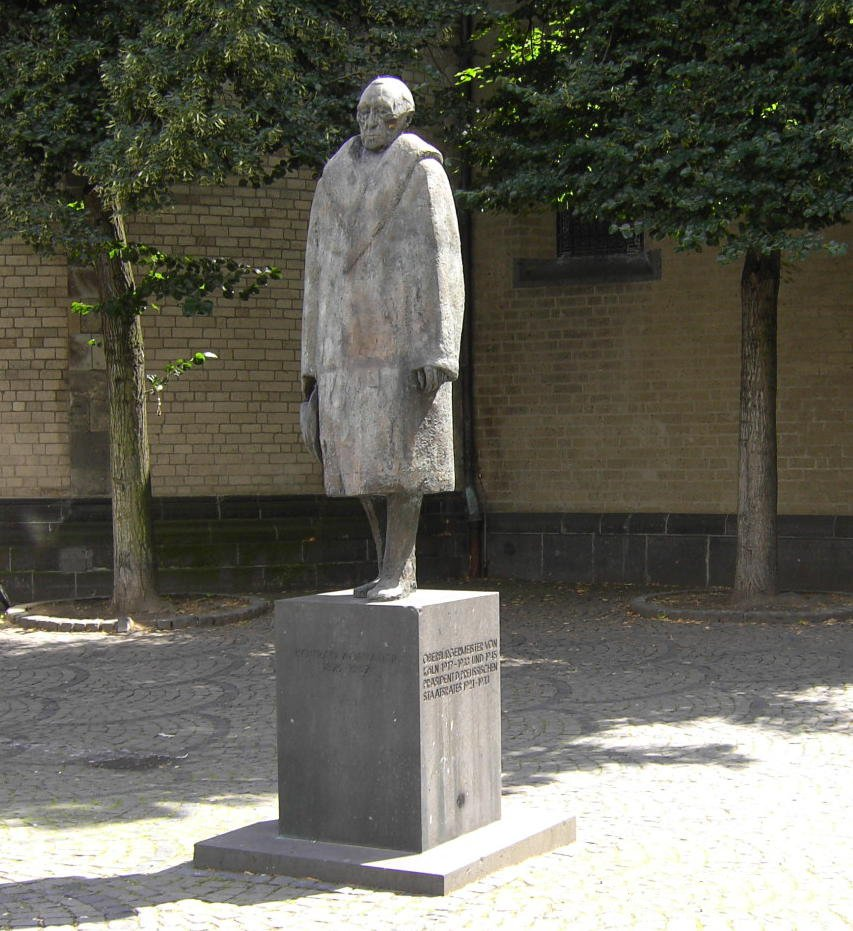
Konrad Adenauer Monument (2007)

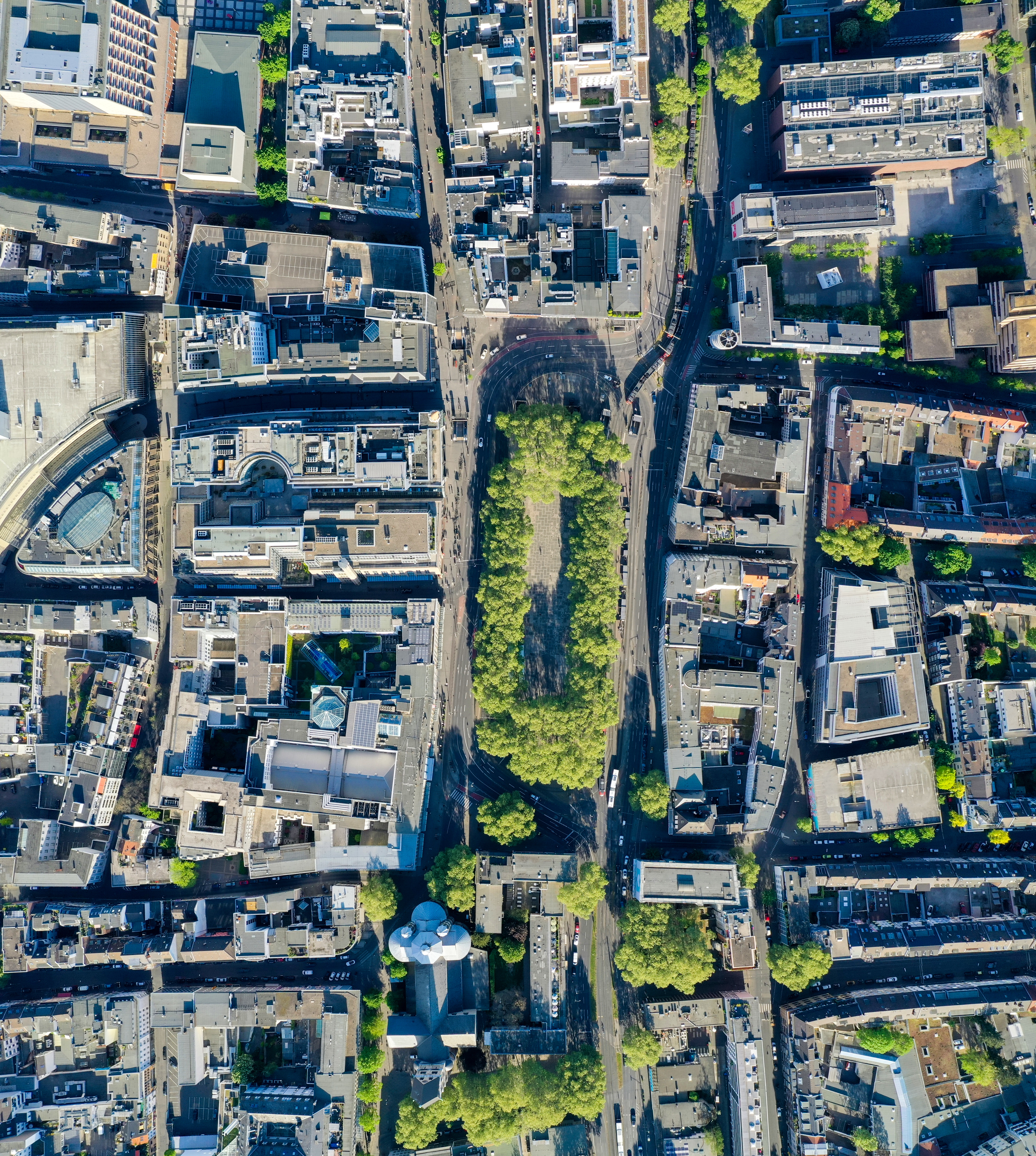
Neumarkt with Basilica of the Holy Apostles, Cologne (2020)

The Konrad Adenauer Monument (in German: Konrad-Adenauer-Denkmal) in Cologne is a monument dedicated to Konrad Adenauer, inaugurated on 1 July 1995. It is located at the intersection of Apostelnstraße and Mittelstraße, northwest of the Neumarkt.

The monument near the Church of the Holy Apostles in Cologne's city centre was commissioned by Cologne-based entrepreneurs and unveiled in 1995 under the patronage of CDU chairman and Federal Chancellor Helmut Kohl.

The total cost of the monument came to 500.000 Mark.

The monument was originally begun by the German artist Hans Wimmer and later completed in Cologne by the German sculptor Gerd Weiland. In 1999, Weiland also created a marble bust of Adenauer for the Walhalla in Donaustauf.

The former mayor of Cologne, president of the Prussian State Council, and federal chancellor is depicted wearing an oversized coat that makes his head appear comparatively small. He holds a hat in his right hand.
