= Central Office of the State Justice Administrations for the Investigation of National Socialist Crimes =

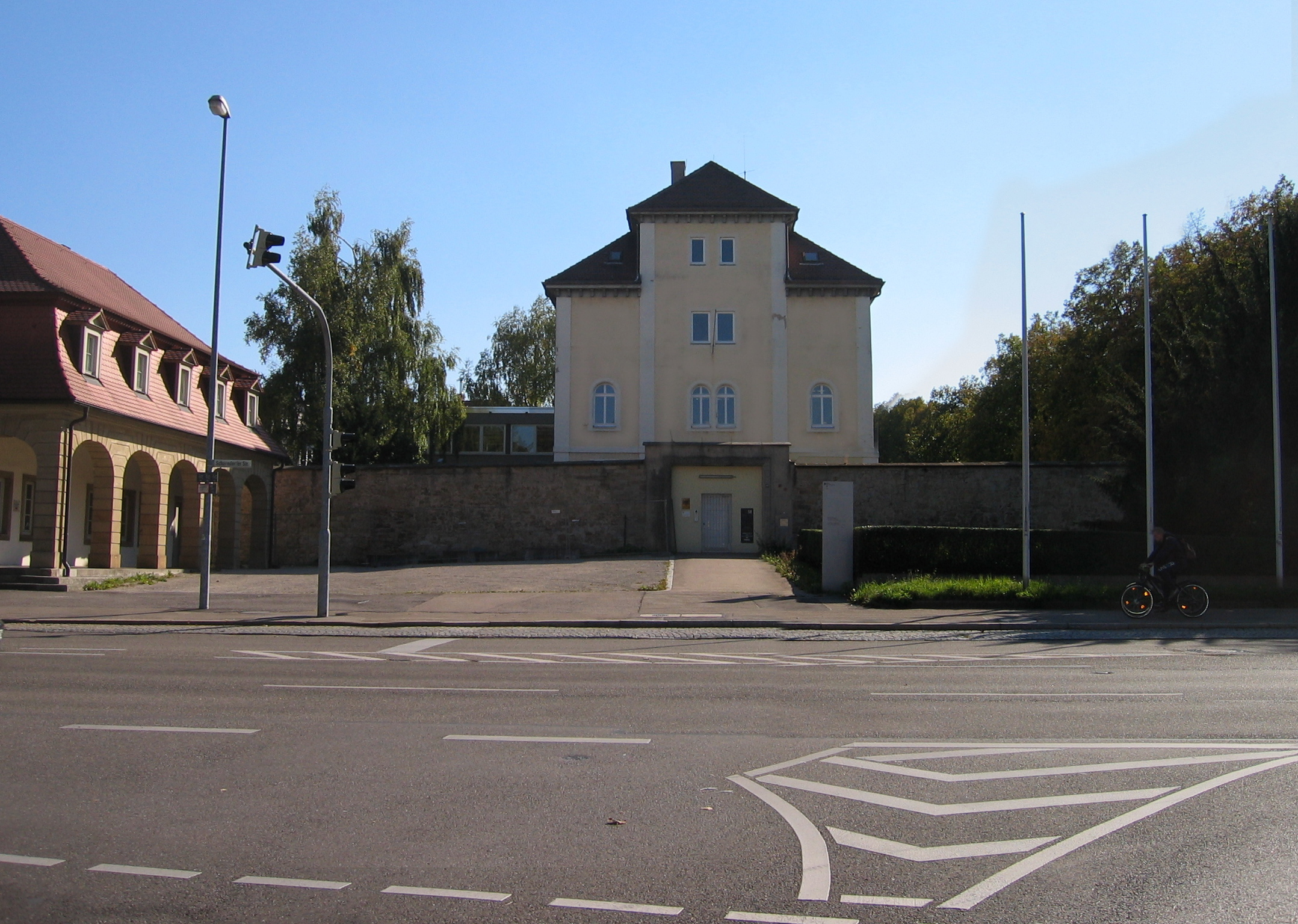
Bundesarchiv Aussenstelle Ludwigsburg am Schorndorfer Torhaus

The Central Office of the State Justice Administrations for the Investigation of National Socialist Crimes (German: Zentrale Stelle der Landesjustizverwaltungen zur Aufklärung nationalsozialistischer Verbrechen; in short Zentrale Stelle or Z Commission) is Germany's main agency responsible for investigating war crimes during Nazi rule. The commission possesses the largest collection of files, documentation and materials concerning criminal activities during Nazi rule. The Central Office is located in Ludwigsburg.

== Background ==
Prior to the foundation of West Germany in 1949, Nazi war crimes were investigated by Allied authorities that governed Germany, famously with the Nuremberg Trials. After 1949, the duties of investigation were transferred to the police authorities of the new state. However, after the Ulm Einsatzkommando trial in 1958 of Gestapo and SS officers responsible for crimes along the German-Lithuanian front at the beginning of German's invasion of Soviet Union in 1941, German authorities decided that a large number of Nazi crimes that had occurred outside Germany itself had remained uninvestigated. Historian Annette Weinke claims that despite being at the very epicenter of post-war justice for Nazi prosecutions since its creation, most people (Germans included) have little idea that this "modest little office" even exists.

== Creation and functions ==
To this end, the justice ministries of German states formed the Central Office of the State Justice Administrations for the Investigation of National Socialist Crimes in December 1958. Initially, the office was restricted to investigating crimes that occurred outside Germany and only those committed against civilians (distinct from those occurring during wartime operations). Subsequent changes in law and the statute of limitations have empowered the Central Office to investigate all war crimes without limitations in time or extent. The Central Office uses systematic research to investigate and assemble groups of connected crimes. Charged with completing preliminary investigation, the Central Office transfers the charge of full investigation to the official police and state justice ministries. State prosecutors are required to inform the Central Office of important investigative results and the final judicial conclusions.

The Central Office investigates almost all categories of crimes – those perpetrated by the SS, German military and police units, the Gestapo as well as concentration camps for Jews and other targeted communities (Auschwitz, Majdanek, Kulmhof, Belzec, Treblinka and Sobibor), the "Euthanasia" testing on humans, systematic crimes on prisoners of war (Kommissarerlaß – "superintendents' permission") as well as the role of the highest state and political offices and their employees in the planning and execution of crimes. Since its formation, the Central Office has helped track down and prosecute almost 7,000 Nazi criminals and collaborated with the agencies of other nations to track down war criminals.

In 2013, after the successful initial prosecution of John Demjanjuk, Kurt Shrimm announced that the office would be seeking prosecutions of another 50 low level concentration camp staff. According to Der Spiegel it is unlikely that more than two of the cases will be prosecuted.

== Archives ==
The Central Office has amassed a vast collection of documents, records and files detailing the crimes, including the "Röhm Putsch", the "Reichskristallnacht", single executions of foreign workers by the Gestapo, etc. Evidence can be found for practically all of the scenes and series of crimes. Excerpts (copies and microfiche films) from archive material both in and outside Germany can be found, especially from Eastern European archives. Most of this unique documentation has been transferred since April, 2000 to the National Archive, Ludwigsburg branch. The branch is instructed to preserve and keep the documents accessible for historical research and other interested parties entitled to the information. As a part of this the National Archive could participate in the institution of the research unit of the University of Stuttgart in Ludwigsburg.

== See also ==
- Main Commission for Pursuing Crimes against the Polish Nation
