= Ulm Einsatzkommando trial =

1958 trial in Ulm, West Germany

The Ulm Einsatzkommando trial (1958), in the West German city of Ulm, in the southwestern state of Baden-Württemberg, was the first major trial of Nazi crimes under West German law (rather than by an international or military tribunal). Ten suspects, former members of the Einsatzkommando Tilsit, were charged for their involvement in war crimes committed in Lithuania, in 1941. All were convicted as accessories to mass murder and were sentenced to prison terms ranging from three to fifteen years. The chief perpetrators were held to be those from whom the orders had come down.

== Trial ==
The senior public prosecutor, Erwin Schüle, used the documents from the American Einsatzgruppen trial in Nuremberg, the existing specialist literature, SS personnel files, and surviving "USSR event reports" as evidence. During the trial, the public, which initially paid minimal attention, became increasingly horrified by the details. For example, Hans-Joachim Böhme had enjoyed a walk on the beach shortly before presiding over the killings of 100 Jews. In addition, the perpetrators had photographed each other next to the mass graves before getting drunk in the nearest pub, paying the bills with money taken from their victims. It also became clear that only a minority of the perpetrators refused to kill, despite a lack of serious consequences if they chose to do so. The trial drew even more attention when three of the witnesses, who had been implicated in the massacres themselves, committed suicide.

Schüle sought murder convictions for all of the defendants, which carried a mandatory life sentence. In his closing statement, he emphasized the humanity of the victims.

They were people who laughed, cried, loved and worked... The sun hasn't shone for them for 17 years, and the victims don't even have the peace of the grave. Their graves were later torn up, the bodies burned and the ashes scattered to the four winds.

The defendants were all found guilty of being accessories to mass murder and received prison terms ranging from three to fifteen years. In its verdict, the court deemed Adolf Hitler, Heinrich Himmler, and Reinhard Heydrich to be the main perpetrators. It ruled that the defendants had only acted as accomplices, as "mere tools of the leader".

== Aftermath ==
Shortly after the verdicts, the Allensbach Institute, for the first time, asked West Germans for their opinions on the trials of Nazi perpetrators. Almost 54 percent of those surveyed supported additional prosecutions. Criticism also became louder from politicians and even the judiciary. In response to public concern, the West German government formed the Central Office of the State Justice Administrations for the Investigation of National Socialist Crimes, (Zentrale Stelle der Landesjustizverwaltungen zur Aufklärungen national-sozialistischer Gewaltverbrechen, or ZS). Within a short period, the Central Office initiated investigations into hundreds of cases of German war crimes in the east.
