= List of flags with the Cross of Trier in heraldry =

Flag with the Cross of Trier

List of flags with the Cross of Trier in heraldry contains the flags with the Red Cross of the Archbishopric of Trier, that existed from the end of the 9th to the early 19th century.

== States ==
Rheinland-Pfalz

Saarland

Rheinland-Pfalz

Saarland

== Counties and county-free cities ==
Koblenz

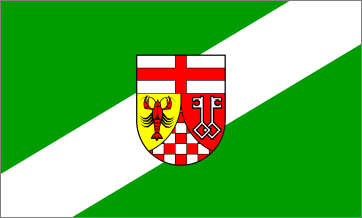
Landkreis Bernkastel-Wittlich

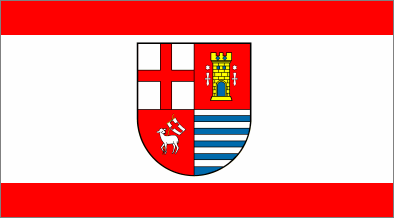
Landkreis Bitburg-Prüm

Landkreis Cochem-Zell

Landkreis Merzig-Wadern

Landkreis Neuwied

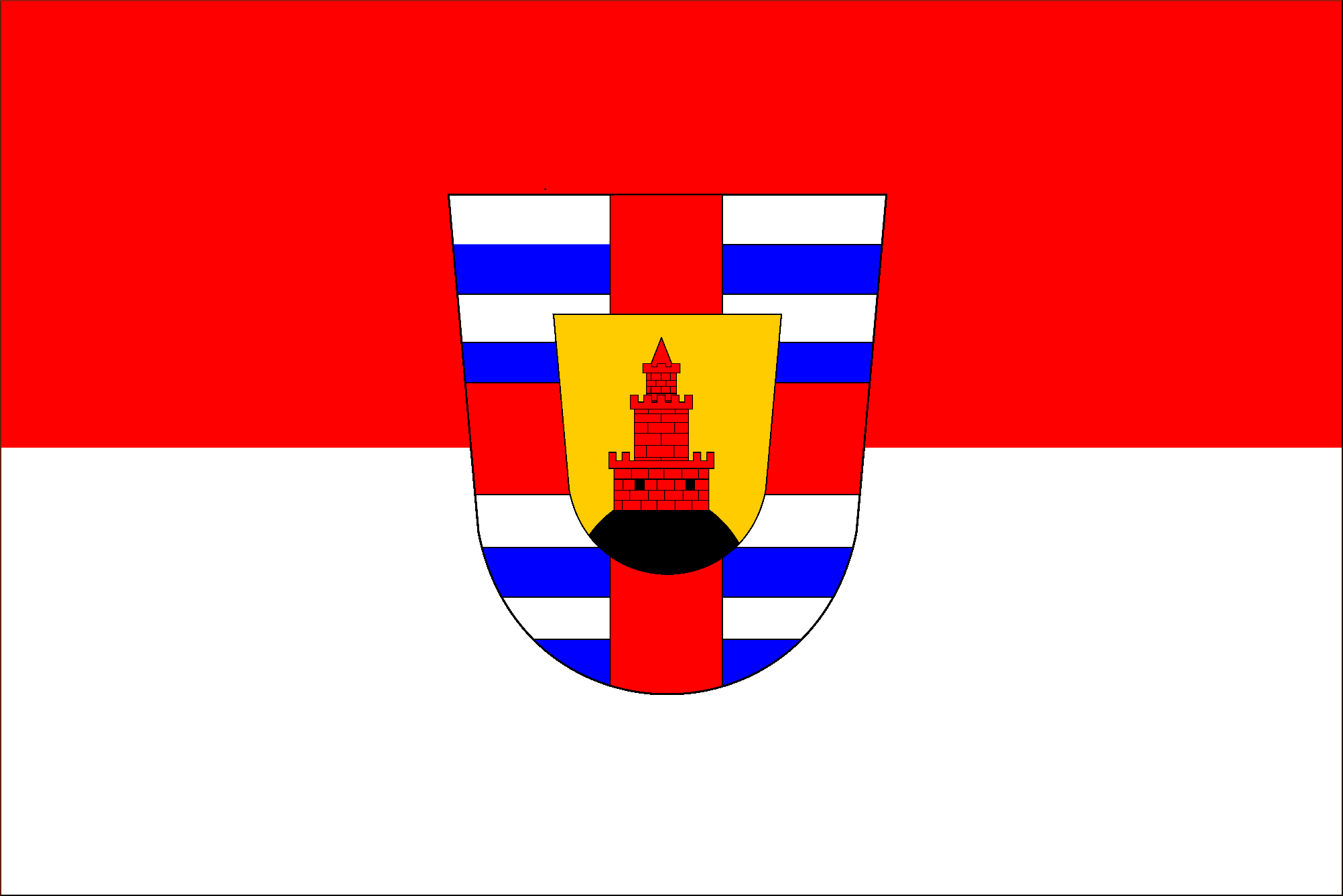
Landkreis Trier-Saarburg

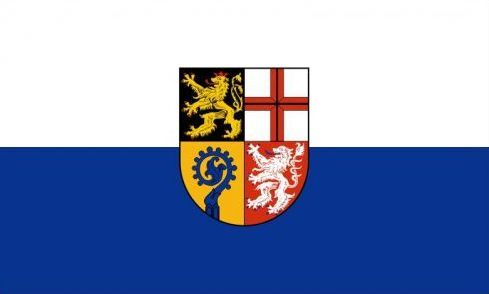
Saarpfalz-Kreis

Vulkaneifelkreis

== Associated municipalities ==
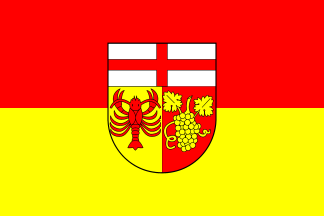
Bernkastel-Kues (Verbandsgemeinde)

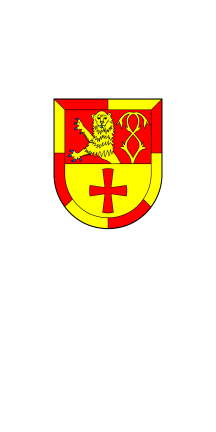
Daaden (Verbandsgemeinde)

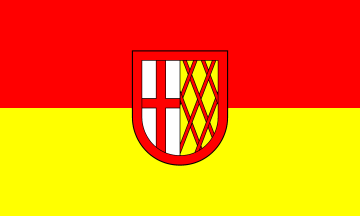
Daun (Verbandsgemeinde)

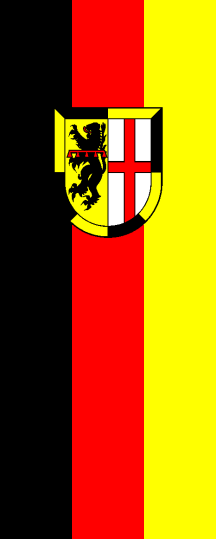
Gerolstein (Verbandsgemeinde)

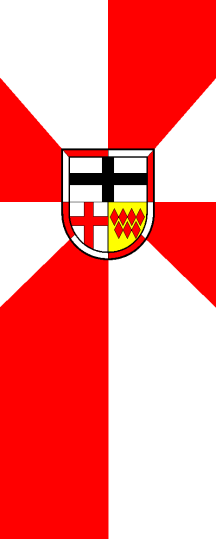
Kelberg (Verbandsgemeinde)

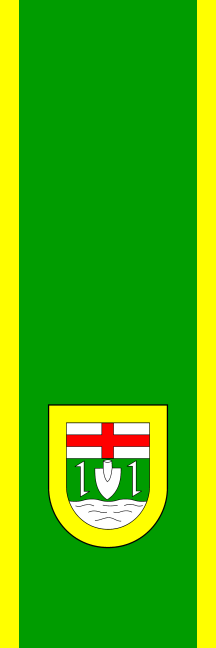
Kell am See (Verbandsgemeinde)

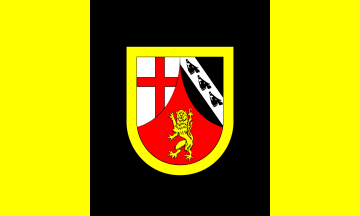
Kirchen (Verbandsgemeinde)

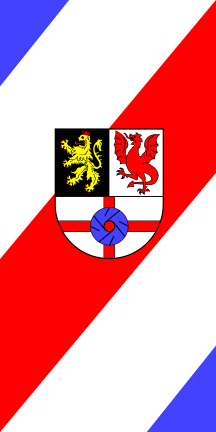
Mendig (Verbandsgemeinde)

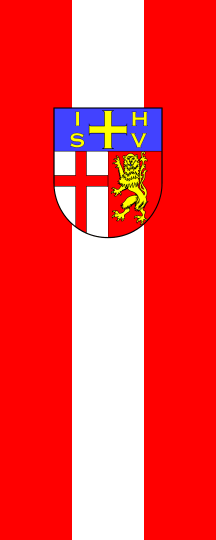
Neumagen-Dhron (Verbandsgemeinde)

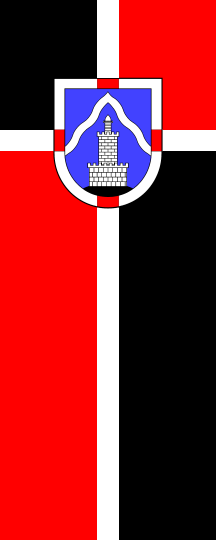
Saarburg (Verbandsgemeinde)

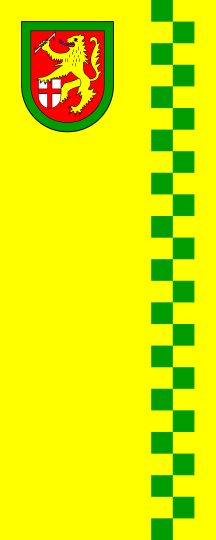
Thalfang am Erbeskopf

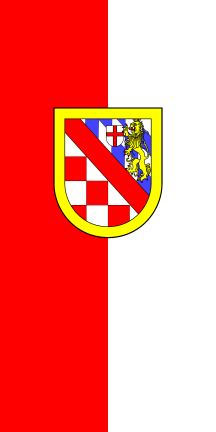
Traben-Trarbach (Verbandsgemeinde)

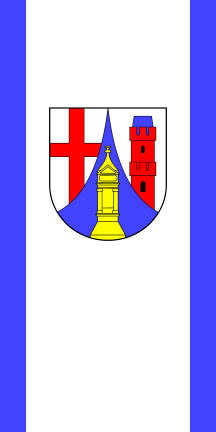
Trier-Land

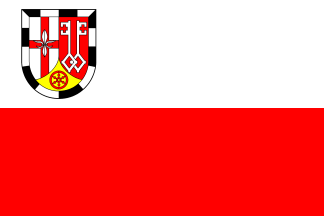
Wittlich-Land

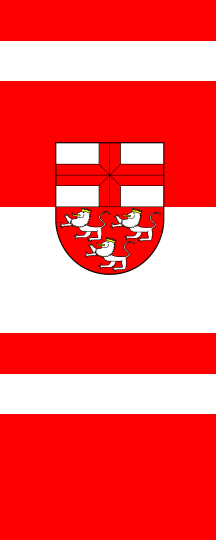
Zell (Verbandsgemeinde)

== Cities and municipalities ==
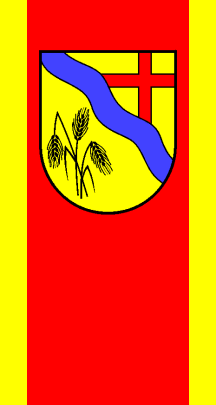
Arbach

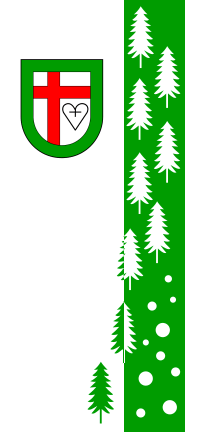
Berglicht

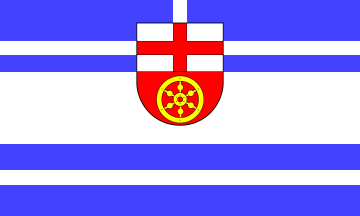
Binsfeld

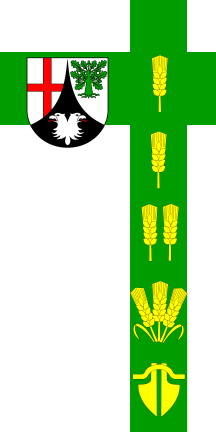
Breit

Burg

Burg (vertical)

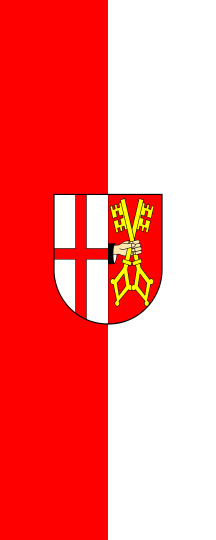
Cochem

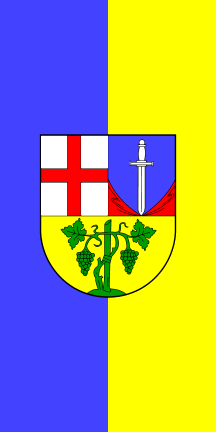
Ensch

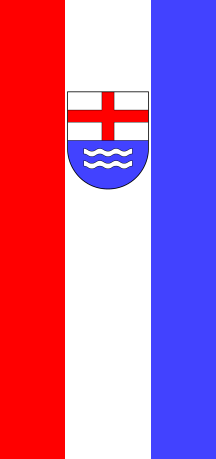
Flußbach

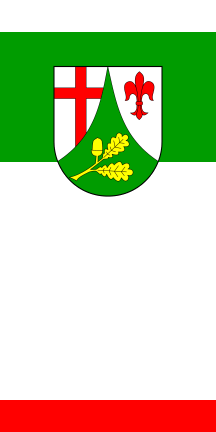
Gipperath

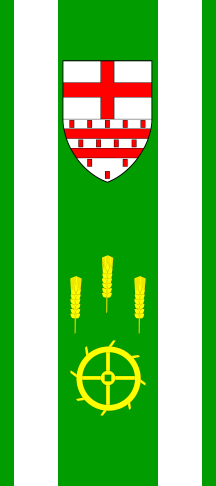
Gräfendhron

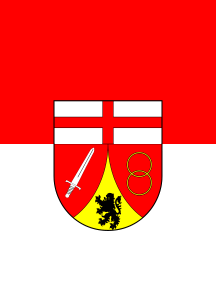
Großlittgen

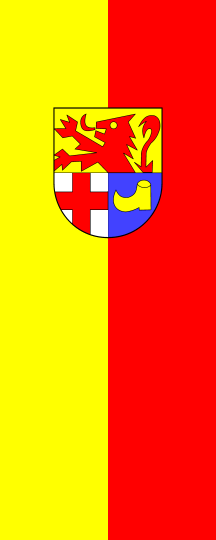
Gusterath

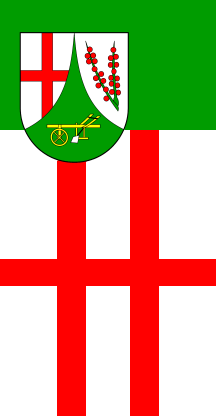
Heidenburg

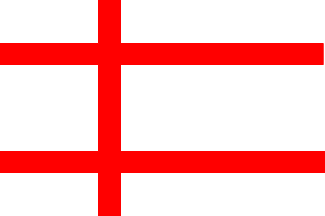
Hermeskeil

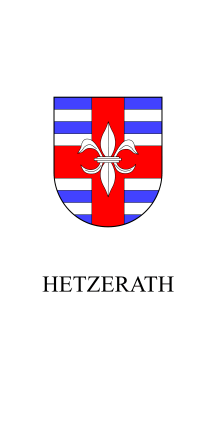
Hetzerath

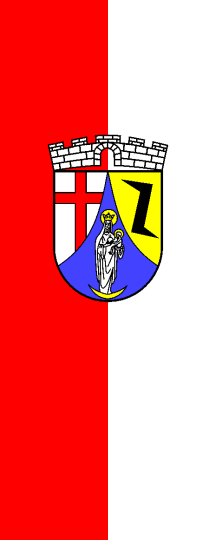
Hillesheim

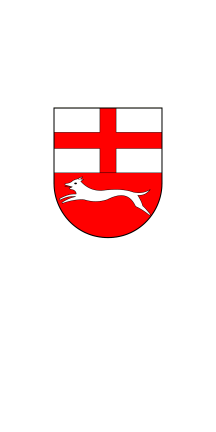
Hontheim

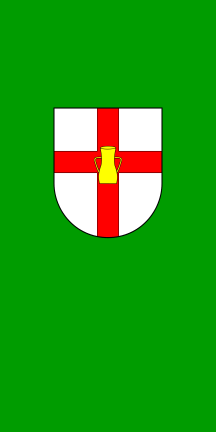
Horath

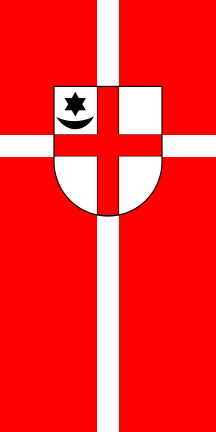
Kaisersesch

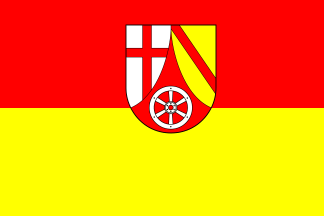
Karl

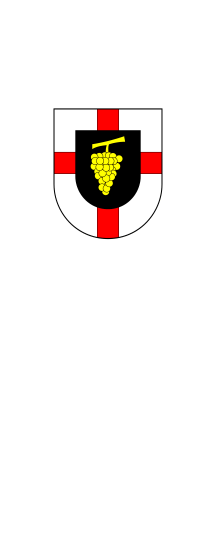
Kesten

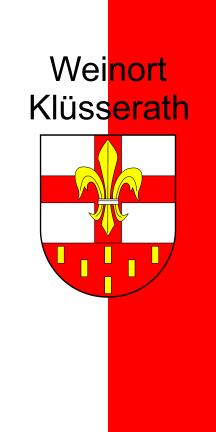
Klüsserath

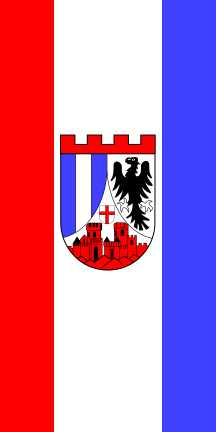
Kobern-Gondorf

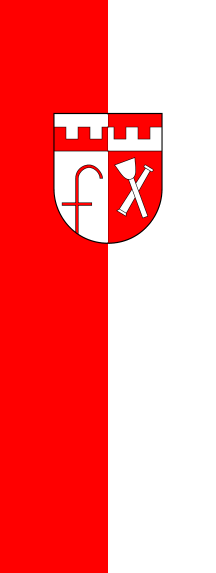
Kordel

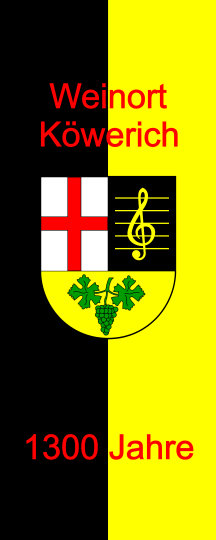
Köwerich

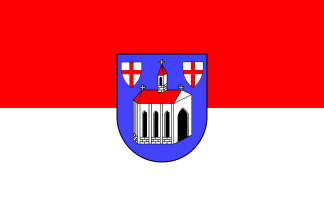
Kyllburg

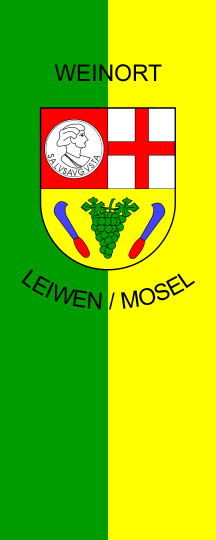
Leiwen

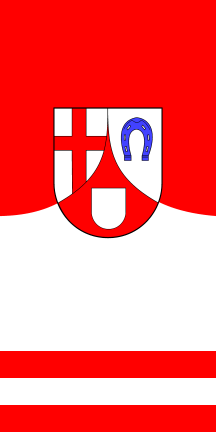
Longen

Longkamp

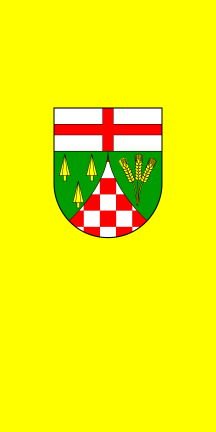
Malborn

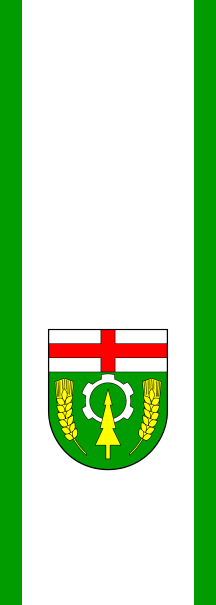
Mandern

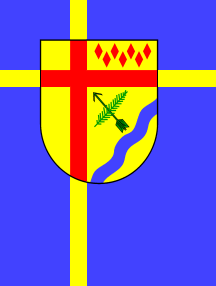
Mannebach

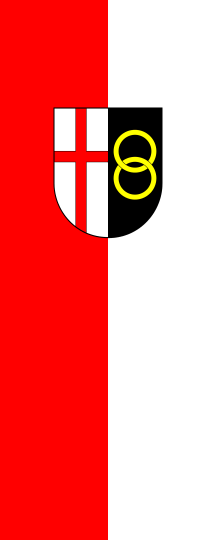
Maring-Noviand

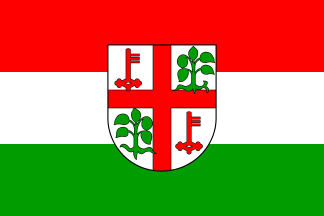
Mayen

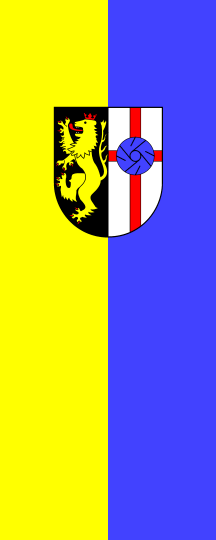
Mendig

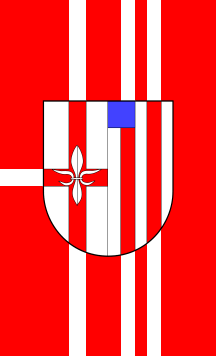
Minderlittgen

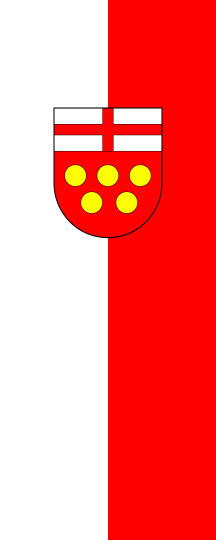
Monzelfeld

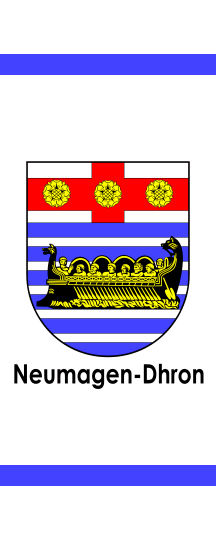
Neumagen-Dhron

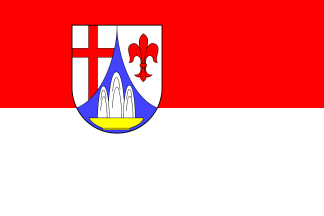
Niederöfflingen

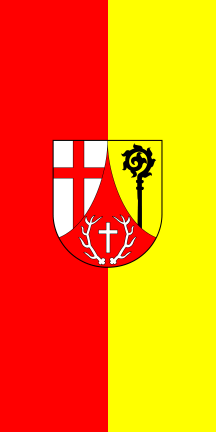
Niederscheidweiler

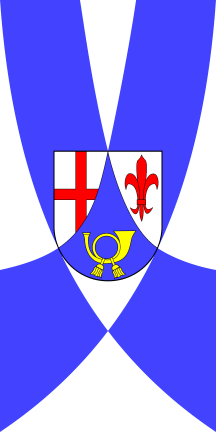
Oberscheidweiler

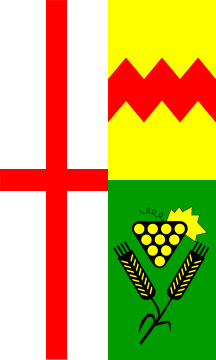
Osann-Monzel

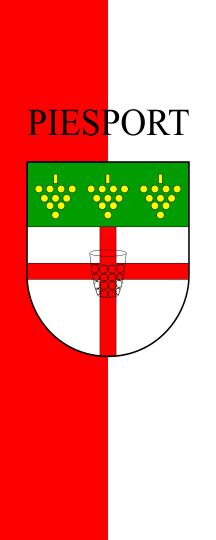
Piesport

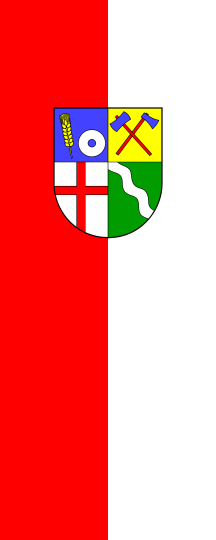
Plaidt

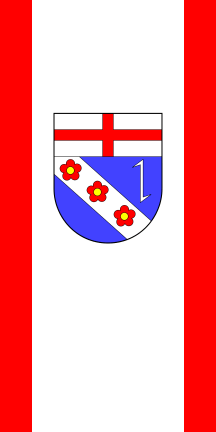
Platten

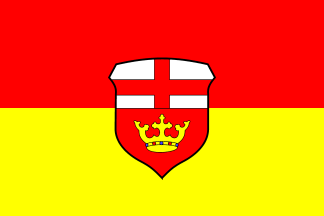
Polch

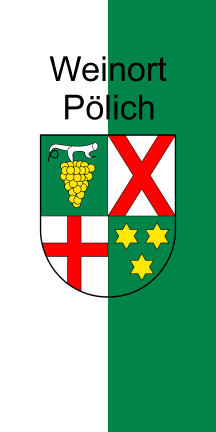
Pölich

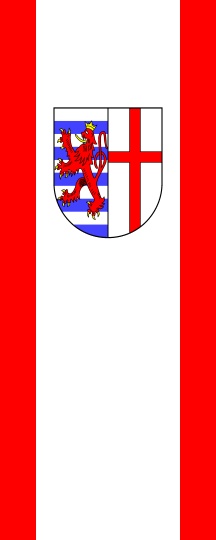
Pronsfeld

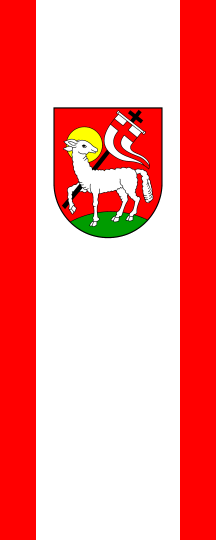
Prüm

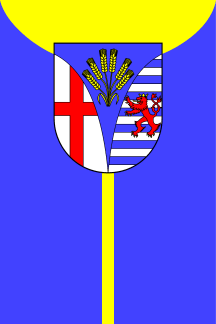
Ralingen

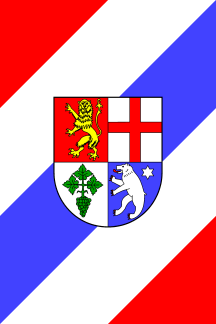
Riol

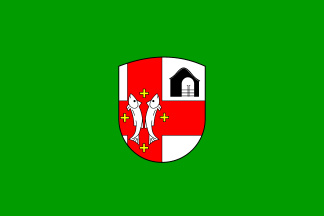
Thalfang

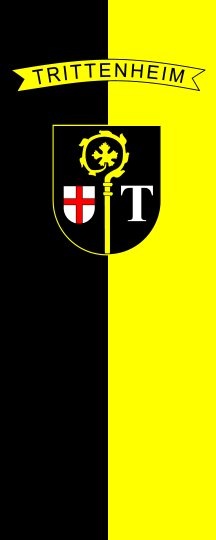
Trittenheim

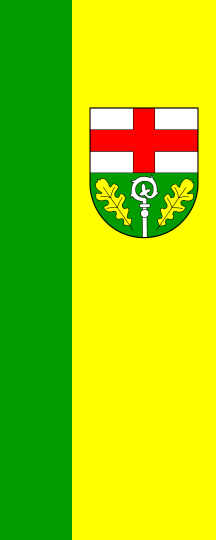
Waldweiler

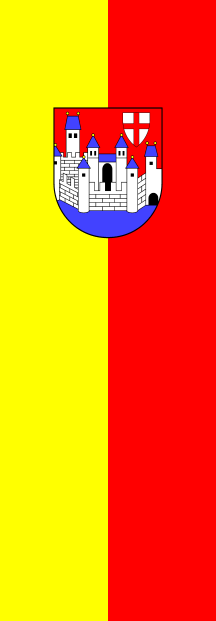
Welschbillig

Wincheringen

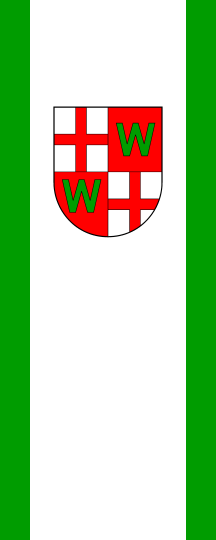
Wintrich

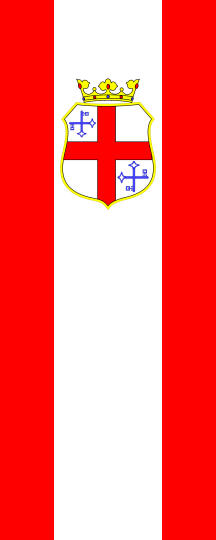
Zell (Mosel)
