= Feller Bach =

River in Germany

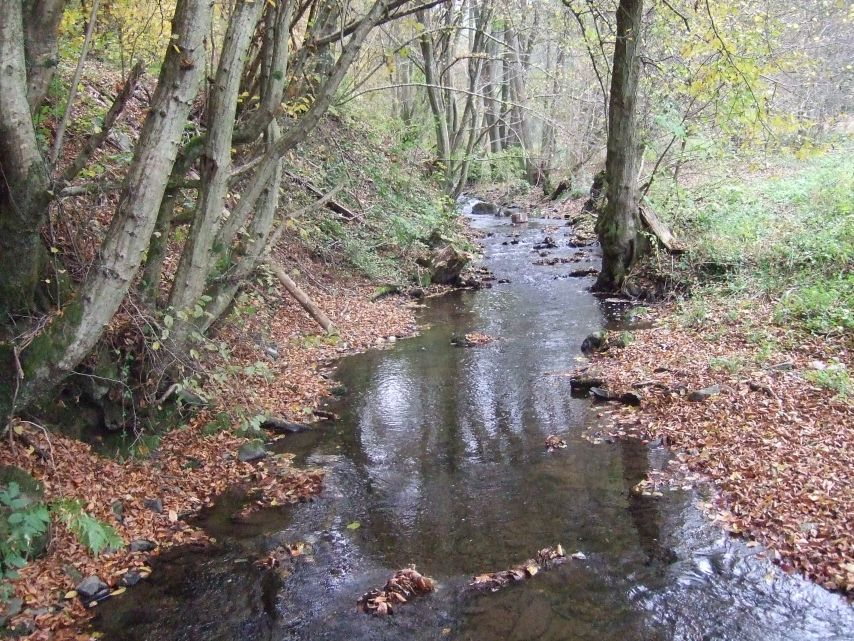

Location
- Country: Germany
- State: Rhineland-Palatinate

Physical characteristics
- Mouth
  - location: Moselle
  - coordinates: 49.8020°N 6.7841°E

Basin features
- Progression: Moselle→ Rhine→ North Sea

The Feller Bach is a right tributary of the Moselle in Rhineland-Palatinate (Germany). Its source is in the Hunsrück mountains. It flows through the villages Lorscheid (Verbandsgemeinde Ruwer), Fell and Riol (Verbandsgemeinde Schweich). It joins the Moselle in Riol.

At the left there is the Thommer Bach in the Nossernvalley with the Fell Exhibition Slate Mine (Besucherbergwerk Fell).

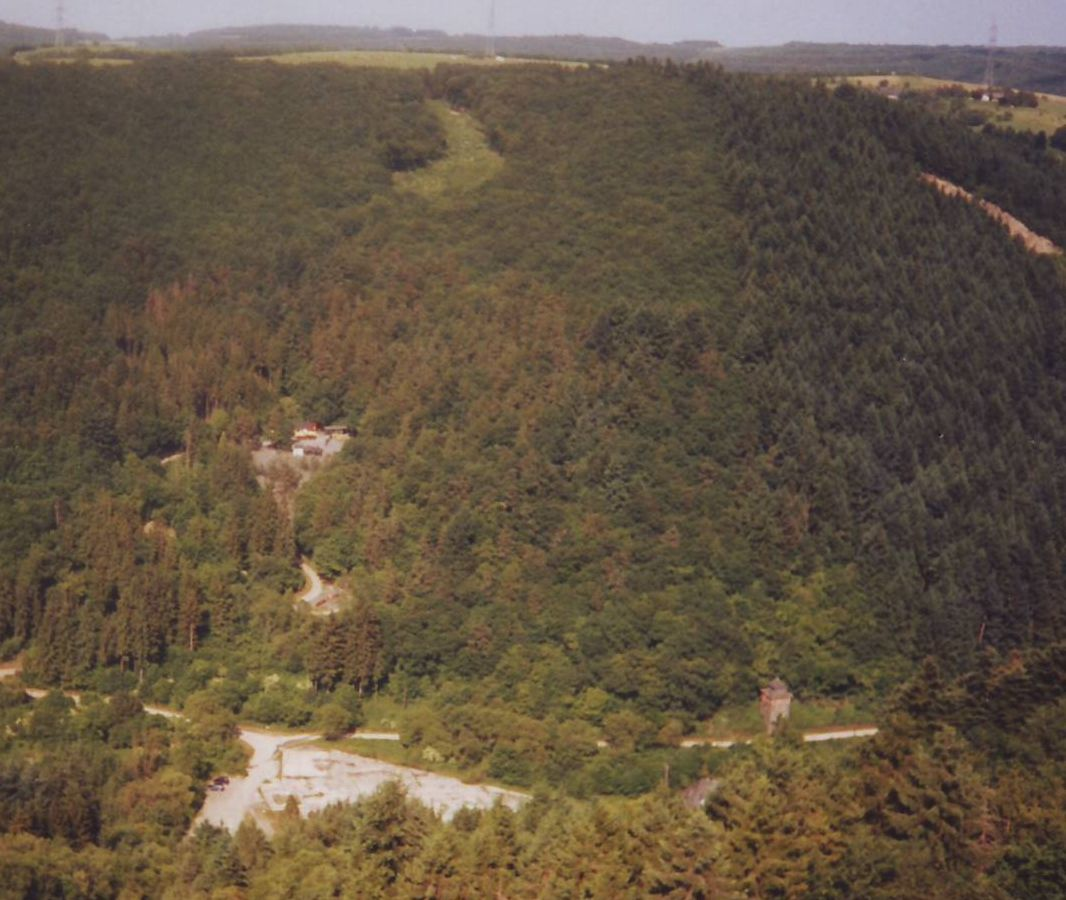
Slate mine Fell (upper left) and the former concrete block work (down) in the Nossern Valley
