= Trittenheim =

- Municipality
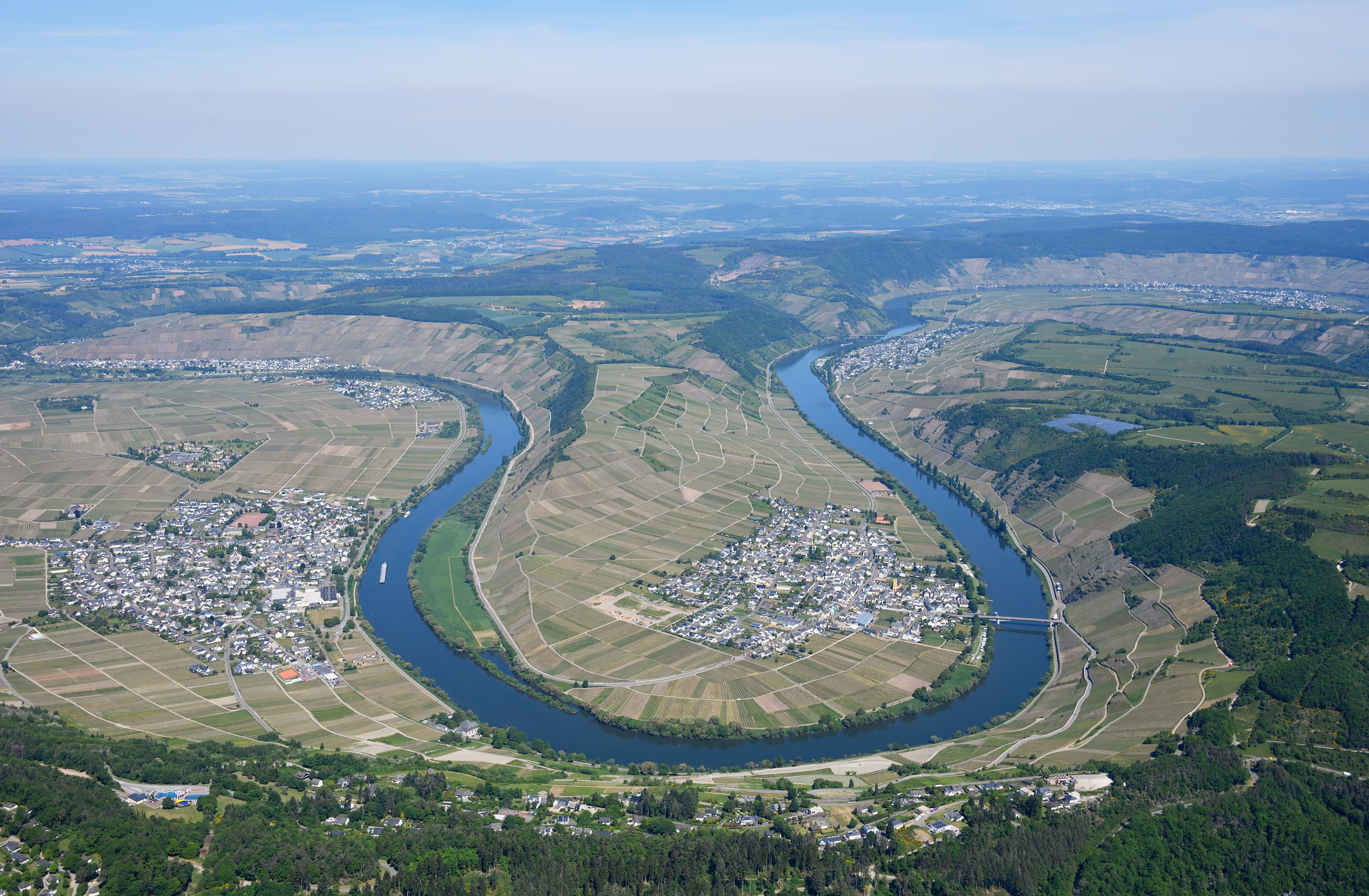

- Coat of arms

- Location of Trittenheim within Trier-Saarburg district
- Interactive map of Trittenheim
- Location within Germany Location within Rhineland-Palatinate
- Coordinates: 49°49′33″N 6°54′02″E
- Country: Germany
- State: Rhineland-Palatinate
- District: Trier-Saarburg
- Municipal assoc.: Schweich an der Römischen Weinstraße

Government
  - Mayor (2019–24): Franz-Josef Bollig

Area
  - Total: 10.10 km^{2} (3.90 sq mi)
- Elevation: 110 m (360 ft)

Population (2025-12-31)
  - Total: 1,065
  - Density: 105.4/km^{2} (273.1/sq mi)
- Time zone: UTC+01:00 (CET)
  - Summer (DST): UTC+02:00 (CEST)
- Postal codes: 54349
- Dialling codes: 06507
- Vehicle registration: TR
- Website: www.trittenheim.de

Trittenheim on the Middle Moselle is an Ortsgemeinde – a municipality belonging to a Verbandsgemeinde, a kind of collective municipality – in the Trier-Saarburg district (before January 2012: Bernkastel-Wittlich district) in Rhineland-Palatinate, Germany.

== Geography ==
=== Location ===
Trittenheim lies on the even slope of a tongue of land (a point bar) formed by a tight bend in the Moselle. Trittenheim belongs to the Verbandsgemeinde of Schweich an der Römischen Weinstraße, whose seat is in the town Schweich.

=== Nearby cities and towns ===
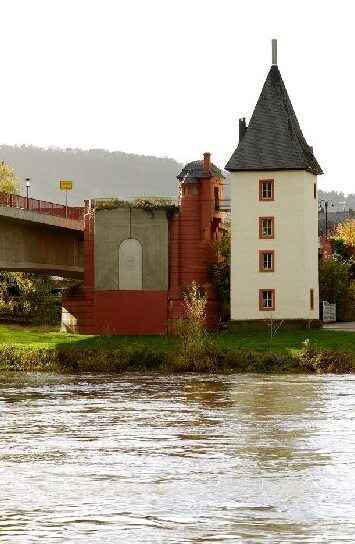
Head of the old Moselle bridge and the new Moselle bridge at Trittenheim

The nearest middle centre is Bernkastel-Kues, about 25 km away, and the nearest upper centre is Trier, about 30 km away.

Other cities and towns within a 120 km radius are, with rough distances to each:

- Schweich — 16 km
- Wittlich — 30 km
- Kaiserslautern — 110 km
- Koblenz — 120 km

Also, it is roughly 40 km to the border with the Grand Duchy of Luxembourg.

== History ==
Having been founded as a Frankish settlement, Trittenheim had its first documentary mention in 893 in the Prümer Urbar, a catalogue of Prüm Abbey’s holdings, and for a long time was Electoral-Trier domain. Beginning in 1794, Trittenheim lay under French rule. In 1814 it was assigned to the Kingdom of Prussia at the Congress of Vienna. Since 1947, it has been part of the then newly founded state of Rhineland-Palatinate.

== Politics ==
=== Municipal council ===
The council is made up of 16 council members, who were elected by proportional representation at the municipal election held on 7 June 2009, and the honorary mayor as chairman.

The municipal election held on 7 June 2009 yielded the following results:

Year	Bollig	Kaufmann	Total
2009	9	7	16 seats

=== Mayor ===
The current mayor is Franz-Josef Bollig.

=== Coat of arms ===
The municipality’s arms might be described thus: Sable issuant from base an abbot’s staff terminating in a grapeleaf palewise inside the crook or between in base an inescutcheon argent charged with a cross gules and a cross tau, the upper arms clechée, of the third.

== Culture and sightseeing ==
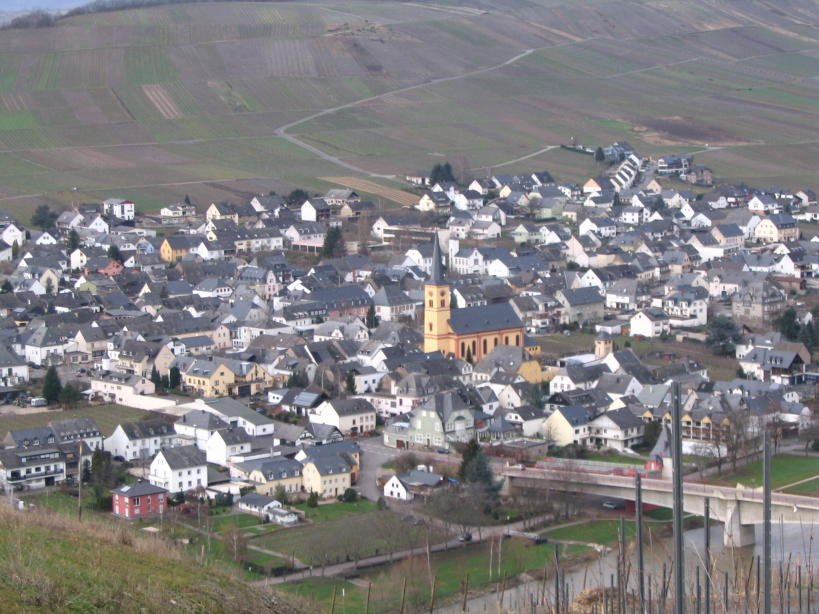
Trittenheim

- Late Baroque parish church with Early Classicist elements
- Five-part Bildstock cycle for the schmerzreicher Rosenkranz (“painful rose wreath”) of 1654
- Baptismal font
- Saint Lawrence’s Chapel (Laurentius-Kapelle) in the vineyards (expanded in 1583)
- Hinkelstein (monolith)

== Economy and infrastructure ==
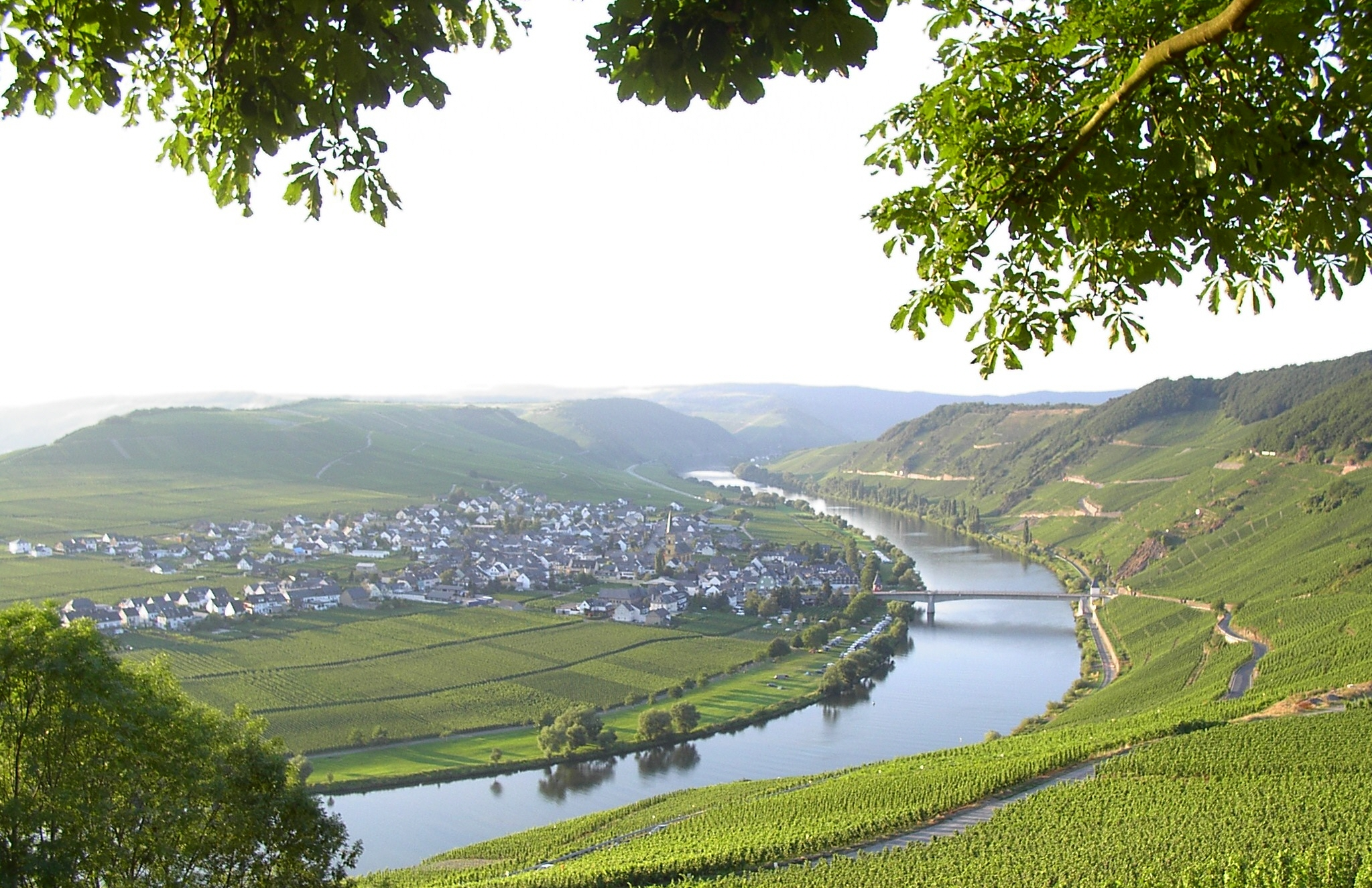
View of the bend in the Moselle from Trittenheim

Trittenheim is characterized considerably by winegrowing, and with 236 ha of vineyards under cultivation is after Piesport, Zell, Leiwen, Konz, Neumagen-Dhron, Mehring and Bernkastel-Kues the eighth biggest winegrowing centre in the Mosel wine region. Traditionally, it is mainly Riesling that is grown. The best known vineyards are Trittenheimer Apotheke and Trittenheimer Altärchen, both of which belong to the winemaking appellation – Großlage – of Piesporter Michelsberg. Winegrowing also forms the basis for the tourism, which likewise stands as an important economic factor.

== Famous people ==
In 1462, Johann Heidenberg, a humanist known as Johannes Trithemius (d. 1516 in Würzburg) was born here.

In the outlying centre of Dhrönchen on the river Kleine Dhron, Stefan Andres, a well known German writer, was born.

In 1991, the Trittenheim Wine Queen, Lydia Bollig, was chosen as the 1991-92 German Wine Queen.

In 1999, the Trittenheim winemakers found no wine queen and instead made Togbui Ngoryifia Kosi Olatidoye Céphas Bansah – or Céphas Bansah for short – a king of 200,000 of the Ewe people in Ghana, who lives in Germany, the first and only Wine King. He runs an automotive workshop in Ludwigshafen and governs his people by fax and email, even as he visits them quite often.
