= Naurath =

Naurath may refer to two places in Rhineland-Palatinate, Germany:

- Naurath (Eifel), north of the Moselle river
- Naurath (Wald), south of the Moselle river
