= Retterath =

- Municipality
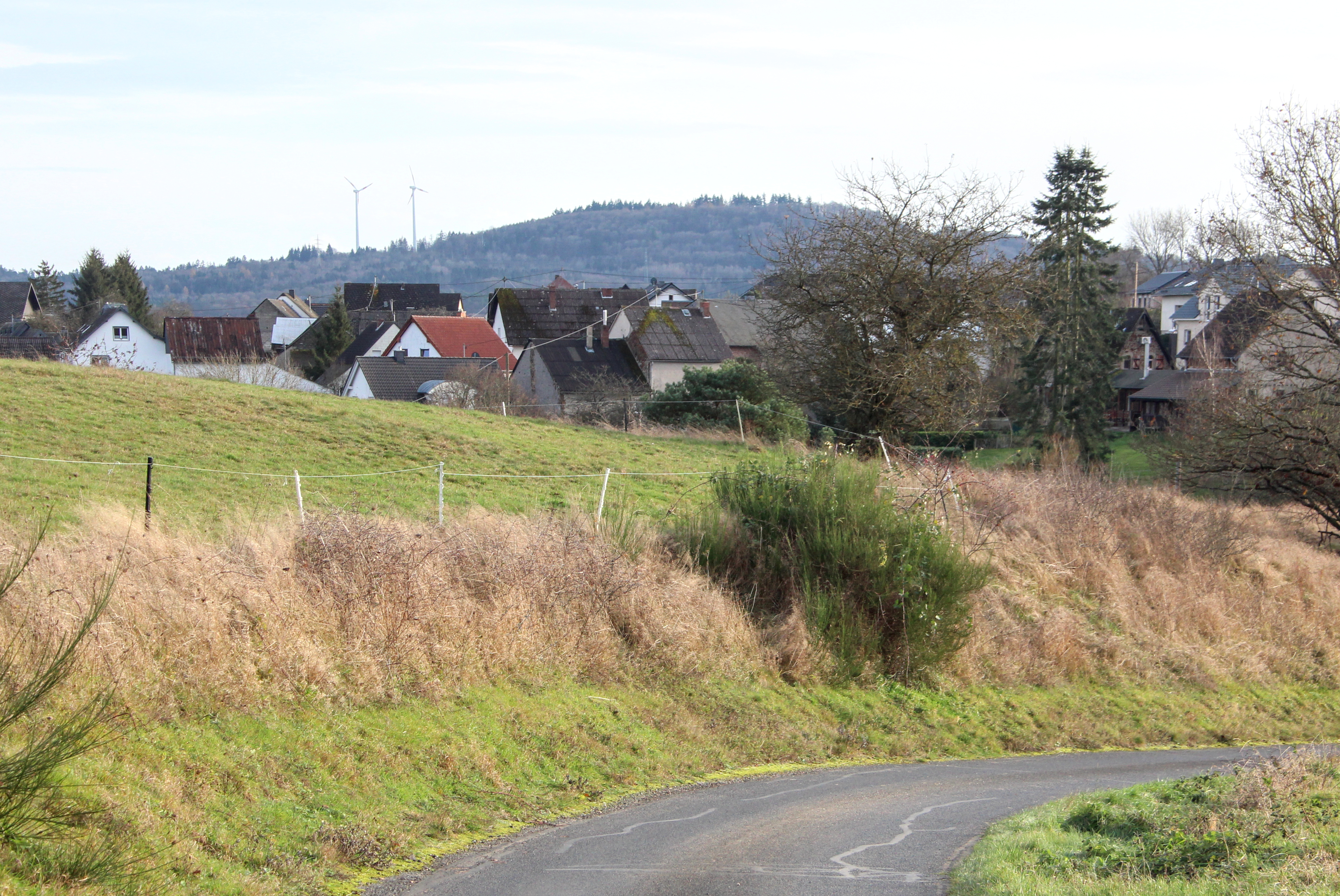

- Coat of arms

- Location of Retterath within Vulkaneifel district
- Interactive map of Retterath
- Location within Germany Location within Rhineland-Palatinate
- Coordinates: 50°16′19.24″N 7°0′55.60″E
- Country: Germany
- State: Rhineland-Palatinate
- District: Vulkaneifel
- Municipal assoc.: Kelberg

Government
  - Mayor (2019–24): Eckhard Kamenz

Area
  - Total: 5.50 km^{2} (2.12 sq mi)
- Elevation: 445 m (1,460 ft)

Population (2025-12-31)
  - Total: 311
  - Density: 56.5/km^{2} (146/sq mi)
- Time zone: UTC+01:00 (CET)
  - Summer (DST): UTC+02:00 (CEST)
- Postal codes: 56769
- Dialling codes: 02657
- Vehicle registration: DAU

Retterath is an Ortsgemeinde – a municipality belonging to a Verbandsgemeinde, a kind of collective municipality – in the Vulkaneifel district in Rhineland-Palatinate, Germany. It belongs to the Verbandsgemeinde of Kelberg, whose seat is in the like-named municipality.

== Geography ==
The municipality lies in the Vulkaneifel, a part of the Eifel known for its volcanic history, geographical and geological features, and even ongoing activity today, including gases that sometimes well up from the earth.

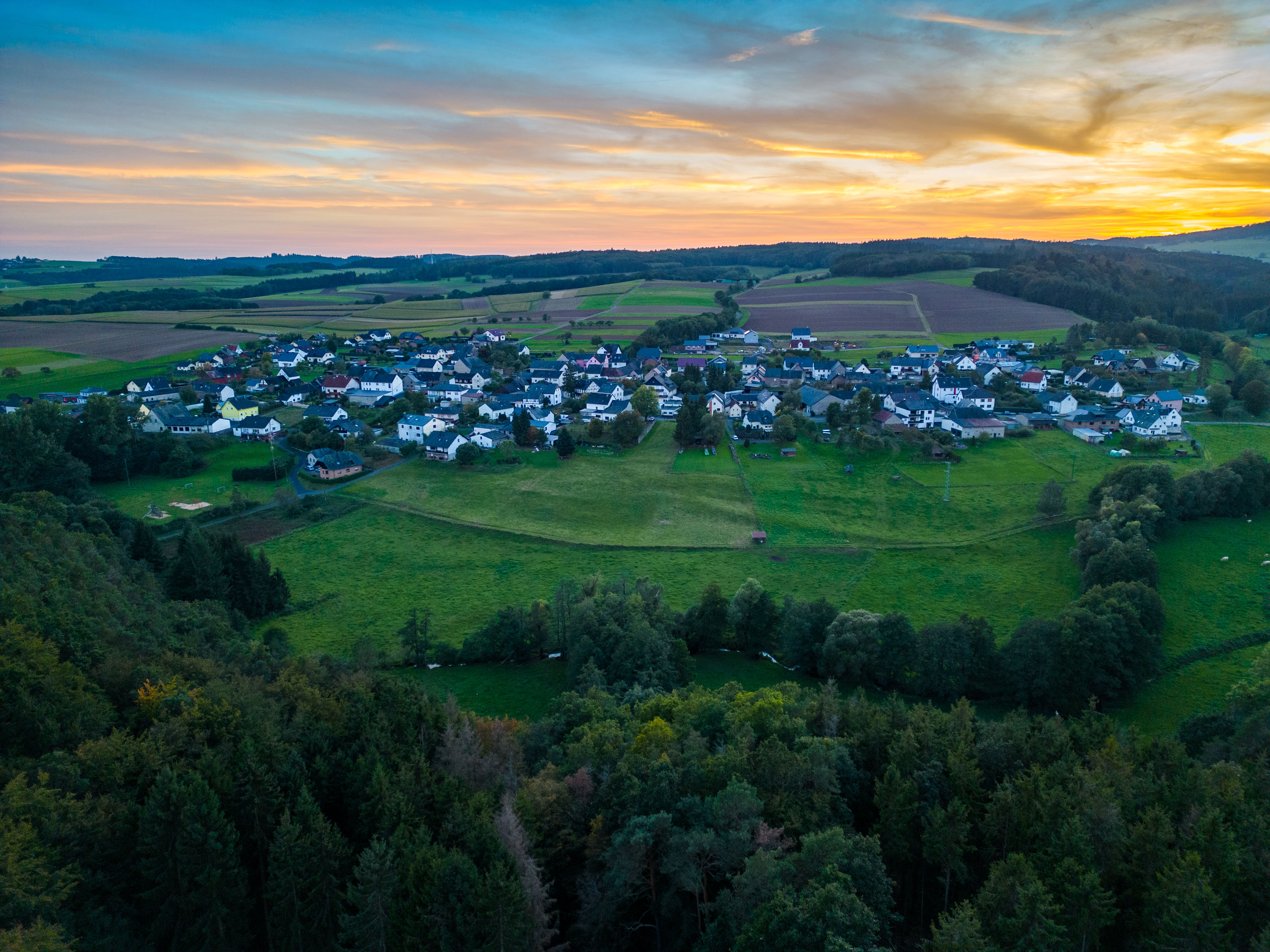
Village of Retterath in Germany

== History ==
In 954, Retterath had its first documentary mention in some documents from Archbishop of Trier Ruotbert (died 956). From the Middle Ages until the late 18th century, Retterath belonged to the County of Virneburg.

Up above Retterath runs a hiking trail around the Hochkelberg. The twelve-kilometre-long path leads by places that are steeped in both history and blood. In the village, there was on Electoral-Trier-held lands a Virneburg high court occupied by 3 Heimburgen – roughly equivalent to “mayors” – from Retterath, Mannebach and Lirstal and 7 Schöffen (roughly “lay jurists”), according to a Weistum from 1468 (a Weistum – cognate with English wisdom – was a legal pronouncement issued by men learned in law in the Middle Ages and early modern times). The reconstructed gallows remind one that this County of Virneburg blood court held its executions here in the woods. The condemned were not only hanged from the gallows, but also, according to each one's sentence, broken on the wheel, drawn and quartered or beheaded. A stone's throw from the gallows lies the Grüner Weiher, a pond where once women who had killed their child were drowned. In those days, women were also deemed guilty if they had become pregnant by rape or if they were too poor to raise their child.

In 1809, the village had, together with Arbach and Salcherath, its own municipal area. Under Prussian administration, Retterath was a municipality in the Bürgermeisterei (“Mayoralty”) of Kelberg in the Adenau district.

In the 1820s, a killer was on the loose around Retterath. Five people fell victim to the one-armed fiend who throughout the region was known simply as Stumpfarm – “Stump-Arm”.

In the course of administrative restructuring in Rhineland-Palatinate in 1970, the municipality, along with the others in the Amt of Kelberg, was assigned to the Daun district, which has since been given the name Vulkaneifel.

== Politics ==
=== Municipal council ===
The council is made up of 8 council members, who were elected by majority vote at the municipal election held on 7 June 2009, and the honorary mayor as chairman.

=== Mayor ===
Retterath's mayor is Eckhard Kamenz.

=== Coat of arms ===
The German blazon reads: Durch Wellenschnitt von Blau über Gold geteilt, oben eine fliegende weiße Taube mit weißem Ölkrug im Schnabel, unten 7 (4:3) rote Rauten balkenweise.

The municipality's arms might in English heraldic language be described thus: Per fess wavy, azure a dove volant bearing an oil jug in its beak argent, and Or seven lozenges gules, four and three.

The municipality's and the church's patron saint is Saint Remigius, whose attribute is the dove bearing an oil jug in its beak, thus explaining the charge above the line of partition. In feudal times, Retterath belonged, as an Electoral-Trier fief, to the County of Virneburg. The charge below the line of partition is from the arms formerly borne by the Counts of Virneburg. An 18th-century court seal from Retterath also bore this device.

== Culture and sightseeing ==
Buildings:

- Saint Remigius’s Catholic Parish Church (Pfarrkirche St. Remigius), Kirchstraße – Gothic Revival basilica of slate quarrystone, 1862; churchyard/missionary cross from 1841.
- At Brunnenstraße 1 – plastered building, apparently from 1880.
- Hauptstraße 18 – one-and-a-half-floor timber-frame house, partly solid, from 18th century (?).
- Hauptstraße 27 a – timber-frame house, partly solid, left half possibly from 18th century, right half newer.
- Hauptstraße/corner of Lindenstraße – wayside cross, basalt shaft cross from 1751.
- Kirchstraße 1 – timber-frame house, partly solid or slated, latter half of 19th century.
- Kirchstraße 8 a – solid house from 1743.
- Lindenstraße/corner of Hauptstraße – wayside cross, basalt shaft cross from 1748.
