= Fell, Rhineland-Palatinate =

Fell
- Municipality
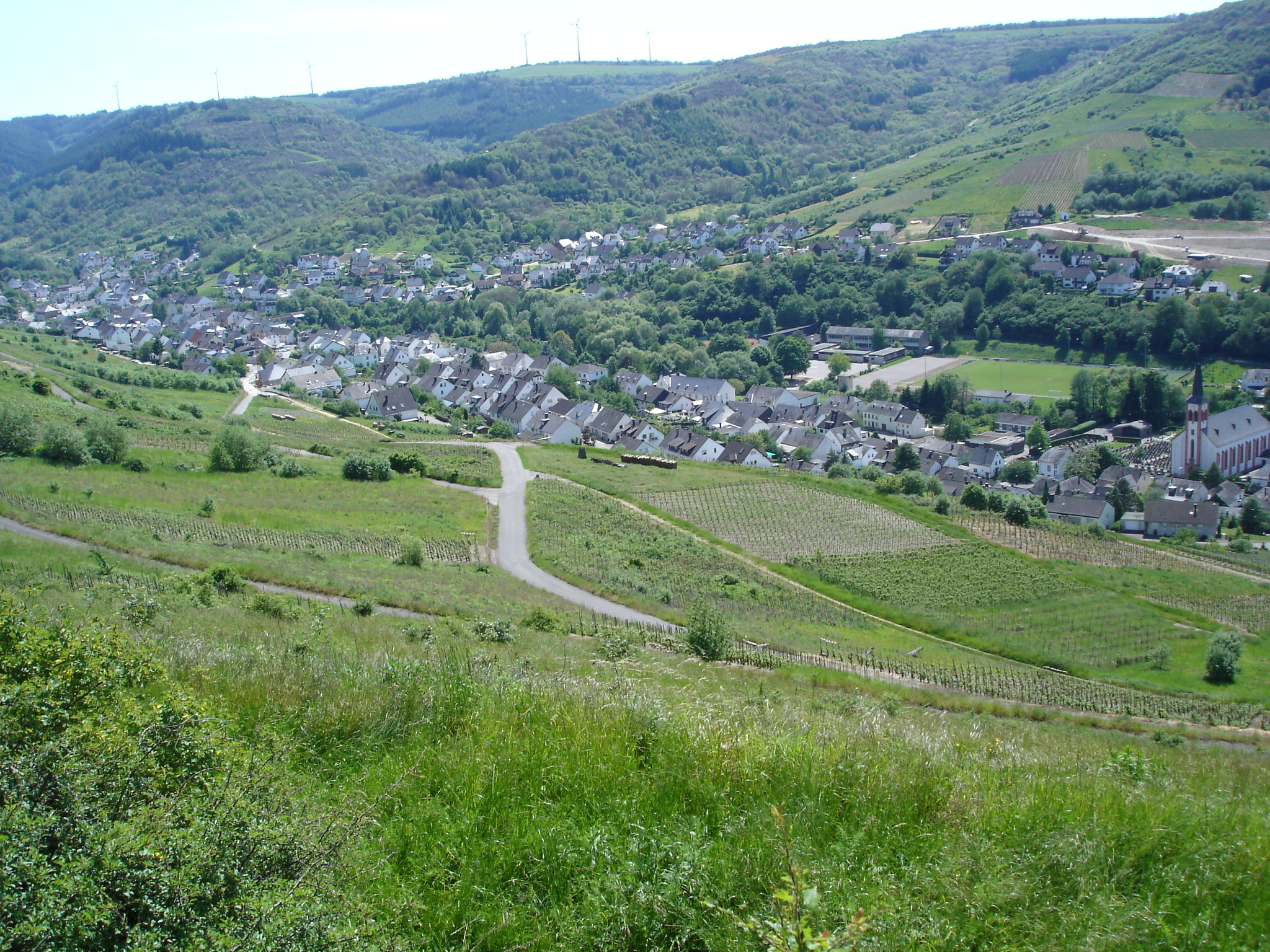

- Coat of arms

- Location of Fell within Trier-Saarburg district
- Interactive map of Fell
- Location within Germany Location within Rhineland-Palatinate
- Coordinates: 49°46′29″N 6°46′48″E
- Country: Germany
- State: Rhineland-Palatinate
- District: Trier-Saarburg
- Municipal assoc.: Schweich an der Römischen Weinstraße

Government
  - Mayor (2019–24): Alfons Rodens (CDU)

Area
  - Total: 15.73 km^{2} (6.07 sq mi)
- Elevation: 165 m (541 ft)

Population (2025-12-31)
  - Total: 2,332
  - Density: 148.3/km^{2} (384.0/sq mi)
- Time zone: UTC+01:00 (CET)
  - Summer (DST): UTC+02:00 (CEST)
- Postal codes: 54341
- Dialling codes: 06502
- Vehicle registration: TR

Fell (German pronunciation: [fɛl]) is a municipality in the Trier-Saarburg district of Rhineland-Palatinate, Germany.

Near Fell there is the Slate mine Fell and the Feller Bach, a tributary of the river Moselle.
