= Lirstal =

- Municipality
- Coat of arms

- Location of Lirstal within Vulkaneifel district
- Interactive map of Lirstal
- Location within Germany Location within Rhineland-Palatinate
- Coordinates: 50°15′25″N 7°02′18″E
- Country: Germany
- State: Rhineland-Palatinate
- District: Vulkaneifel
- Municipal assoc.: Kelberg

Government
  - Mayor (2019–24): Dirk Grombein

Area
  - Total: 5.26 km^{2} (2.03 sq mi)
- Elevation: 400 m (1,300 ft)

Population (2025-12-31)
  - Total: 202
  - Density: 38.4/km^{2} (99.5/sq mi)
- Time zone: UTC+01:00 (CET)
  - Summer (DST): UTC+02:00 (CEST)
- Postal codes: 56767
- Dialling codes: 02657
- Vehicle registration: DAU
- Website: www.lirstal-eifel.de

Lirstal is an Ortsgemeinde – a municipality belonging to a Verbandsgemeinde, a kind of collective municipality – in the Vulkaneifel district in Rhineland-Palatinate, Germany. It belongs to the Verbandsgemeinde of Kelberg, whose seat is in the like-named municipality.

== Geography ==
The municipality lies in the Vulkaneifel, a part of the Eifel known for its volcanic history, geographical and geological features, and even ongoing activity today, including gases that sometimes well up from the earth.

== History ==
In 1336, Lirstal had its first documentary mention. At that time, the village was called Leppelzal. The name has been written many different ways over the centuries since then, as shown in this table:

Year	Spelling	Year	Spelling
1336	Leppelzal	1724	Lyrstall
1348	Lerstal	1724	Lyhrstall
1553	Lirstall	1776	Lueschtal
1555	Lerstall	1780	Lehrstahl
1559	Lersthaill	before 1789	Lirstahl
1595	Lierstail	1790	Lurschthal
1631	Lierßdall	1809	Liersthal
1632	Lierstal	1810	Liersdahl
1680	Lirefelt	1840	Liersthal
1689	Lierefeldt	about 1890	Lierstall
1705	Liehstall	since 1966	Lirstal

The name underwent its last change in spelling, from “Lierstall” to “Lirstal”, on 23 November 1966, mainly to thwart vandals who kept altering the signposts and other public notices that bore the old spelling – in a most uncomplimentary way.

Lirstal belonged from the beginning until 1794 to the County of Virneburg.

== Politics ==
=== Municipal council ===
The council is made up of 6 council members, who were elected by proportional representation at the municipal election held on 7 June 2009, and the honorary mayor as chairman. The six seats are shared among three voters’ groups. The last election in 2004 had been done by majority vote.

=== Mayor ===
Lirstal’s mayor is Dirk Grombein, and his deputies are Dorothea Pomerlan and Manfred Kutscheid.

=== Coat of arms ===
The German blazon reads: Von Gold über Rot geteilt, oben 7 (4:3) zu zwei Balken aneinandergereihte rote Rauten, unten ein schrägrechtes gewendetes, silbernes Schwert mit goldenem Griff.

The municipality’s arms might in English heraldic language be described thus: Per fess Or seven lozenges gules, four and three, and gules a sword bendwise argent hilted of the first.

The pattern above the line of partition is the Virneburg lozenges, once borne as an armorial charge by the Counts of Virneburg. The old chapel, which burnt down in 1825, had as its patron saint Martin, whose attribute is a sword. This is borne as a charge below the line of partition.

There is a legend telling of the reason for the inclusion of the Virneburg lozenges in Lirstal’s arms. According to this story, one of the Counts of Virneburg was an inveterate card player, and during one game – with the Bishop, no less – he won the parish of Retterath. The winning card that he laid was the seven of diamonds, explaining why the charge was chosen for inclusion in the Count’s arms, as a mark of good luck.

As a former part of the County of Virneburg, Lirstal now bears this same charge in its arms.

== Culture and sightseeing ==
Buildings:

- Catholic church, Hauptstraße, triaxial aisleless church from about 1952.
- Wayside cross, south of the village on the road to Laubach, basalt beam cross from 1776 (copy?).
