= Platten, Germany =

Platten
- Municipality
- Coat of arms

- Location of Platten within Bernkastel-Wittlich district
- Interactive map of Platten
- Location within Germany Location within Rhineland-Palatinate
- Coordinates: 49°57′08″N 6°57′17″E
- Country: Germany
- State: Rhineland-Palatinate
- District: Bernkastel-Wittlich
- Municipal assoc.: Wittlich-Land

Government
  - Mayor (2019–24): Jürgen Jakoby

Area
  - Total: 6.63 km^{2} (2.56 sq mi)
- Elevation: 130 m (430 ft)

Population (2025-12-31)
  - Total: 872
  - Density: 132/km^{2} (341/sq mi)
- Time zone: UTC+01:00 (CET)
  - Summer (DST): UTC+02:00 (CEST)
- Postal codes: 54518
- Dialling codes: 06535
- Vehicle registration: WIL
- Website: www.weinort-platten.de

Platten (German pronunciation: [ˈplatn̩]) is an Ortsgemeinde – a municipality belonging to a Verbandsgemeinde, a kind of collective municipality – in the Bernkastel-Wittlich district in Rhineland-Palatinate, Germany.

== Geography ==
The municipality lies on the river Lieser in a side valley of the Moselle. The nearest middle centres are Wittlich and Bernkastel-Kues. Platten belongs to the Verbandsgemeinde of Wittlich-Land, whose seat is in Wittlich, although that town is itself not in the Verbandsgemeinde.

== History ==
In 1084, Platten had its first documentary mention as villa Platana. Beginning in 1794, Platten lay under French rule. In 1814 it was assigned to the Kingdom of Prussia at the Congress of Vienna. Since 1947, it has been part of the then newly founded state of Rhineland-Palatinate.

== Politics ==
=== Municipal council ===
The council is made up of 12 council members, who were elected by proportional representation at the municipal election held on 7 June 2009, and the honorary mayor as chairman:

Year	WG Kuhnen	WG Marx	Total
2009	8	4	12 seats

=== Coat of arms ===
The German blazon reads: Im silbernen Schildhaupt ein rotes Balkenkreuz, darunter in Blau ein silberner Schrägbalken, belegt mit drei goldenbesamten, fünfblättrigen, roten Rosen. In Blau oben ein silberner Forsthaken.

The municipality’s arms might in English heraldic language be described thus: Azure a bend argent charged with three roses gules seeded Or, above which a cramp palewise of the second, in a chief of the second a cross of the third.

The red cross in the chief is the armorial bearing once borne by the Electorate of Trier, which was once the village’s landholder. The bend (slanted stripe) charged with the three roses is the arms borne by the noble family “von Platten”, also known as “Haich von Platten”, whose seat was Castle Neuerburg near Wittlich. This composition is handed down through Paul von Platten’s seal (from 1390) and a colour drawing in Archbishop Balduin’s book of documents, the so-called Balduineum, for Richard von Platten, who in 1326 was enfeoffed with Castle Neuerburg by this Archbishop. The cramp (double-ended hook, called a Forsthaken, or “forest hook”, in the German blazon, but often called a Wolfsangel, or “wolf’s hook”, in blazons for other German coats of arms that bear this charge) came from the arms borne by the noble family Plait (or Platten), whose ancestral seat was in Platten and who, owing to their holdings in Longuich sometimes called themselves “Plait von Longuich”. The family’s male line died out in the late 16th century with Gerhard Plait von Longuich’s death.
