= Schweich an der Römischen Weinstraße =

- Verbandsgemeinde
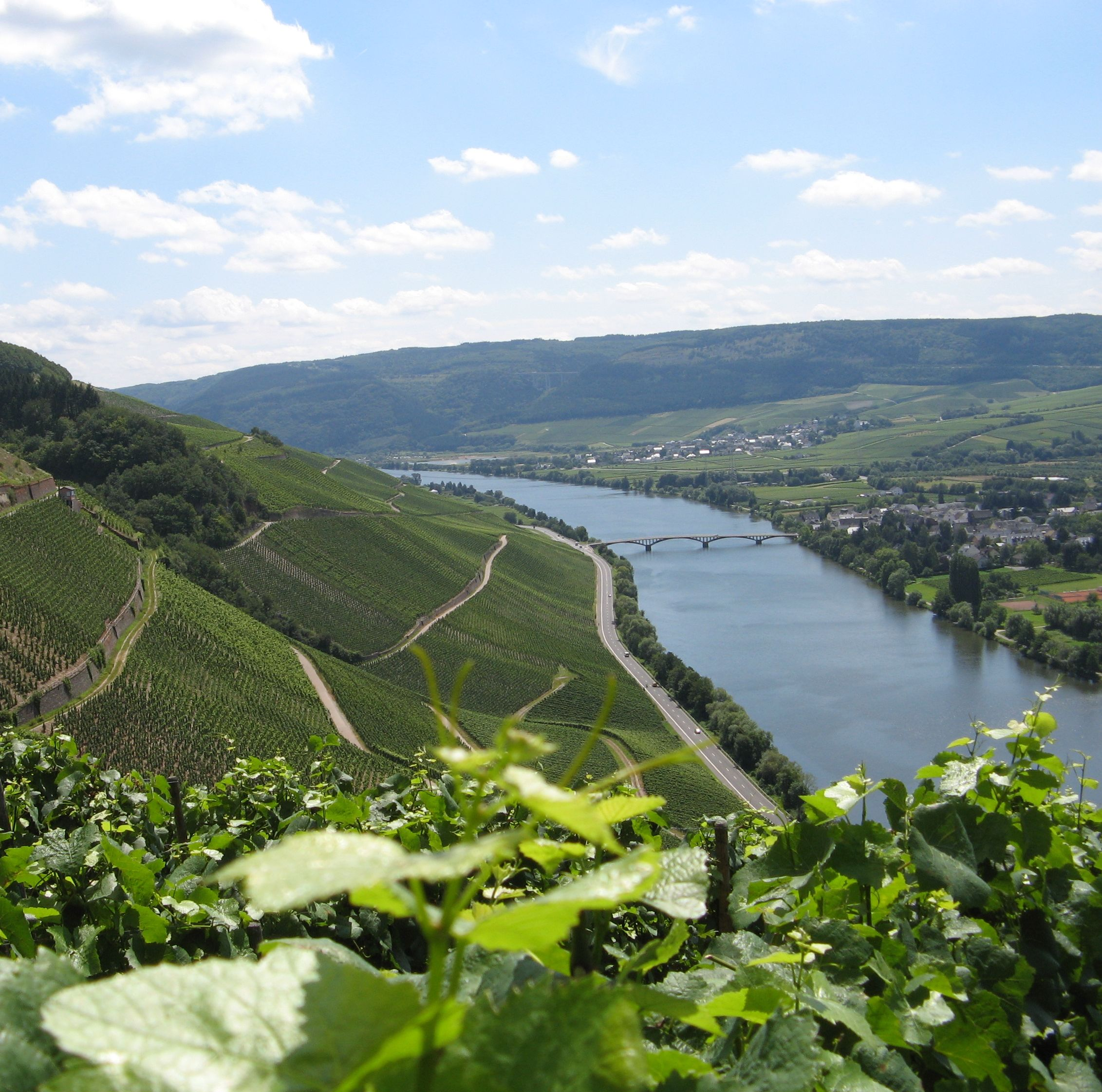
- Schweicher Annaberg at the Moselle

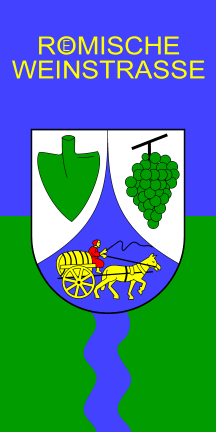
- Flag Coat of arms

- Location of Schweich an der Römischen Weinstraße in the district
- Interactive map of Schweich an der Römischen Weinstraße
- Location within Germany Location within Rhineland-Palatinate
- Coordinates: 49°49′10.42″N 6°45′7.98″E
- Country: Germany
- State: Rhineland-Palatinate
- District: Trier-Saarburg
- Founded: 1968
- Subdivisions: 19 Municipalities

Government
  - Mayor (2019–27): Christiane Horsch (CDU)

Area
  - Total: 164.45 km^{2} (63.49 sq mi)

Population (2025-12-31)
  - Total: 28,525
  - Density: 173.46/km^{2} (449.25/sq mi)
- Time zone: UTC+01:00 (CET)
  - Summer (DST): UTC+02:00 (CEST)
- Vehicle registration: TR, SAB
- Website: www.schweich.de

Schweich an der Römischen Weinstraße is a Verbandsgemeinde ("collective municipality") in the Trier-Saarburg district, in Rhineland-Palatinate, Germany.

It is located in the northeast of Trier and consists of the town of Schweich on the Moselle and the 18 Ortsgemeinden ("local municipalities") of Bekond, Detzem, Ensch, Fell, Föhren, Kenn, Klüsserath, Köwerich, Leiwen, Longen, Longuich, Mehring, Naurath, Pölich, Riol, Schleich, Thörnich and Trittenheim.

== Geography ==
The elevation of the Verbandsgemeinde extends from 114 m above sea level (NHN) on the Moselle near Trittenheim to 493 m above NHN near Mehring.

=== Neighbouring collective municipalities ===
Neighboring collective municipalities are (starting clockwise in the north):

- Verbandsgemeinde Wittlich-Land
- Verbandsgemeinde Bernkastel-Kues
- Verbandsgemeinde Thalfang am Erbeskopf
- Verbandsgemeinde Hermeskeil
- Verbandsgemeinde Ruwer
- Stadt Trier
- Verbandsgemeinde Trier-Land

=== Associated municipalities ===
The list contains the coats of arms, the municipality names, the district areas, exemplarily the population figures from 1950 as well as the current population figures.

Municipality	Area (km²)	Population (1950)	Population (December 31, 2019)
Bekond	3.81	591	981
Detzem	5.56	658	601
Ensch	6.83	532	447
Fell	15.73	1,843	2332
Föhren	9.79	1,903	3041
Kenn	3.88	960	2924
Klüsserath	11.70	1,239	1141
Köwerich	2.31	375	384
Leiwen	12.71	1,360	1623
Longen	0.97	135	122
Longuich	8.82	1,069	1283
Mehring	22.37	1,774	2351
Naurath (Eifel)	5.18	367	331
Pölich	3.20	331	438
Riol	6.31	688	1332
Schleich	1.59	225	238
Schweich	31.09	4,597	7663
Thörnich	2.49	229	228
Trittenheim	10.10	1,389	1065
VG Schweich an der Röm. Weinstr.	164.50	20,265	28525

== History ==
The Verbandsgemeinde Schweich was created by the state law amending municipal constitutional regulations and preparing the reorganization of the municipalities of July 16, 1968, which determined the reorganization of the previous offices into Verbandsgemeinden. The Verbandsgemeinde Klüsserath was dissolved in the course of the territorial reform carried out by the State of Rhineland-Palatinate in 1969/1970 and the local municipalities of Klüsserath, Leiwen, Köwerich, Detzem, Thörnich, Ensch, Schleich, Pölich and Bekond became part of the Verbandsgemeinde Schweich. The officially awarded additional designation "an der Römischen Weinstraße" has been used since January 1, 1989. On January 1, 2012, the municipality of Trittenheim was incorporated. It was previously part of the Verbandsgemeinde Neumagen-Dhron in the Bernkastel-Wittlich district.

=== Population development ===
Year	Inhabitants
1815	9,227
1835	13,655
1871	15,320
1905	16,497
1939	19,015
1950	20,265
1961	21,304
1970	22,729
1987	23,154
1997	24,962
2005	25,800
2011	26,532
2017	28,075

== Politics ==
=== Verbandsgemeinderat ===
The Verbandsgemeinderat Schweich consists of 36 honorary councillors, who were elected in the local elections on May 26, 2019 by personalized proportional representation, and the full-time mayor as chairwoman.

The distribution of seats in the municipal council:

Election	SPD	CDU	Greens	FWG	Total
2019	8	16	2	10	36 Seats
2014	9	16	–	11	36 Seats
2009	10	15	–	11	36 Seats
2004	10	16	–	10	36 Seats

(FWG = "Freie Wählergruppe der Verbandsgemeinde Schweich e.V.")

=== Mayor ===
- Christiane Horsch, since 2012
- Berthold Biwer, 1996 to 2011
- Harald Bartos, 1985 to 1996
- Bernhard Becker, 1963 to 1985
- Jakob Dedy, 1948 to 1963
- Johannes Grundmanns, 1945 to 1948
- Kurt Friedrich Keuchen, 1937 to 1945
- Hubert Ruland, 1925 to 1937

In the direct election on May 26, 2019, Horsch was confirmed in her office with a share of the vote of 81.3%.

=== Partnership ===
The Verbandsgemeinde maintains partnerships with Portishead, England (since 1992), Murialdo, Italy (since 1995) and Krokowa in Poland (since 1995).
