= Thörnich =

- Municipality
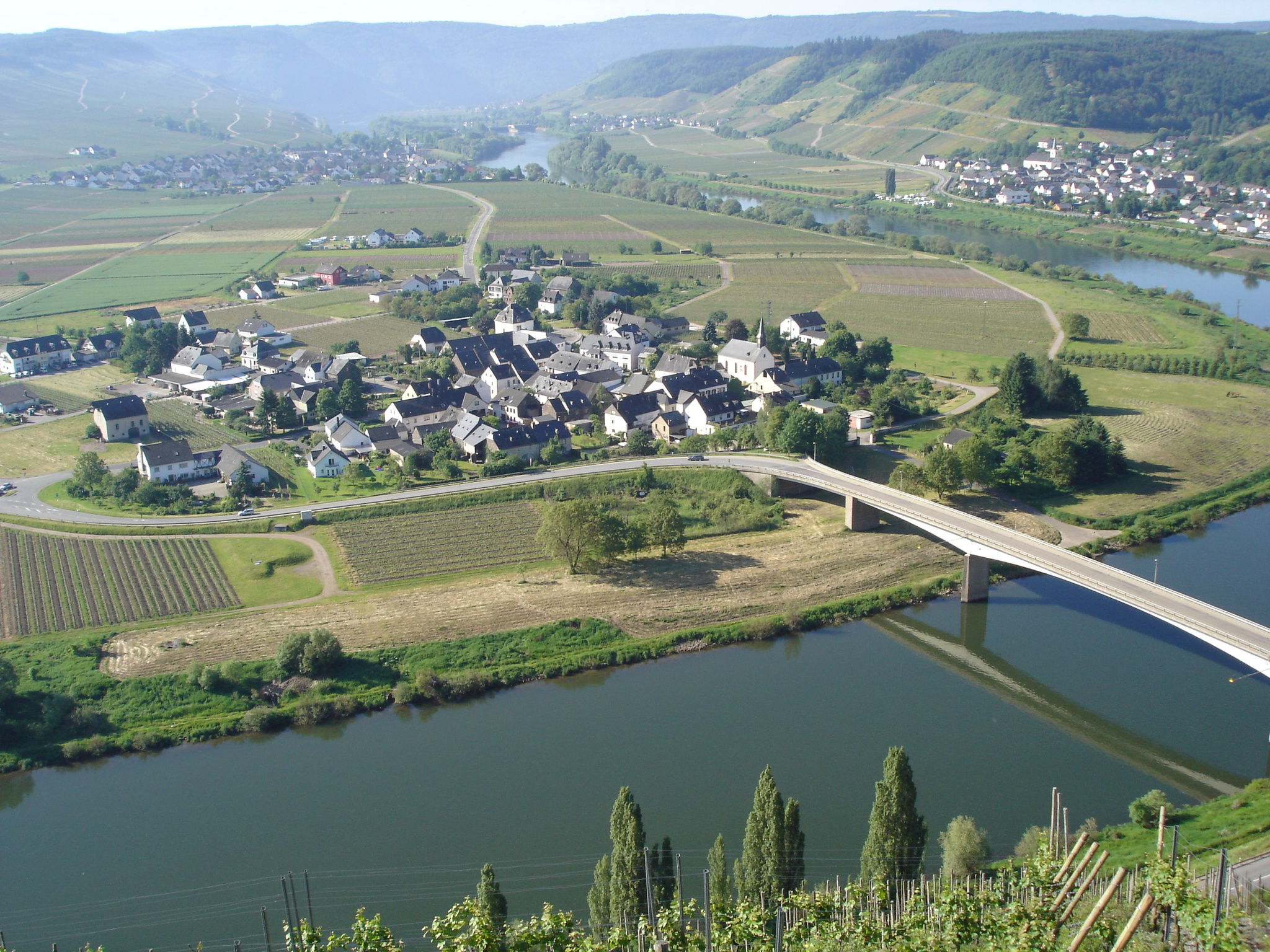

- Coat of arms

- Location of Thörnich within Trier-Saarburg district
- Interactive map of Thörnich
- Location within Germany Location within Rhineland-Palatinate
- Coordinates: 49°50′2″N 6°50′20″E
- Country: Germany
- State: Rhineland-Palatinate
- District: Trier-Saarburg
- Municipal assoc.: Schweich an der Römischen Weinstraße

Government
  - Mayor (2019–24): Hans-Peter Brixius

Area
  - Total: 2.49 km^{2} (0.96 sq mi)
- Elevation: 127 m (417 ft)

Population (2025-12-31)
  - Total: 228
  - Density: 91.6/km^{2} (237/sq mi)
- Time zone: UTC+01:00 (CET)
  - Summer (DST): UTC+02:00 (CEST)
- Postal codes: 54340
- Dialling codes: 06507
- Vehicle registration: TR
- Website: www.schweich.de

Thörnich is a municipality in the Trier-Saarburg district, in Rhineland-Palatinate, Germany.
