= Bekond =

- Municipality
- Coat of arms

- Location of Bekond within Trier-Saarburg district
- Interactive map of Bekond
- Location within Germany Location within Rhineland-Palatinate
- Coordinates: 49°50′57″N 6°48′2″E
- Country: Germany
- State: Rhineland-Palatinate
- District: Trier-Saarburg
- Municipal assoc.: Schweich an der Römischen Weinstraße

Government
  - Mayor (2019–24): Andreas Müller

Area
  - Total: 3.81 km^{2} (1.47 sq mi)
- Elevation: 220 m (720 ft)

Population (2025-12-31)
  - Total: 981
  - Density: 257/km^{2} (667/sq mi)
- Time zone: UTC+01:00 (CET)
  - Summer (DST): UTC+02:00 (CEST)
- Postal codes: 54340
- Dialling codes: 06502
- Vehicle registration: TR
- Website: www.bekond.de

Bekond is a municipality in the Trier-Saarburg district, in Rhineland-Palatinate, Germany.
