= Schleich, Germany =

Schleich
- Municipality
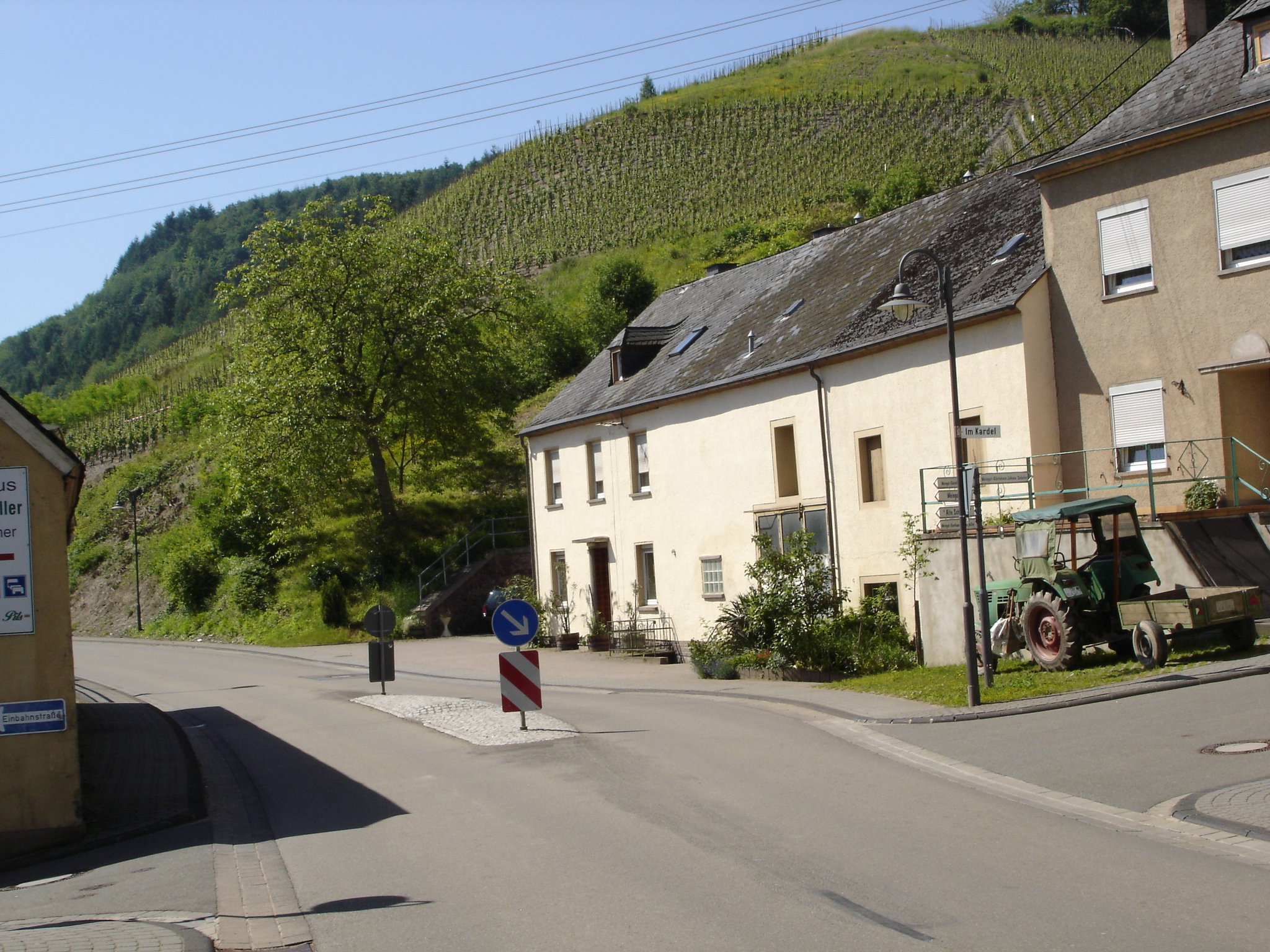

- Coat of arms

- Location of Schleich within Trier-Saarburg district
- Interactive map of Schleich
- Location within Germany Location within Rhineland-Palatinate
- Coordinates: 49°48′47″N 6°50′28″E
- Country: Germany
- State: Rhineland-Palatinate
- District: Trier-Saarburg
- Municipal assoc.: Schweich an der Römischen Weinstraße

Government
  - Mayor (2019–24): Rudolf Körner

Area
  - Total: 1.59 km^{2} (0.61 sq mi)
- Elevation: 125 m (410 ft)

Population (2025-12-31)
  - Total: 238
  - Density: 150/km^{2} (388/sq mi)
- Time zone: UTC+01:00 (CET)
  - Summer (DST): UTC+02:00 (CEST)
- Postal codes: 54340
- Dialling codes: 06507
- Vehicle registration: TR
- Website: www.schweich.de

Schleich is a municipality in the Trier-Saarburg district, in Rhineland-Palatinate, Germany.
