= Klüsserath =

- Municipality
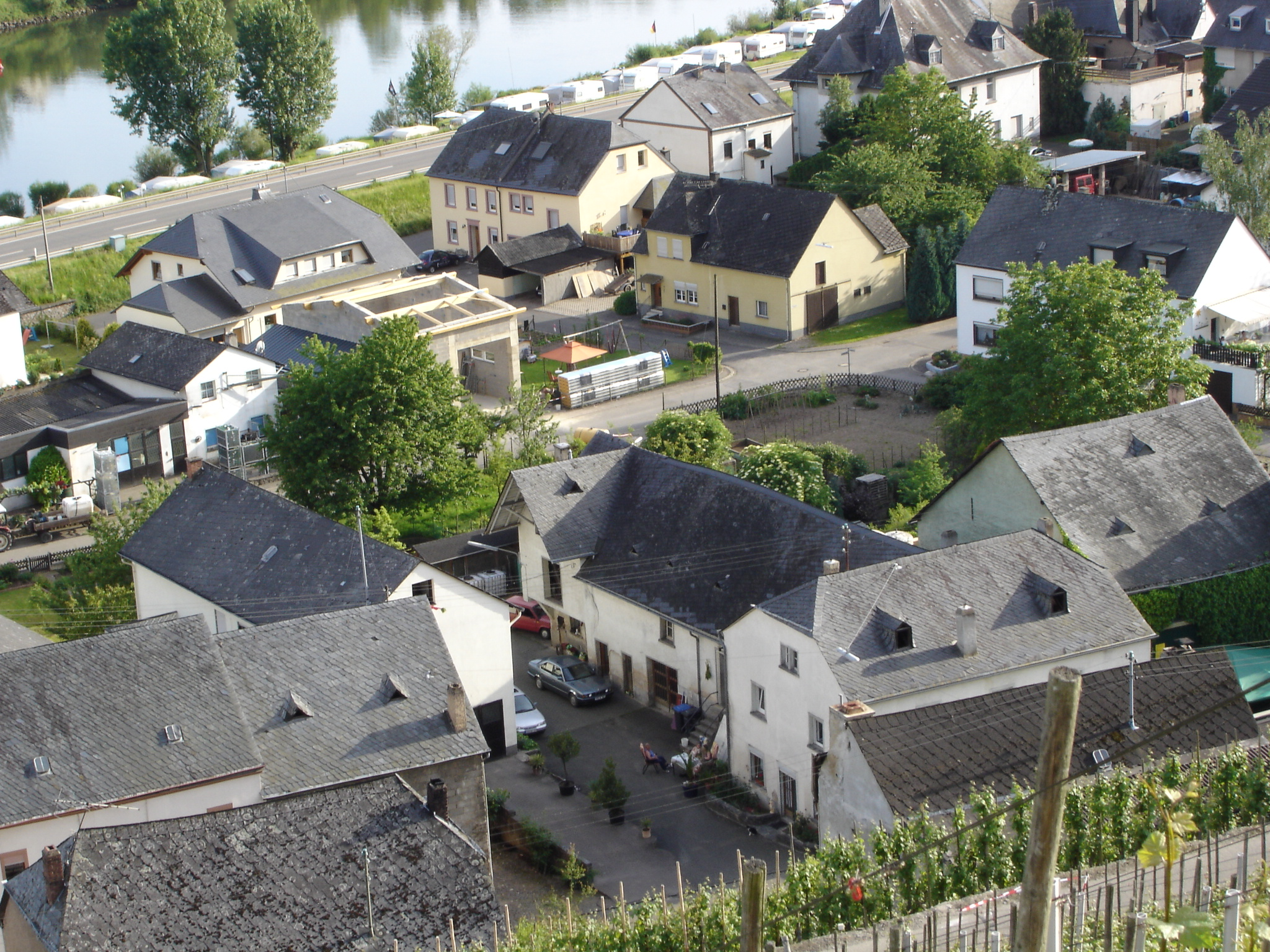

- Coat of arms

- Location of Klüsserath within Trier-Saarburg district
- Interactive map of Klüsserath
- Location within Germany Location within Rhineland-Palatinate
- Coordinates: 49°50′39″N 6°51′14″E
- Country: Germany
- State: Rhineland-Palatinate
- District: Trier-Saarburg
- Municipal assoc.: Schweich an der Römischen Weinstraße

Government
  - Mayor (2019–24): Norbert Friedrich

Area
  - Total: 11.70 km^{2} (4.52 sq mi)
- Elevation: 120 m (390 ft)

Population (2025-12-31)
  - Total: 1,141
  - Density: 97.52/km^{2} (252.6/sq mi)
- Time zone: UTC+01:00 (CET)
  - Summer (DST): UTC+02:00 (CEST)
- Postal codes: 54340
- Dialling codes: 06507
- Vehicle registration: TR
- Website: www.kluesserath.de

Klüsserath is a commune of the Verbandsgemeinde Schweich an der Römischen Weinstraße in the district Trier-Saarburg in Rhineland-Palatinate in Germany, on the river Moselle between Bernkastel-Kues and Trier.

== Geography ==
=== Location ===
Located in a wide, natural amphitheater of the Moselle valley, the wine of the commune of Klüsserather Bruderschaft (confraternatity of Klüsserath) is deemed to be a classical, southward, precipitous vineyard. About 90 hectares of vineyards with up to 83% of acclivity make the site one of the largest contiguous southward slopes at the Moselle. The commune of Klüsserath - as a classical street village - runs from this undercut slope to the river Moselle a distance of 2 kilometres. The long parallel streets are linked through small alleys. The stretching of Klüsserath has proverbial character: "So lang wie Klüsserath" (As long as Klüsserath).

Near Klüsserath the river Salm flows into the Moselle.

The federal road "B53", formerly known as "Mittelmoselstraße" (Central Moselle Road), runs between the village and the Moselle River on a flood protection embankment, built from 1927 to 1933.

=== Neighboring municipalities ===
Clockwise, beginning in the north; Klüsserath is situated on the eastern border of the district Trier-Saarburg; adjacent is the district Bernkastel-Wittlich:

Rivenich, Klausen (both Verbandsgemeinde Wittlich-Land), Piesport, Neumagen-Dhron, Trittenheim (all Verbandsgemeinde Neumagen-Dhron) (these villages belong to the district Bernkastel-Wittlich); Köwerich, Thörnich, Bekond (Verbandsgemeinde Schweich, district Trier-Saarburg)
