= Arbach =

- Municipality
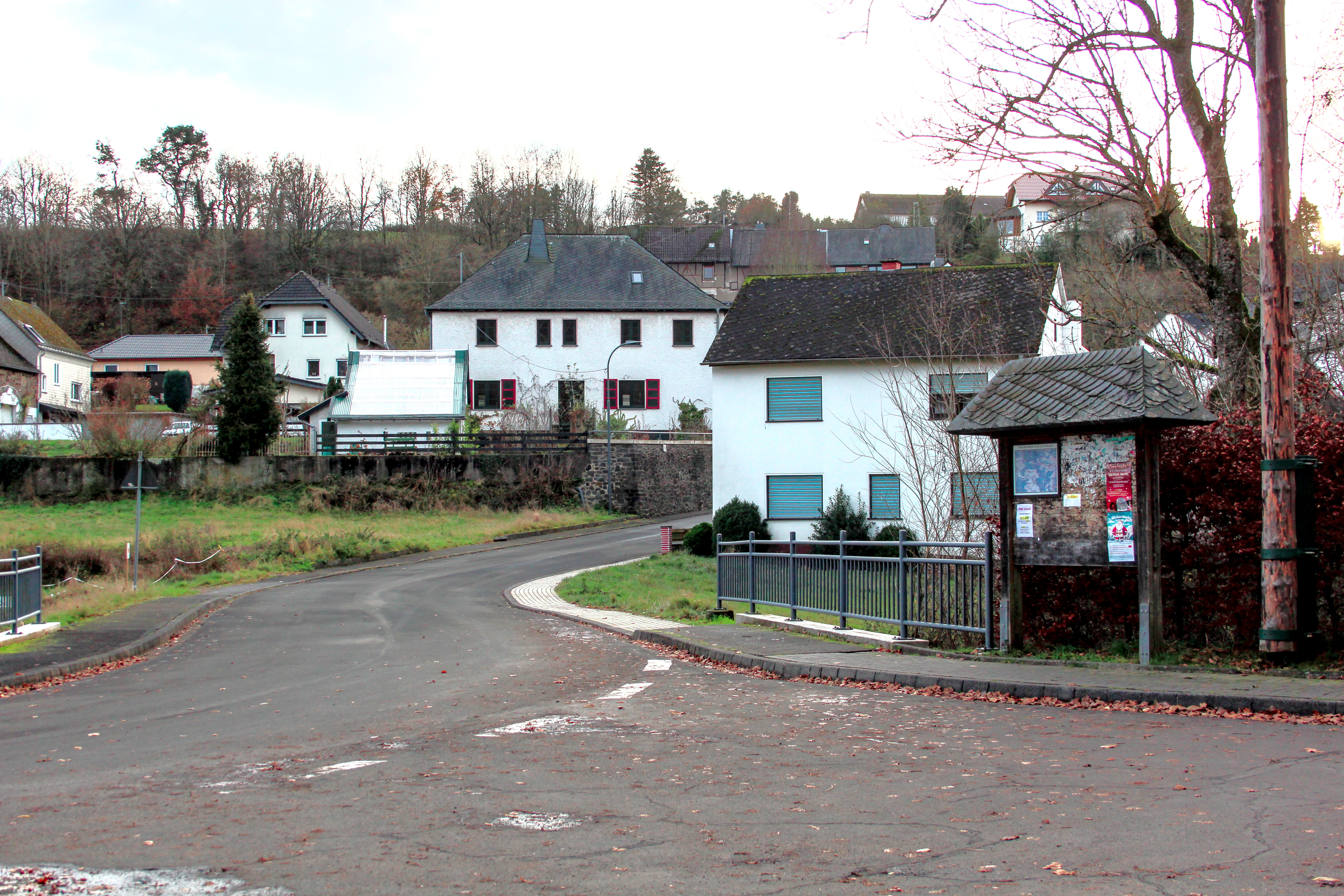

- Coat of arms

- Location of Arbach within Vulkaneifel district
- Interactive map of Arbach
- Location within Germany Location within Rhineland-Palatinate
- Coordinates: 50°17′03″N 7°2′54″E
- Country: Germany
- State: Rhineland-Palatinate
- District: Vulkaneifel
- Municipal assoc.: Kelberg

Government
  - Mayor (2019–24): Uwe Schöne

Area
  - Total: 4.40 km^{2} (1.70 sq mi)
- Elevation: 400 m (1,300 ft)

Population (2025-12-31)
  - Total: 116
  - Density: 26.4/km^{2} (68.3/sq mi)
- Time zone: UTC+01:00 (CET)
  - Summer (DST): UTC+02:00 (CEST)
- Postal codes: 56769
- Dialling codes: 02657
- Vehicle registration: DAU

Arbach is an Ortsgemeinde – a municipality belonging to a Verbandsgemeinde, a kind of collective municipality – in the Vulkaneifel district in Rhineland-Palatinate, Germany. It belongs to the Verbandsgemeinde of Kelberg, whose seat is in the like-named municipality.

== Geography ==
The municipality lies in the Vulkaneifel, a part of the Eifel known for its volcanic history, geographical and geological features, and even ongoing activity today, including gases that sometimes well up from the earth.

== History ==
In 1336, Arbach had its first documentary mention as Arrebarre or Arrebach, in which the prefix Arre – cognate with the English “ear” in the same meaning – referred to ears of cereal grains (this is Ähre in Modern High German).

== Politics ==
=== Municipal council ===
The council is made up of 6 council members, who were elected by majority vote at the municipal election held on 7 June 2009, and the honorary mayor as chairman.

=== Coat of arms ===
The German blazon reads: In Gold, durch einen schrägrechten blauen Wellenbalken geteilt, vorn drei schwarze Getreidehalme, hinten ein rotes durchgehendes Kreuz.

The municipality’s arms might in English heraldic language be described thus: Or a bend wavy azure between three wheat stalks, the one in dexter bent to dexter below the ear and the one in sinister bent to sinister at the ear sable, and a cross gules.

== Culture and sightseeing ==
=== Buildings ===
- Catholic church on Wiesenweg – aisleless church rebuilt in 1952, although possibly incorporating parts of its forerunner from 1766.
- Hauptstraße 5 – residential part of a timber-frame Quereinhaus (a combination residential and commercial house divided for these two purposes down the middle, perpendicularly to the street), with a partly slated roof, reputedly from 1766.
- Hauptstraße 9 – timber-frame house, partly solid, from about 1900.
- Wayside cross – southwest of the village at the municipal limit with Retterath.

=== Natural monuments ===
As in many municipalities in this area that long stood under Napoleonic hegemony, the hundredth anniversary of the liberation from the “Frenchman’s Yoke” was also celebrated here in 1913 with the planting of a so-called Kaiserlinde (“Emperor’s limetree”) in Kaiser Wilhelm II’s honour and the placing of a memorial stone. The stone can still be seen on Schulstraße at the old school.
