= Naurath (Eifel) =

- Municipality
- Coat of arms

- Location of Naurath within Trier-Saarburg district
- Interactive map of Naurath
- Location within Germany Location within Rhineland-Palatinate
- Coordinates: 49°52′50″N 6°44′43″E
- Country: Germany
- State: Rhineland-Palatinate
- District: Trier-Saarburg
- Municipal assoc.: Schweich an der Römischen Weinstraße

Government
  - Mayor (2019–24): Stephan Denis

Area
  - Total: 5.18 km^{2} (2.00 sq mi)
- Elevation: 323 m (1,060 ft)

Population (2025-12-31)
  - Total: 331
  - Density: 63.9/km^{2} (165/sq mi)
- Time zone: UTC+01:00 (CET)
  - Summer (DST): UTC+02:00 (CEST)
- Postal codes: 54340
- Dialling codes: 06508
- Vehicle registration: TR
- Website: Naurath auf der Website der VG Schweich

Naurath (Eifel) (German pronunciation: [ˈnaʊʁaːt]) is a municipality in the Trier-Saarburg district, in Rhineland-Palatinate, Germany.
