= Ensch =

- Municipality
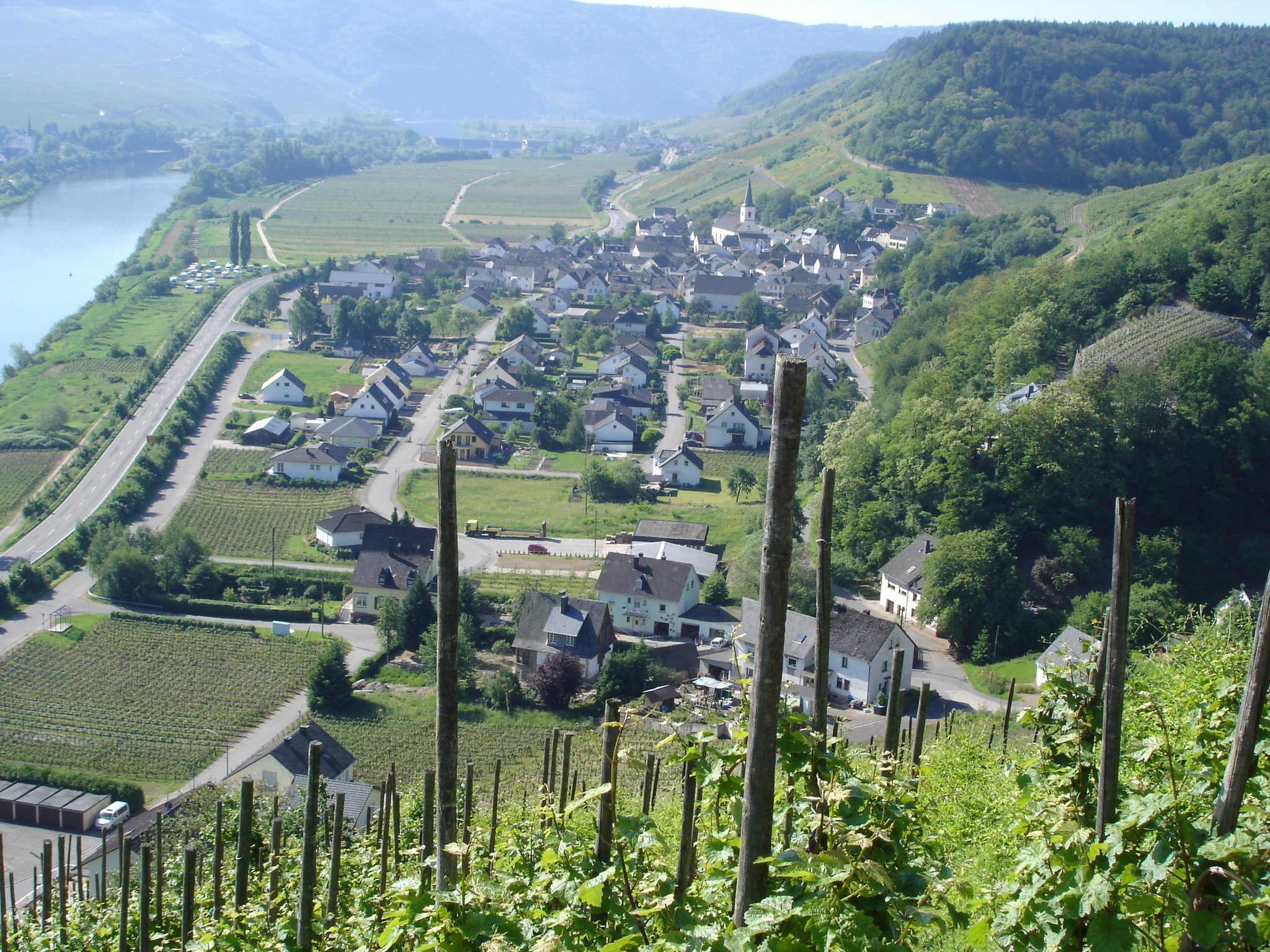

- Coat of arms

- Location of Ensch within Trier-Saarburg district
- Interactive map of Ensch
- Location within Germany Location within Rhineland-Palatinate
- Coordinates: 49°49′36″N 6°50′0″E
- Country: Germany
- State: Rhineland-Palatinate
- District: Trier-Saarburg
- Municipal assoc.: Schweich an der Römischen Weinstraße

Government
  - Mayor (2019–24): Matthias Otto

Area
  - Total: 6.83 km^{2} (2.64 sq mi)
- Elevation: 150 m (490 ft)

Population (2025-12-31)
  - Total: 447
  - Density: 65.4/km^{2} (170/sq mi)
- Time zone: UTC+01:00 (CET)
  - Summer (DST): UTC+02:00 (CEST)
- Postal codes: 54340
- Dialling codes: 06507
- Vehicle registration: TR

Ensch (German pronunciation: [ɛnʃ]) is a municipality in the Trier-Saarburg district, in Rhineland-Palatinate, Germany.
