= Köwerich =

- Municipality
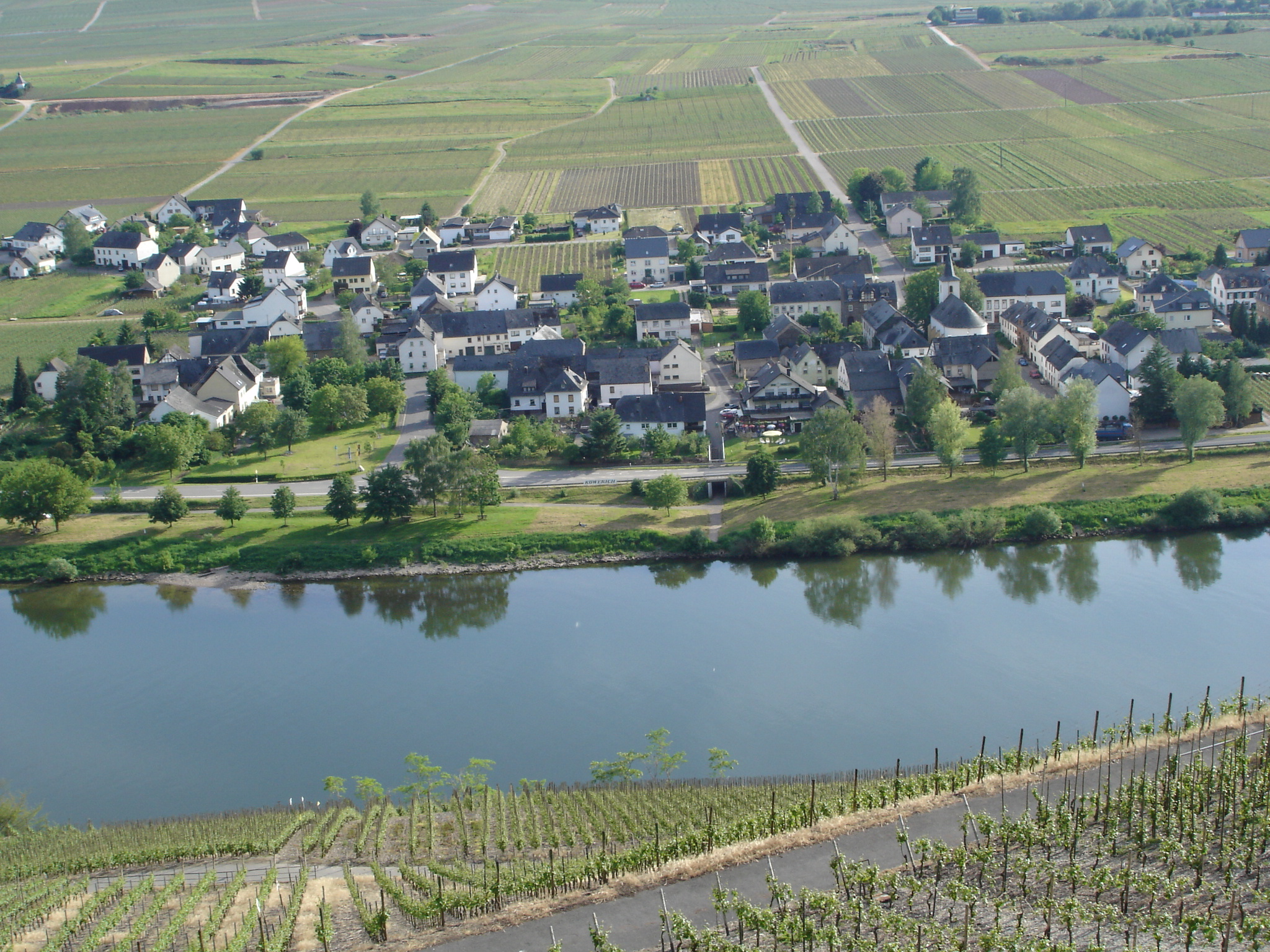

- Coat of arms

- Location of Köwerich within Trier-Saarburg district
- Interactive map of Köwerich
- Location within Germany Location within Rhineland-Palatinate
- Coordinates: 49°50′26″N 6°52′18″E
- Country: Germany
- State: Rhineland-Palatinate
- District: Trier-Saarburg
- Municipal assoc.: Schweich an der Römischen Weinstraße

Government
  - Mayor (2019–24): Elmar Schlöder

Area
  - Total: 2.31 km^{2} (0.89 sq mi)
- Elevation: 145 m (476 ft)

Population (2025-12-31)
  - Total: 384
  - Density: 166/km^{2} (431/sq mi)
- Time zone: UTC+01:00 (CET)
  - Summer (DST): UTC+02:00 (CEST)
- Postal codes: 54340
- Dialling codes: 06507
- Vehicle registration: TR
- Website: www.koewerich.com

Köwerich is a municipality in the Trier-Saarburg district, in Rhineland-Palatinate, Germany.
