= Pölich =

- Municipality
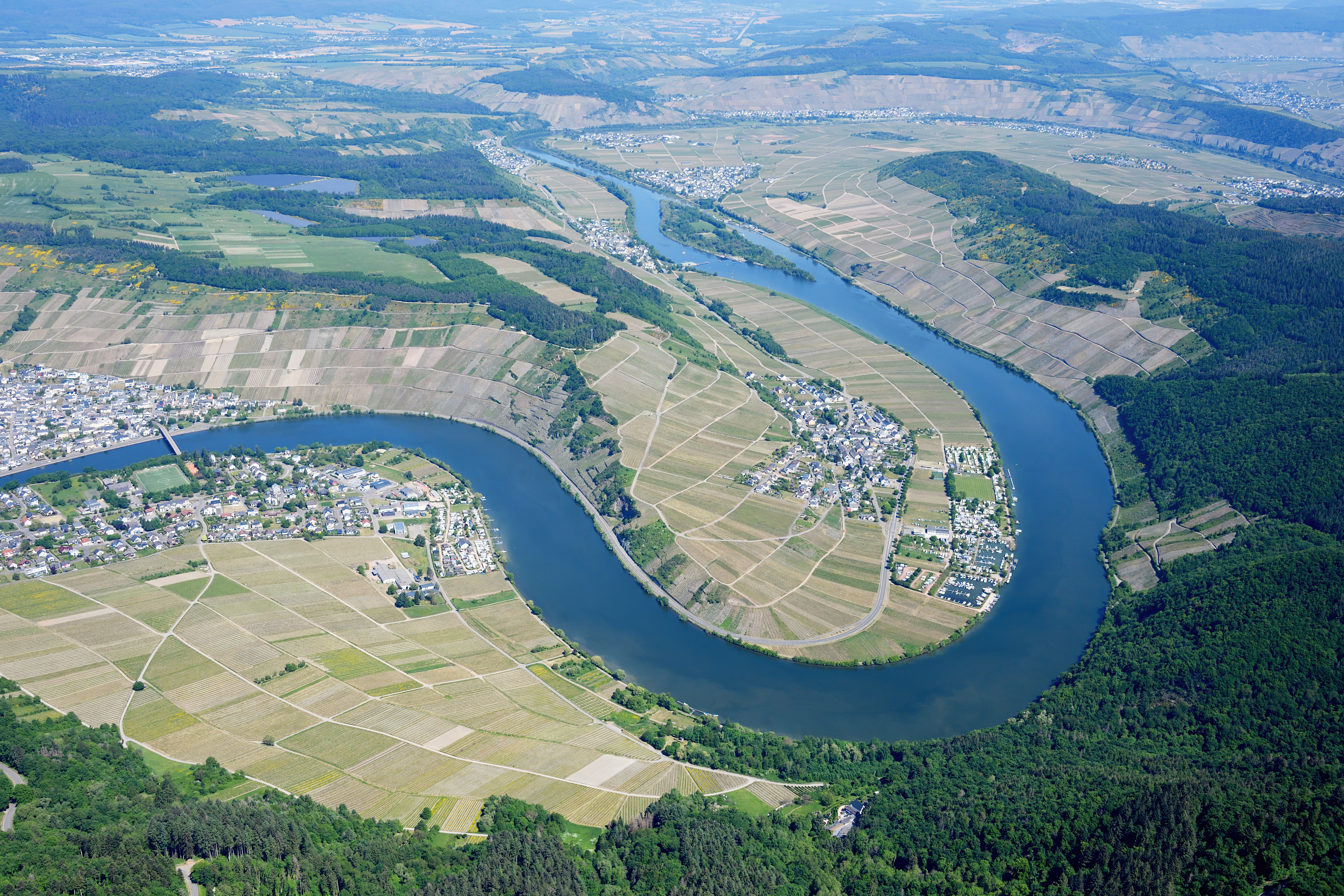

- Coat of arms

- Location of Pölich within Trier-Saarburg district
- Interactive map of Pölich
- Location within Germany Location within Rhineland-Palatinate
- Coordinates: 49°47′50″N 6°50′58″E
- Country: Germany
- State: Rhineland-Palatinate
- District: Trier-Saarburg
- Municipal assoc.: Schweich an der Römischen Weinstraße

Government
  - Mayor (2019–24): Frank Hömme

Area
  - Total: 3.20 km^{2} (1.24 sq mi)
- Elevation: 343 m (1,125 ft)

Population (2025-12-31)
  - Total: 438
  - Density: 137/km^{2} (355/sq mi)
- Time zone: UTC+01:00 (CET)
  - Summer (DST): UTC+02:00 (CEST)
- Postal codes: 54340
- Dialling codes: 06507
- Vehicle registration: TR
- Website: www.poelich.de

Pölich is a municipality in the Trier-Saarburg district, in Rhineland-Palatinate, Germany.
