= Mannebach, Vulkaneifel =

Mannebach
- Municipality
- Coat of arms

- Location of Mannebach within Vulkaneifel district
- Interactive map of Mannebach
- Location within Germany Location within Rhineland-Palatinate
- Coordinates: 50°16′57″N 6°59′11″E
- Country: Germany
- State: Rhineland-Palatinate
- District: Vulkaneifel
- Municipal assoc.: Kelberg

Government
  - Mayor (2019–24): Walter Eich

Area
  - Total: 7.34 km^{2} (2.83 sq mi)
- Elevation: 505 m (1,657 ft)

Population (2025-12-31)
  - Total: 236
  - Density: 32.2/km^{2} (83.3/sq mi)
- Time zone: UTC+01:00 (CET)
  - Summer (DST): UTC+02:00 (CEST)
- Postal codes: 56769
- Dialling codes: 02657
- Vehicle registration: DAU

Mannebach (German pronunciation: [ˈmanəbax]) is an Ortsgemeinde – a municipality belonging to a Verbandsgemeinde, a kind of collective municipality – in the Vulkaneifel district in Rhineland-Palatinate, Germany. It belongs to the Verbandsgemeinde of Kelberg, whose seat is in the like-named municipality.

== Geography ==
The municipality lies in the Vulkaneifel, a part of the Eifel known for its volcanic history, geographical and geological features, and even ongoing activity today, including gases that sometimes well up from the earth.

== History ==
The discovery of a graveyard in the woods known as “Scheid” shows that the area has been settled since prehistoric times. The graveyard dates from Hallstatt times up to the time of the Roman presence in the region (roughly 700 BC to AD 353).

Finds from Roman times have also been unearthed including ceramics and coins. Two Roman settlements are known to have existed in what is now Mannebach, one each in the rural cadastral areas of “Klöppesch” and “Lange Bahn”, which have yielded wall remnants, bricks and potsherds that have been dated to the 3rd and 4th centuries.

They are believed to have been destroyed in 353 in the Germanic invasions. Libanius reported something of the invaders’ behaviour at this time: “…The Germanic people dragged all objects of value, women and children along with them; the prisoners followed the procession, their packs on their backs. Whoever was unsuitable as a slave, whoever did not put up with seeing wife or daughter raped, was strangled in his misery. All our belongings they took with them, and while the victors reaped our harvest, they had the prisoners work the fields of their own land.”

There was no further settlement here until the Middle Ages, when it began again in the 10th and 11th centuries. Ceramic finds have been brought to light from this time, as well.

In 1336, Mannebach had its first documentary mention when the Count of Virneburg sold Archbishop Balduin of Trier his castle for 2,200 Gulden, only to have the Archbishop enfeoff him with the same, while exacting a yearly tribute of 220 Gulden from the Count, which the Count paid the Archbishop mostly in produce, which, of course, the Count in turn exacted from the peasants who worked his fief. Mannebach's contribution to this was 29 Malter – roughly 2 700 kg – of feed oats.

Mannebach was an important place in the County of Virneburg. It belonged to the so-called Upper County and was a mayoral seat. This “mayor”, however, bore the title Heimbürger, which was given a man who had actually been chosen by the community, not by the Count. This one led not only Mannebach, but also Bereborn and Kolverath. It can therefore be inferred that the 29 Malter of feed oats that Mannebach owed the Count of Virneburg each year was actually drawn from all three villages, although this is unconfirmed.

Mannebach's importance was matched by its great municipal area. Even today, it is still, at 734 ha, almost one and a half times as big as Bereborn (257 ha) and Kolverath (246 ha) put together. Its importance could also be seen in the important residents. Along with the Heimbürger, Mannebach was also home to a Vogt who served the Count as an official, and to various Schöffen (roughly “lay jurists”) for the parish of Retterath. The court Schöffe Stefan Schmitt from Mannebach (died 2 January 1770) was even chairman of the court at Retterath and Vogt at the same time. The stone cross beside the Heiligenhäuschen (a small, shrinelike structure consecrated to a saint or saints) on the way out of the village towards Retterath is believed to have been put up in 1724 as a memorial to one of his kin. Legend has it that the angel on the cross has a Virneburg countess's facial features. The Virneburg coat of arms with its seven-lozenge charge can also be made out in the angel's ruff.

The Thirty Years' War was a time of great hardship and wretchedness for the whole area. The County of Virneburg, which had embraced the Evangelical faith, had supplied the Swedes at Andernach and Sinzig with provisions. After the Spaniards drove them out, things went badly for the county. Spanish troops were billeted locally, and the peasants had to feed – and pay for – soldiers and horses. By 1640, there were only seven families still living in Mannebach, the others all having died. In August and September 1640, two companies of foreign mercenaries swept from village to village threshing all the grain in the fields. In the decades that followed came Louis XIV's wars of plunder, which drove a great many of the impoverished population to flight.

== Politics ==
=== Municipal council ===
The council is made up of 6 council members, who were elected by majority vote at the municipal election held on 7 June 2009, and the honorary mayor as chairman.

=== Mayor ===
Mannebach's mayor is Walter Eich, and his deputy is Reinhold Müller.

=== Coat of arms ===
The German blazon reads: In Gold ein nach oben und nach rechts versetztes rotes Kreuz, oben links sieben rote Rauten (4:3), unten links schwebend ein grüner Palmzweig gekreuzt von einem grünen Pfeil begleitet von einem schräglinken blauen Wellenbalken.

The municipality's arms might in English heraldic language be described thus: Or a cross enhanced and to dexter gules, in chief sinister seven lozenges, four and three, of the same, below and to sinister of the cross, a palm frond and an arrow per saltire vert, the latter surmounting the former, and the former pointing at the centre of the cross, and emerging from base point a bendlet sinister wavy azure.

The red cross refers to the village's former allegiance to the Bishopric of Trier. The seven lozenges, too, recall a former allegiance, this one to the County of Virneburg. This charge is drawn from the Counts’ old arms. The palm frond and the arrow are Saint Sebastian’s attributes, with the palm frond symbolizing Sebastian’s survival of an execution by bow and arrow as a sign of victory, for according to legend, Sebastian was nursed back to health after he was believed to be dead. The blue bendlet sinister stands for the brook that runs through the village, also called the Mannebach; it is the municipality’s namesake.

== Culture and sightseeing ==
In the Mannebach municipal forest, prehistoric barrows and Roman graves have been found, bearing witness to earlier settlement here. The chapel is consecrated to the Raising of the Cross and to Saint Sebastian. It was built in 1772. There are in the municipality several basalt crosses from the 18th century and a Bildstock from the 17th. Buildings of historical interest in the municipality are the following:

- Catholic Church of the Raising of the Cross (branch church, Filialkirche Zur Kreuzaufrichtung), Kirchstraße 2, biaxial aisleless church from 1772, basalt shaft cross from 1719.
- Hauptstraße 30 – timber-frame house from 1764, remodelled to the point of ruination.
- Hauptstraße/corner of Auf dem Heidchen – wayside cross, basalt shaft cross from 1724.
- Hauptstraße/corner of Dorfstraße – wayside cross, basalt shaft cross from 1697.
- Heiligenhäuschen (a small, shrinelike structure consecrated to a saint or saints), southeast of the village on the road to Retterath, plastered structure with niche relief.

== Awards ==
Mannebach took part in 2009 in the contest Unser Dorf hat Zukunft (“Our Village Has Future”) placing first at the district level and second in the regional placings.
