= Longen =

- Municipality
- Coat of arms

- Location of Longen within Trier-Saarburg district
- Interactive map of Longen
- Location within Germany Location within Rhineland-Palatinate
- Coordinates: 49°48′15″N 6°47′22″E
- Country: Germany
- State: Rhineland-Palatinate
- District: Trier-Saarburg
- Municipal assoc.: Schweich an der Römischen Weinstraße

Area
  - Total: 0.97 km^{2} (0.37 sq mi)
- Elevation: 129 m (423 ft)

Population (2025-12-31)
  - Total: 122
  - Density: 130/km^{2} (330/sq mi)
- Time zone: UTC+01:00 (CET)
  - Summer (DST): UTC+02:00 (CEST)
- Postal codes: 54338
- Dialling codes: 06502
- Vehicle registration: TR
- Website: Longen auf der Website der VG Schweich

Longen (German pronunciation: [ˈlɔŋən]) is a municipality in the Trier-Saarburg district, in Rhineland-Palatinate, Germany.
