= Longuich =

- Municipality
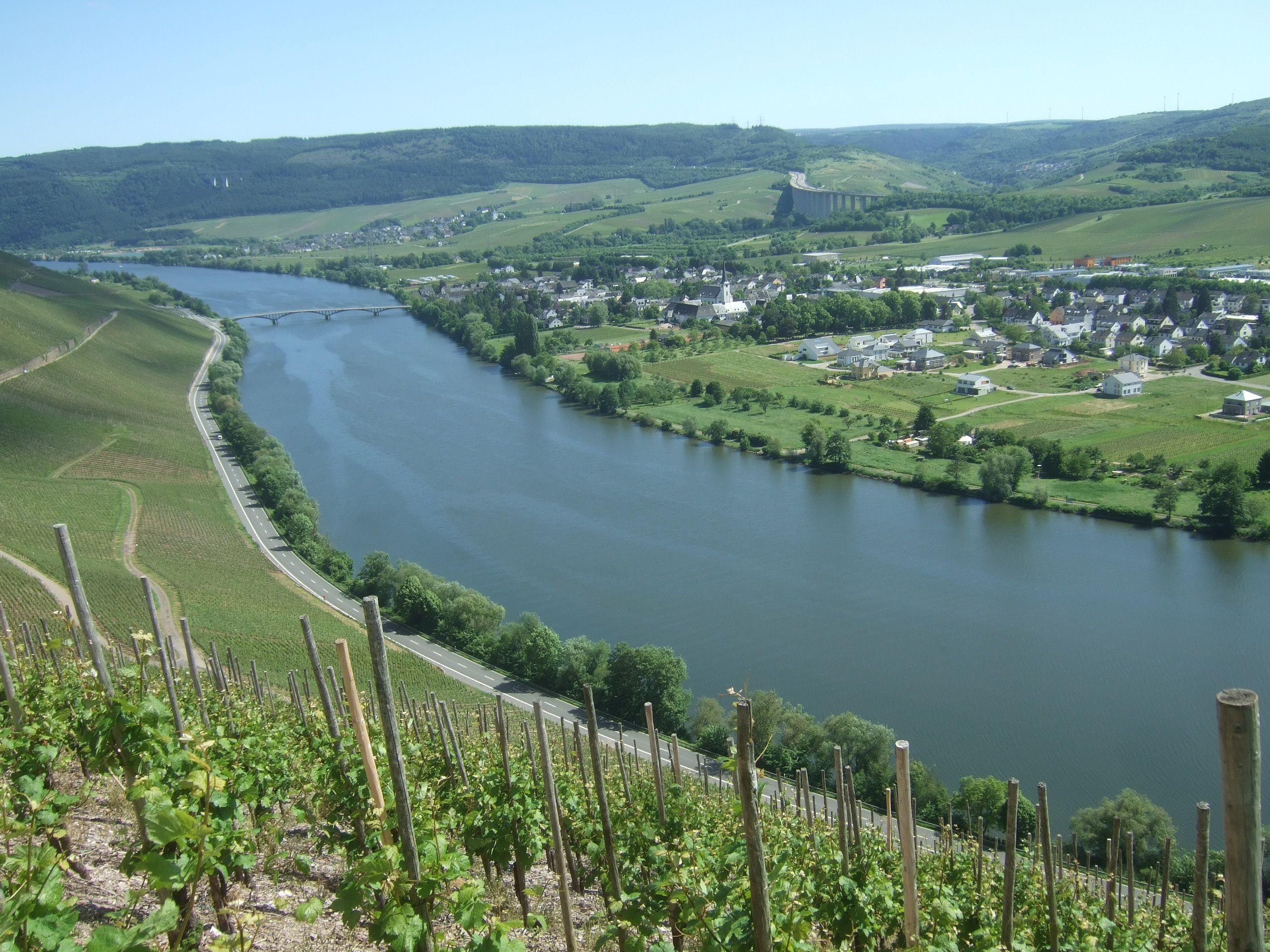

- Coat of arms

- Location of Longuich within Trier-Saarburg district
- Interactive map of Longuich
- Location within Germany Location within Rhineland-Palatinate
- Coordinates: 49°48′29″N 6°46′12″E
- Country: Germany
- State: Rhineland-Palatinate
- District: Trier-Saarburg
- Municipal assoc.: Schweich an der Römischen Weinstraße

Government
  - Mayor (2019–24): Manfred Wagner (CDU)

Area
  - Total: 8.82 km^{2} (3.41 sq mi)
- Elevation: 250 m (820 ft)

Population (2025-12-31)
  - Total: 1,283
  - Density: 145/km^{2} (377/sq mi)
- Time zone: UTC+01:00 (CET)
  - Summer (DST): UTC+02:00 (CEST)
- Postal codes: 54340
- Dialling codes: 06502
- Vehicle registration: TR
- Website: longuich.de

Longuich (German pronunciation: [ˈlɔŋɡɪç]) is a municipality in the Trier-Saarburg district, in Rhineland-Palatinate, Germany. It lies on the river Moselle. A part of Longuich is Kirsch.

It was the birthplace of Theodore Nesser, father of the Nesser Brothers of the National Football League, who played for the now defunct Columbus Panhandles in the 1920s.
