= Schweich =

- Town
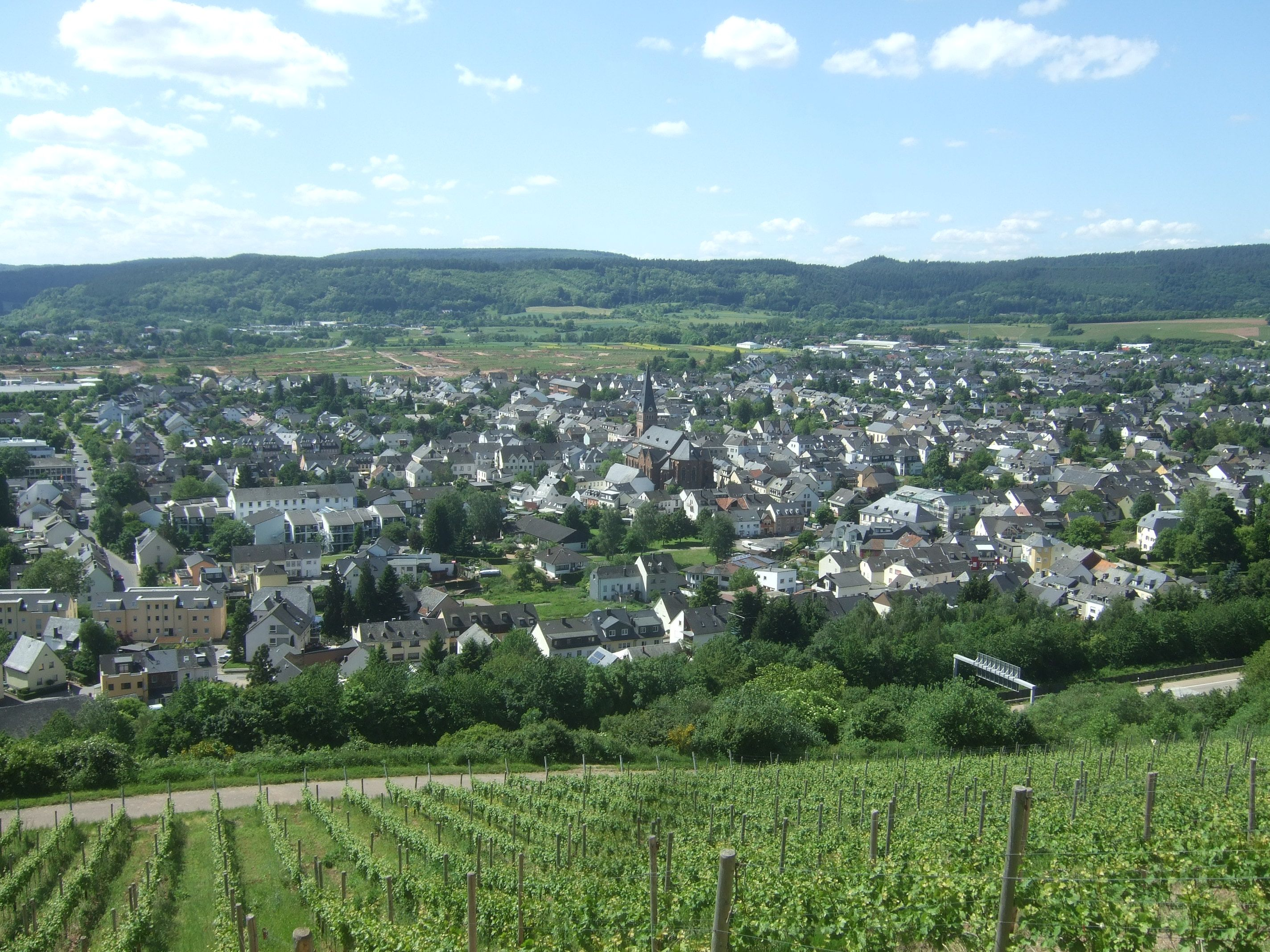

- Coat of arms

- Location of Schweich within Trier-Saarburg district
- Interactive map of Schweich
- Location within Germany Location within Rhineland-Palatinate
- Coordinates: 49°49′12″N 6°45′8″E
- Country: Germany
- State: Rhineland-Palatinate
- District: Trier-Saarburg
- Municipal assoc.: Schweich an der Römischen Weinstraße

Government
  - Mayor (2019–24): Lars Rieger (CDU)

Area
  - Total: 31.08 km^{2} (12.00 sq mi)
- Elevation: 133 m (436 ft)

Population (2025-12-31)
  - Total: 7,663
  - Density: 246.6/km^{2} (638.6/sq mi)
- Time zone: UTC+01:00 (CET)
  - Summer (DST): UTC+02:00 (CEST)
- Postal codes: 54338
- Dialling codes: 06502
- Vehicle registration: TR, SAB
- Website: www.stadt-schweich.de

Schweich (German pronunciation: [ʃvaɪç]) is a town in the Trier-Saarburg district, in Rhineland-Palatinate, Germany. It is situated on the river Moselle, approx. 10 km (6.2 mi) northeast of Trier.

Schweich is the seat of the Verbandsgemeinde ("collective municipality") Schweich an der Römischen Weinstraße.

== Twin towns — sister cities ==
Schweich is twinned with:

- Marsannay-la-Côte, France
- Portishead, Somerset, United Kingdom
- Krokowa, Poland
- Renesse, Netherlands
- Murialdo, Italy

== Personalities ==
- Stefan Andres (1906–1970), writer, see also Stefan Andres Society, Stefan Andres Prize
- Gabriele Pauli (born 1957), former politician
- Katarina Barley (born 1968), politician (SPD)
