= Leiwen =

- Municipality
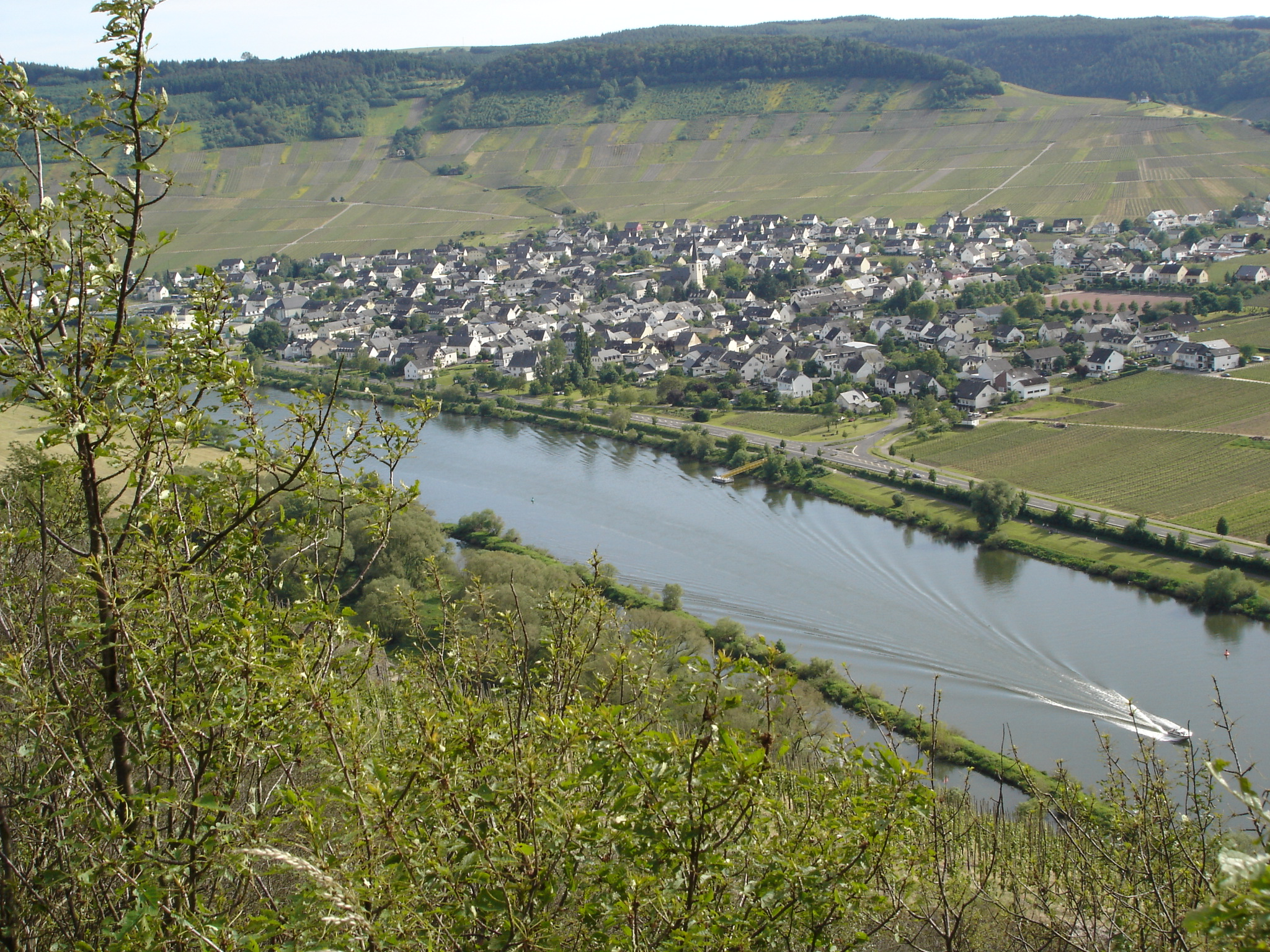

- Coat of arms

- Location of Leiwen within Trier-Saarburg district
- Interactive map of Leiwen
- Location within Germany Location within Rhineland-Palatinate
- Coordinates: 49°49′16″N 6°52′53″E
- Country: Germany
- State: Rhineland-Palatinate
- District: Trier-Saarburg
- Municipal assoc.: Schweich an der Römischen Weinstraße

Government
  - Mayor (2019–24): Sascha Hermes (CDU)

Area
  - Total: 12.71 km^{2} (4.91 sq mi)
- Elevation: 129 m (423 ft)

Population (2025-12-31)
  - Total: 1,623
  - Density: 127.7/km^{2} (330.7/sq mi)
- Time zone: UTC+01:00 (CET)
  - Summer (DST): UTC+02:00 (CEST)
- Postal codes: 54340
- Dialling codes: 06507
- Vehicle registration: TR
- Website: www.leiwen.de

Leiwen (German pronunciation: [ˈlaɪvn̩]) is a municipality in the Trier-Saarburg district, in Rhineland-Palatinate, Germany. It is within a ten-mile radius of the city of Trier. Leiwen is one of the most significant wine growing municipalities on the Moselle river. The village is located on the banks of the river Moselle.

== History ==
The village of Leiwen is said to have got its name from Livia, the wife of emperor Augustus, who had a summer residence in the village, and she gave her name to the village. There have been several excavations in the village, unearthing buildings and artefacts dating back to Roman times.

== Wine ==
The village is situated in the middle of vast grapevines, and is in one of the main wine growing areas of Germany. The village produces wine made from the Riesling grape variety. The village holds a wine festival every year, which is a big draw for tourists.
