= Riol =

- Municipality
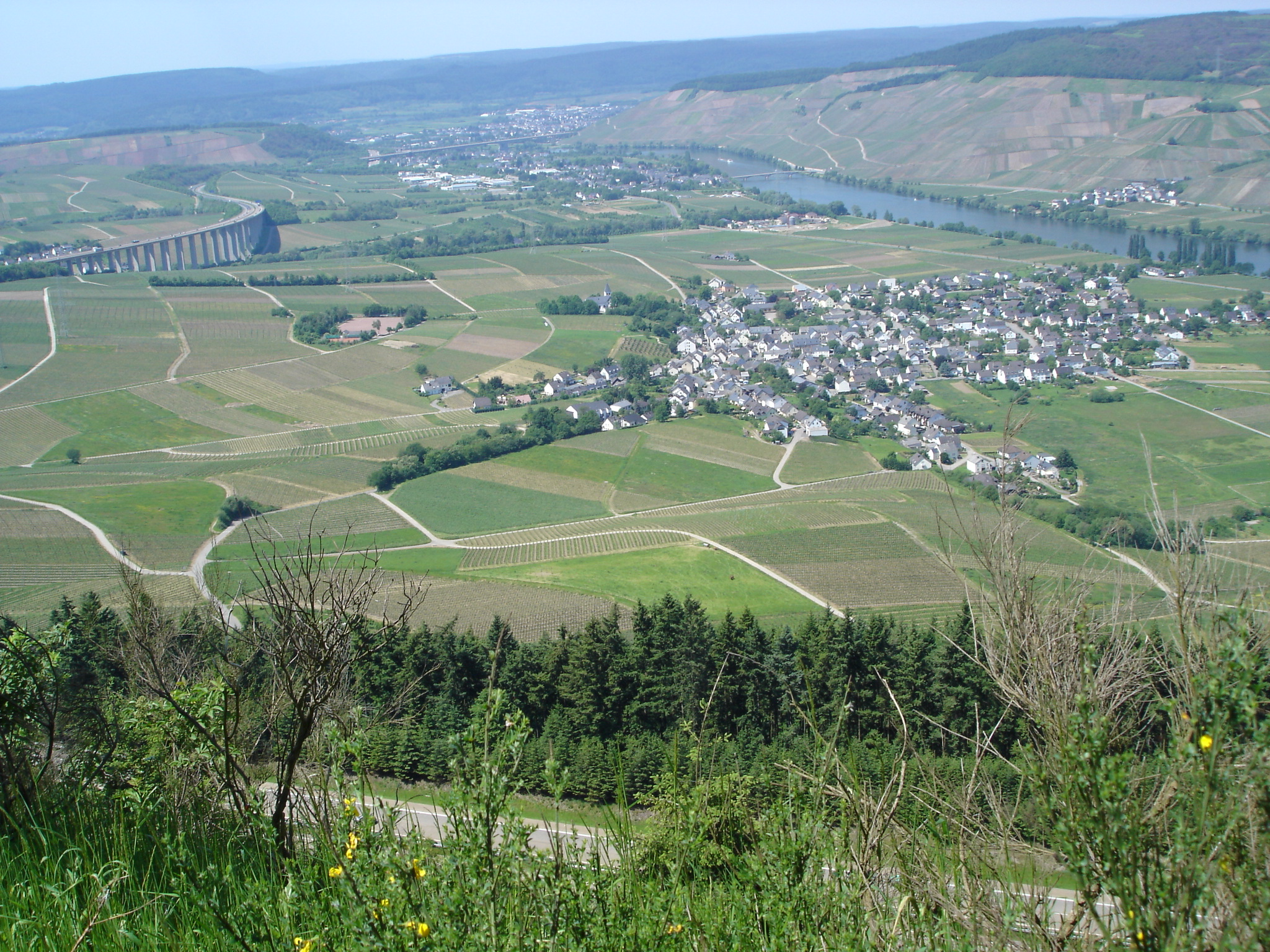

- Coat of arms

- Location of Riol within Trier-Saarburg district
- Interactive map of Riol
- Location within Germany Location within Rhineland-Palatinate
- Coordinates: 49°47′36″N 6°47′29″E
- Country: Germany
- State: Rhineland-Palatinate
- District: Trier-Saarburg
- Municipal assoc.: Schweich an der Römischen Weinstraße

Government
  - Mayor (2019–24): Christel Egner-Duppich

Area
  - Total: 6.3 km^{2} (2.4 sq mi)
- Elevation: 123 m (404 ft)

Population (2025-12-31)
  - Total: 1,332
  - Density: 210/km^{2} (550/sq mi)
- Time zone: UTC+01:00 (CET)
  - Summer (DST): UTC+02:00 (CEST)
- Postal codes: 54340
- Dialling codes: 06502
- Vehicle registration: TR

Riol is a municipality in the Trier-Saarburg district, in Rhineland-Palatinate, Germany, near Trier.
