= Saarburg (Verbandsgemeinde) =

Coordinates: 49°36′33″N 6°33′01″E

Saarburg is a former Verbandsgemeinde ("collective municipality") in the district Trier-Saarburg, in Rhineland-Palatinate, Germany. The seat of the Verbandsgemeinde was in the town Saarburg. In January 2019 it was merged into the new Verbandsgemeinde Saarburg-Kell.

The Verbandsgemeinde Saarburg consisted of the following Ortsgemeinden ("local municipalities"):

1. Ayl
2. Fisch
3. Freudenburg
4. Irsch
5. Kastel-Staadt
6. Kirf
7. Mannebach
8. Merzkirchen
9. Ockfen
10. Palzem
11. Saarburg
12. Schoden
13. Serrig
14. Taben-Rodt
15. Trassem
16. Wincheringen
