= Kell am See (Verbandsgemeinde) =

Former municipality in Rhineland-Palatinate

Coordinates: 49.633°N 6.822°E

Kell am See is a former Verbandsgemeinde ("collective municipality") in the district Trier-Saarburg, in Rhineland-Palatinate, Germany. The seat of the Verbandsgemeinde was in Kell am See. In January 2019 it was merged into the new Verbandsgemeinde Saarburg-Kell.

The Verbandsgemeinde Kell am See consisted of the following Ortsgemeinden ("local municipalities"):

1. Baldringen
2. Greimerath
3. Heddert
4. Hentern
5. Kell am See
6. Lampaden
7. Mandern
8. Paschel
9. Schillingen
10. Schömerich
11. Vierherrenborn
12. Waldweiler
13. Zerf
