= Kell =

Kell may refer to:

== People ==
- Kell (given name), including a list of people and fictional characters with the name
- Kell (surname), including a list of people and fictional characters with the name
- Kell (footballer) (José Clebson Augustinho, born 1980), a Brazilian footballer

== Places ==
- Kell (volcano), Kamchatka Peninsula, Russia
- Kell, Illinois, U.S.
- Kell am See, Trier-Saarburg district, Rhineland-Palatinate, Germany

== Other uses ==
- Kell antigen system, a group of antigens on the human red blood cell surface
- Kell dragon, a fictional creature in the Star Wars universe
- Kell factor, a parameter used to limit the bandwidth of a sampled image signal
- Book of Kells, an 8th-century compilation of the 4 gospels of the bible
- An oast house kiln
- Tribal leaders of the Fallen in the video game Destiny

== See also ==
- Kel (disambiguation)
- Kells (disambiguation)
- Kelly (disambiguation)
- Kehl, a town in Germany
- Kehl (surname)
