= Kells =

Kells may refer to:

== Places ==
=== Republic of Ireland ===
- Kells, County Clare (Irish: Na Cealla), a townland; see List of townlands of County Clare
- Kells, County Kerry (Irish: Na Cealla), a townland; see List of townlands of County Kerry
- Kells, County Kilkenny (Irish: Ceanannas), a village
  - Kells Priory, a large, ruined Augustinian priory, established 1193
- Kells, County Limerick (Irish: Na Cealla), a townland; see List of townlands of County Limerick
- Kells, County Meath (Irish: Ceanannas), a town
  - Abbey of Kells, maybe founded by St. Columba in 554
  - Kells (Parliament of Ireland constituency) until 1800

=== United Kingdom ===
- Kells, County Antrim, Northern Ireland (Irish: Ceanannas)
- Kells, Whitehaven, Cumbria, England
- Kells, Dumfries and Galloway, Scotland

== Other uses ==
- Kells (band), a French band
- Kells (name), including a list of people with the name
- Kells Academy, a private English institution in Montreal, Canada
- Kells A.R.L.F.C., an English rugby league club
- Tribal leaders of alien clans in the video game Destiny
- Kells, a nickname for American musician R. Kelly

== See also ==
- Kell (disambiguation)
- The Book of Kells (disambiguation)
  - Book of Kells, an illuminated manuscript Gospel book in Latin, c. 800 AD
- Kells railway station (disambiguation)
- Port Kells, British Columbia, Canada
