= Kells railway station =

Kells railway station may refer to:

- Kells railway station (Northern Ireland), on the Ballymena and Larne Railway, in County Antrim, Northern Ireland
- Kells railway station (County Kerry), on the Great Southern and Western Railway, in County Kerry, Ireland
- Kells railway station (County Meath), on the Dublin–Navan railway line, in County Meath, Ireland
