= Saarburg-Kell =

- Verbandsgemeinde
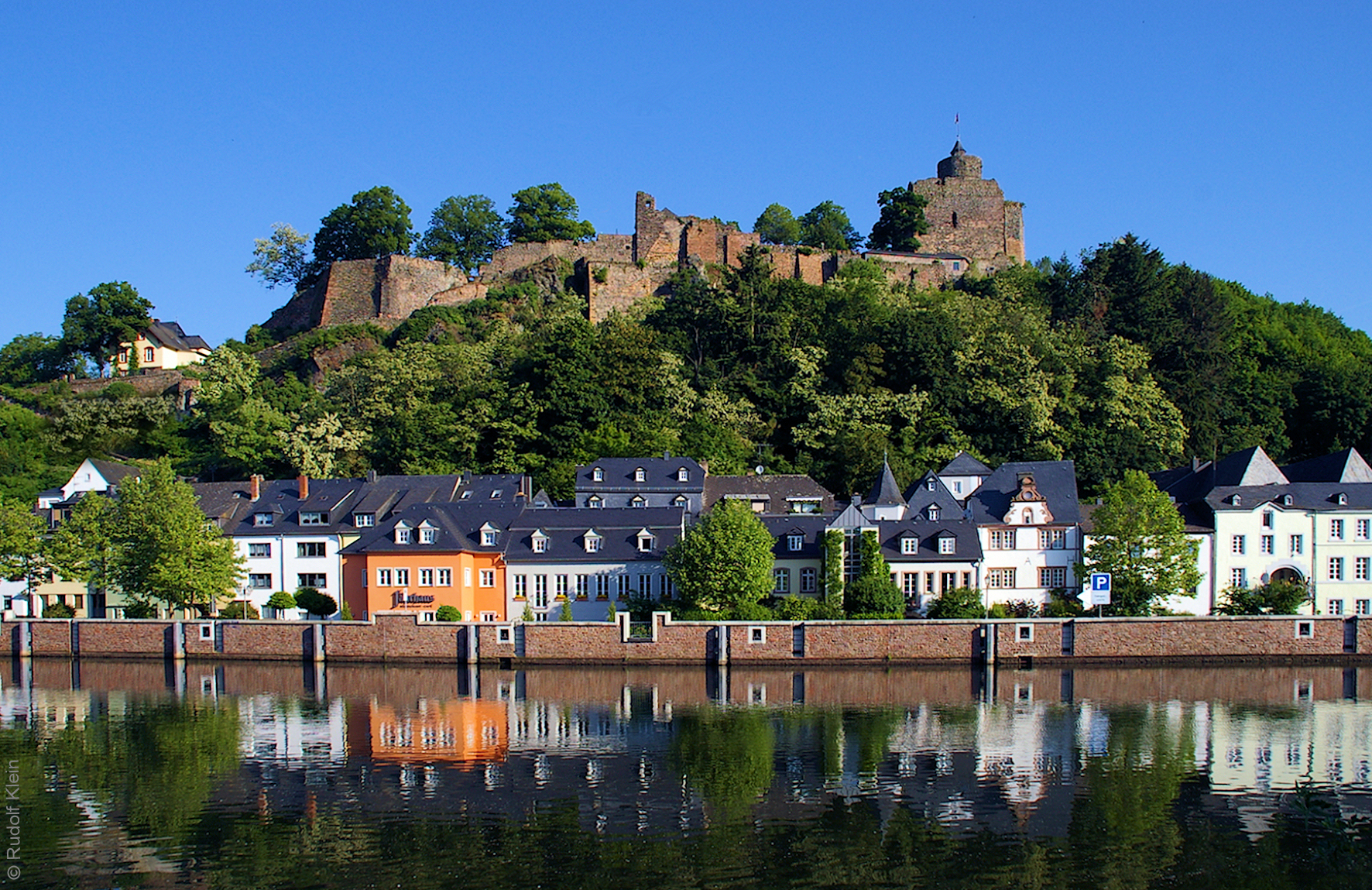
- Castle panorama, Saarburg's old city

- Location of Saarburg-Kell within Trier-Saarburg district
- Interactive map of Saarburg-Kell
- Location within Germany Location within Rhineland-Palatinate
- Coordinates: 49°37′N 6°33′E
- Country: Germany
- State: Rhineland-Palatinate
- District: Trier-Saarburg
- Seat: Saarburg
- Subdivisions: 29 municipalities

Area
  - Total: 359.85 km^{2} (138.94 sq mi)

Population (2025-12-31)
  - Total: 33,540
  - Density: 93.21/km^{2} (241.4/sq mi)
- Time zone: UTC+01:00 (CET)
  - Summer (DST): UTC+02:00 (CEST)
- Website: www.saarburg-kell.de

Saarburg-Kell (German pronunciation: [ˌzaːɐ̯bʊʁkˈkɛl]) is a Verbandsgemeinde ("collective municipality") in the district Trier-Saarburg, in Rhineland-Palatinate, Germany. The seat of the Verbandsgemeinde is in Saarburg. It was formed on 1 January 2019 by the merger of the former Verbandsgemeinden Saarburg and Kell am See.

The Verbandsgemeinde Saarburg-Kell consists of the following Ortsgemeinden ("local municipalities"):

1. Ayl
2. Baldringen
3. Fisch
4. Freudenburg
5. Greimerath
6. Heddert
7. Hentern
8. Irsch
9. Kastel-Staadt
10. Kell am See
11. Kirf
12. Lampaden
13. Mandern
14. Mannebach
15. Merzkirchen
16. Ockfen
17. Palzem
18. Paschel
19. Saarburg
20. Schillingen
21. Schoden
22. Schömerich
23. Serrig
24. Taben-Rodt
25. Trassem
26. Vierherrenborn
27. Waldweiler
28. Wincheringen
29. Zerf
