= Eria Tutara-Kauika Raukura =

Eria Tutara-Kauika Raukura (1834–1938) was a New Zealand tribal tohunga. Of Māori descent, he identified with the Ngai Tahupo, Ngati Kahungunu and Tuhoe iwi. He was born in Te Papuni, Hawke's Bay, New Zealand in about 1834.
