= The Book of Kells (disambiguation) =

The Book of Kells is an illuminated manuscript Gospel book, created by Celtic monks c. 800 AD.

The Book of Kells may also refer to:

- The Book of Kells (album), by Iona, 1992
- The Book of Kells (audio drama), a 2010 Doctor Who audio drama
- The Book of Kells, a 1985 fantasy novel by R. A. MacAvoy

== See also ==
- The Secret of Kells, a 2009 animated movie about the Book of Kells
- Kells (disambiguation)
