= Kell (surname) =

Kell is a surname. Notable people with the surname include:

- Allan Kell (1949–2024), English football player
- Ayla Kell (born 1990), American actress
- Cassandra Kell (born 1980), Australian football player
- Charles Kell (1905–1964), Australian rugby player
- Chip Kell (born 1949), Canadian football player
- Douglas Kell (born 1953), British biochemist
- Edward Kell (c. 1831 – 1908), British trade unionist and politician
- Ernie Kell (1928–2017), American politician
- Elizabeth Kell (born 1983), Australian rower
- Georg Kell, German business ethicist and UN official
- George Kell (footballer) (1896–1985), English football player
- George Kell (1922–2009), American baseball player
- James Kell (born 1997), British racing driver
- John McIntosh Kell (1823–1900), American Confederate naval officer
- Joseph Kell, pseudonym of British novelist Anthony Burgess
- Paul Kell (1915–1977), American football player
- Raymond D. Kell (1904–1986), American television researcher
- Reginald Kell (1906–1981), British clarinetist
- Richard Kell (footballer) (born 1979), English football player
- Richard Kell (poet) (1927–2023), Irish poet
- Rob Kell (1902–1983), English civil engineer
- Skeeter Kell (1929–2015), American baseball player
- Trey Kell (born 1996), American basketball player
- Troy Kell (born 1968), American murderer
- Vernon Kell (1873–1942), British intelligence director

== Fictional characters ==
- Jarmen Kell, a mercenary for the Global Liberation Army in the video game Command and Conquer: Generals and Command and Conquer: Generals Zero Hour
- Morgan and Patrick Kell, founders of the mercenary unit Kell Hounds in the BattleTech universe
- Phelan Kell, son of Morgan Kell and Salome Ward, junior Khan of Clan Wolf, and later senior Khan of Clan Wolf in Exile in the BattleTech universe
