= Kel =

Kel or KEL may refer to:

- Raquel Calderón (born 1991), Chilean singer and actress
- Kei Lun stop, Hong Kong, MTR station code KEL
- Kel, Azad Kashmir, village in Neelam Valley, Azad Kashmir, Pakistan
- Kel Calderón (born 1991), Chilean actress, singer and lawyer
- Kel Mitchell (born 1978), American actor and comedian
- KEL, the IATA airport code for Kiel Airport in Germany
- KEL Company Kerala Electrical and Allied Engineering Company
- Κel, elimination rate constant in pharmacological clearance
- KEL, a gene in the Kell antigen system
- KEL, a character in the 2020 role-playing video game Omori

== See also ==
- Kell (disambiguation)
