= Kells (name) =

Kells is a surname, also used as a nickname and given name.

Notable people with the name include:

== Surname ==
- Bill Kells, New Zealand rugby league player
- Greg Kells, Canadian businessman and politician
- Harriet B. Kells, American educator, activist, suffragist, feminist, editor
- Iris Kells (1923–2016), English operatic soprano
- Isabella Foster Rogers Kells, New Zealand community leader
- Morley Kells, Canadian politician
- Robert Kells (1832–1905), British soldier, recipient of the Victoria Cross
- Susannah Kells, pseudonym for Bernard and Judy Cornwell, English authors

== Nickname ==
- Machine Gun Kelly (rapper) ("Kells" for short), Cleveland Rapper/poet
- R. Kelly, an American R&B musician, sometimes referred to as "Kells"
- Kellin Quinn, American singer, sometimes referred to as "Kells"

== Given name ==
- Michael "Mick" John Kells Fleetwood, British musician, best known as part of Fleetwood Mac
- Ronald Allison Kells Mason, New Zealand poet
