= Taben-Rodt =

- Municipality
- Coat of arms

- Location of Taben-Rodt within Trier-Saarburg district
- Interactive map of Taben-Rodt
- Location within Germany Location within Rhineland-Palatinate
- Coordinates: 49°32′54″N 6°35′27″E
- Country: Germany
- State: Rhineland-Palatinate
- District: Trier-Saarburg
- Municipal assoc.: Saarburg-Kell

Government
  - Mayor (2019–24): Hans-Joachim Wallrich

Area
  - Total: 16.16 km^{2} (6.24 sq mi)
- Elevation: 250 m (820 ft)

Population (2025-12-31)
  - Total: 779
  - Density: 48.2/km^{2} (125/sq mi)
- Time zone: UTC+01:00 (CET)
  - Summer (DST): UTC+02:00 (CEST)
- Postal codes: 54441
- Dialling codes: 06582
- Vehicle registration: TR
- Website: www.taben.de

Taben-Rodt is a municipality in the Trier-Saarburg district, in Rhineland-Palatinate, Germany.

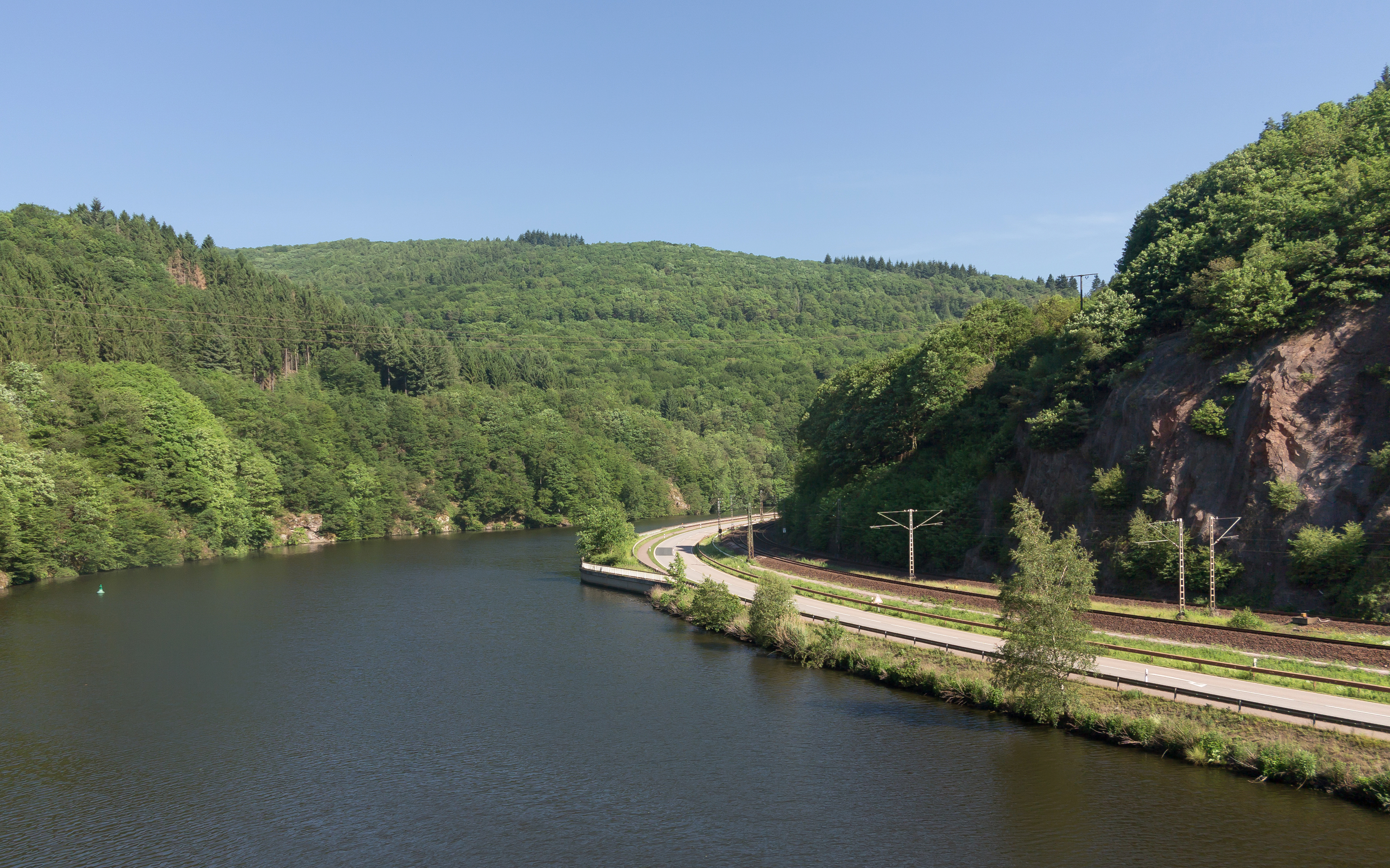
River the Saar between Taben-Rodt and Saarhölzbach

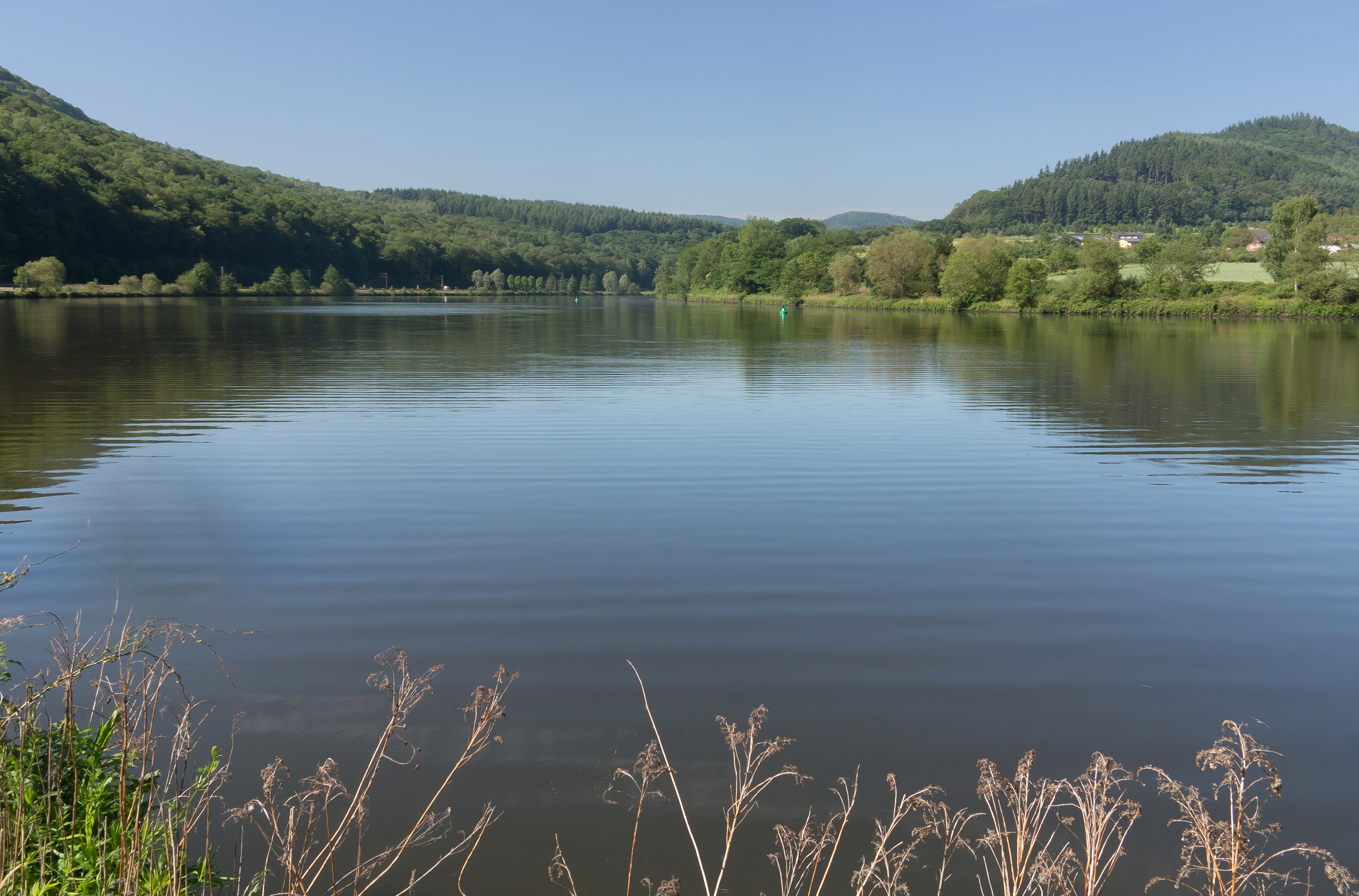
River the Saar between Taben Rodt and Serrig

== History ==
From 18 July 1946 to 6 June 1947 Taben-Rodt, in its then municipal boundary, formed part of the Saar Protectorate.
