= Saarburg =

- Town
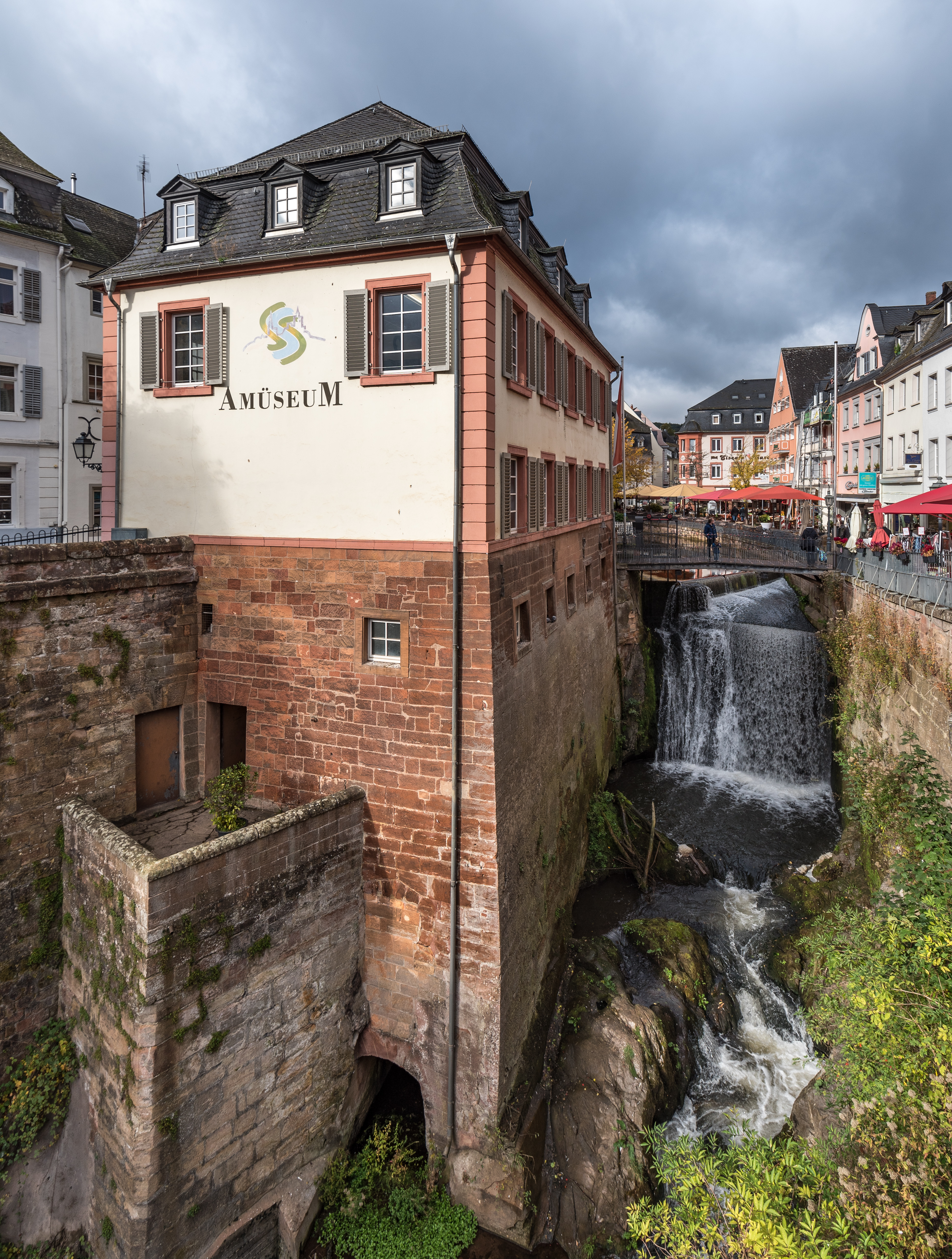

- Coat of arms

- Location of Saarburg within Trier-Saarburg district
- Interactive map of Saarburg
- Location within Germany Location within Rhineland-Palatinate
- Coordinates: 49°37′N 6°33′E
- Country: Germany
- State: Rhineland-Palatinate
- District: Trier-Saarburg
- Municipal assoc.: Saarburg-Kell
- Subdivisions: 4

Government
  - Mayor: Andreas Reymann

Area
  - Total: 20.63 km^{2} (7.97 sq mi)
- Elevation: 159 m (522 ft)

Population (2025-12-31)
  - Total: 7,533
  - Density: 365.1/km^{2} (945.7/sq mi)
- Time zone: UTC+01:00 (CET)
  - Summer (DST): UTC+02:00 (CEST)
- Postal codes: 54439
- Dialling codes: 06581
- Vehicle registration: TR, SAB
- Website: saarburg.de

Saarburg (German pronunciation: [ˈzaːɐ̯bʊʁk], [ˈzaːɐ̯bʊʁç]) is a town of the Trier-Saarburg district, in the state of Rhineland-Palatinate, Germany, on the banks of the river Saar in the hilly country a few kilometres upstream from the Saar's junction with the Moselle. Now known as a tourist attraction, the river Leuk flows into the town centre and makes a spectacular drop of 18 metres before joining the larger Saar that bisects the town. The waterfall is the result of a 13th-century project to redirect the Leuk through the city centre.

Saarburg is the seat of the Verbandsgemeinde ("collective municipality") Saarburg-Kell. The area around Saarburg is noted for the cultivation of Riesling grapes.

== History ==
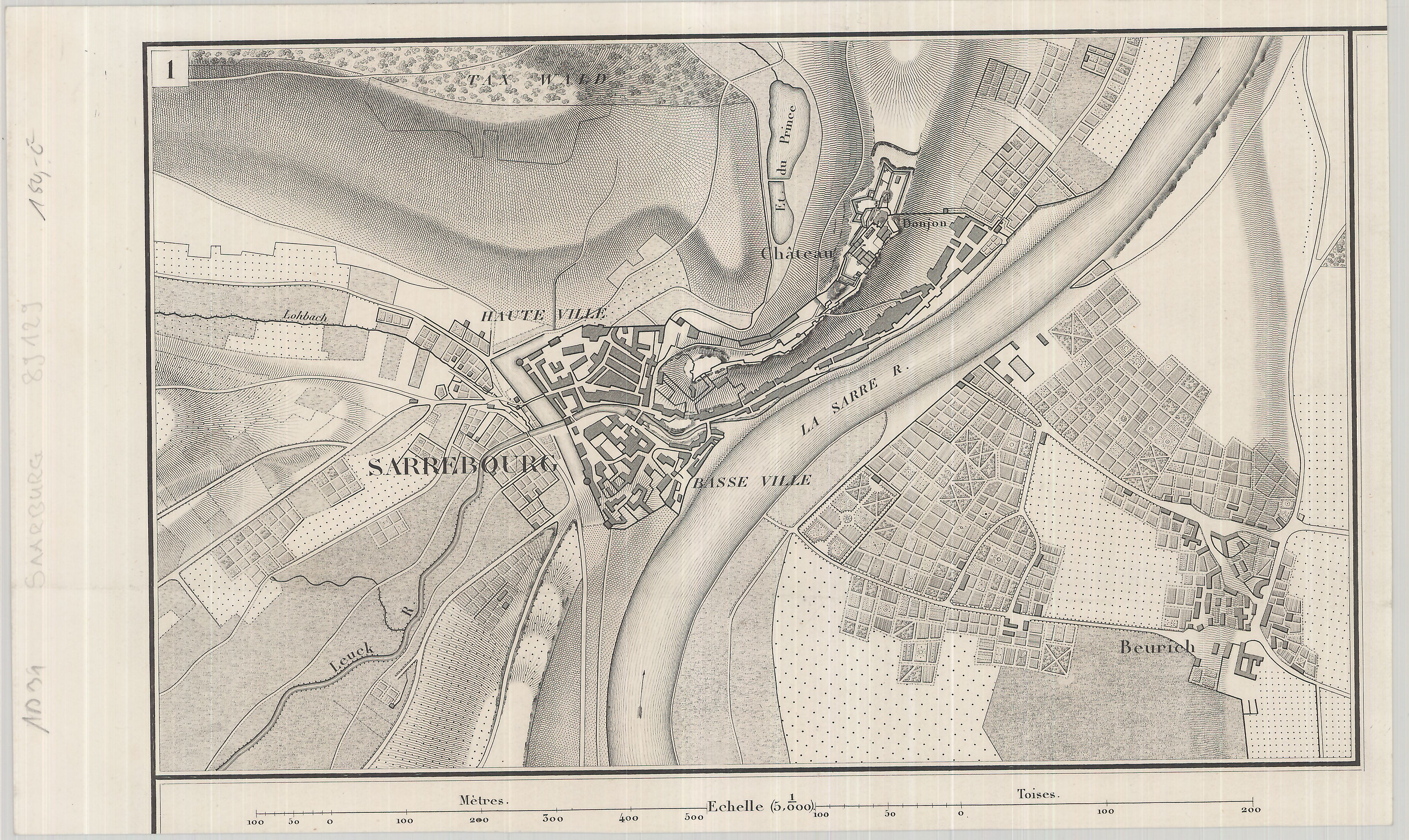
City and castle of Saarburg 1830

The history of the city begins with the construction of the now-ruined castle by Graf Siegfried of Luxembourg in 964. It received its town charter in 1291. The city has a bell foundry, the Glockengießerei Mabilion, which has been in operation since the 1770s, and as of 2003 the only one in Germany that produces bronze bells.

From 1945 to 1948 Saarburg was occupied by troops from Luxembourg. From 18 July 1946 to 6 June 1947 Onsdorf, in its then municipal boundary, formed part of the Saar Protectorate. French troops complemented the occupation until 1955.

Saarburg has a good history with bells.They are the producers of bells for many German cathedrals.

== Gallery ==
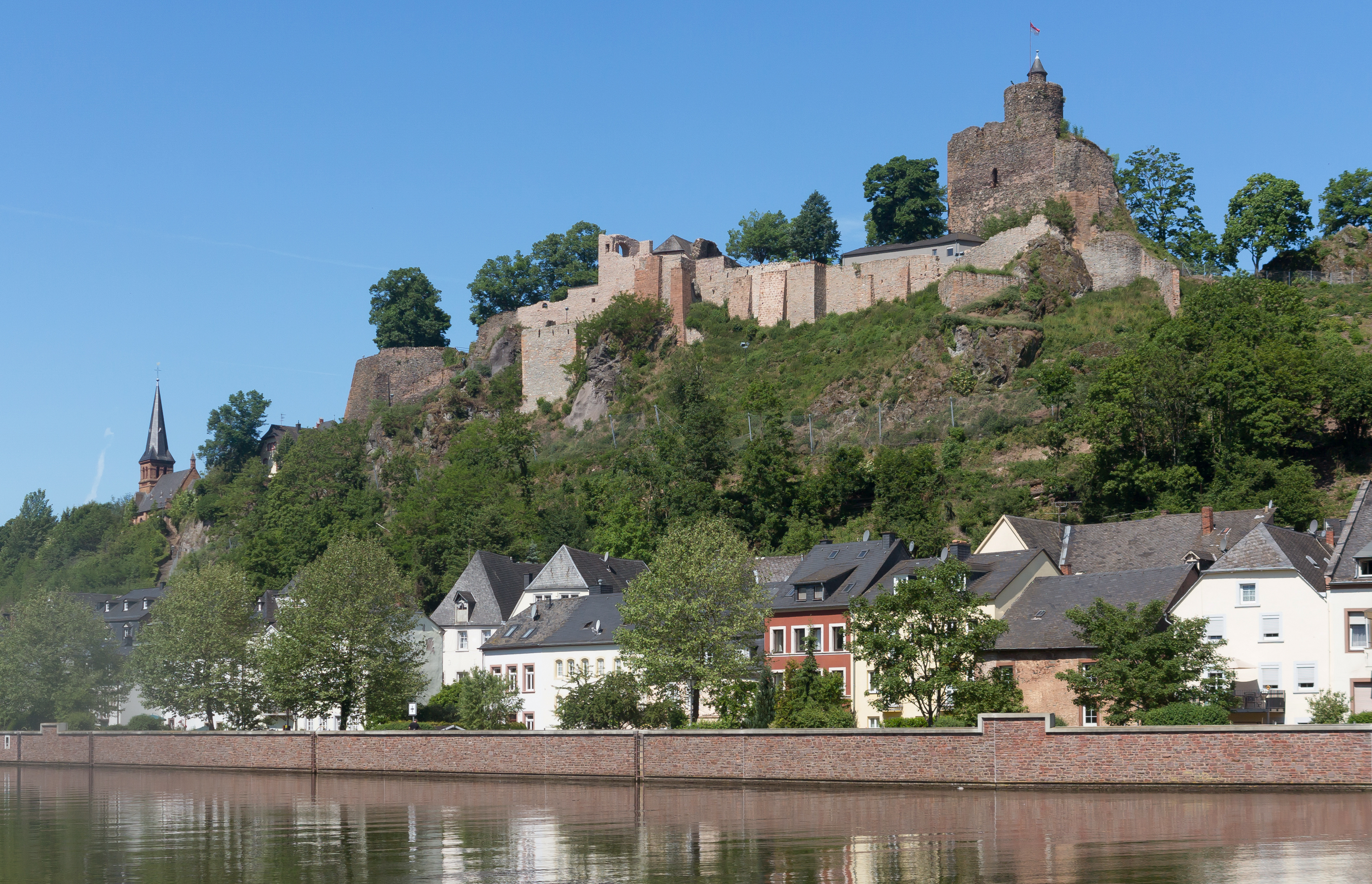
Saarburg, castle, Ober- und Unterstadt

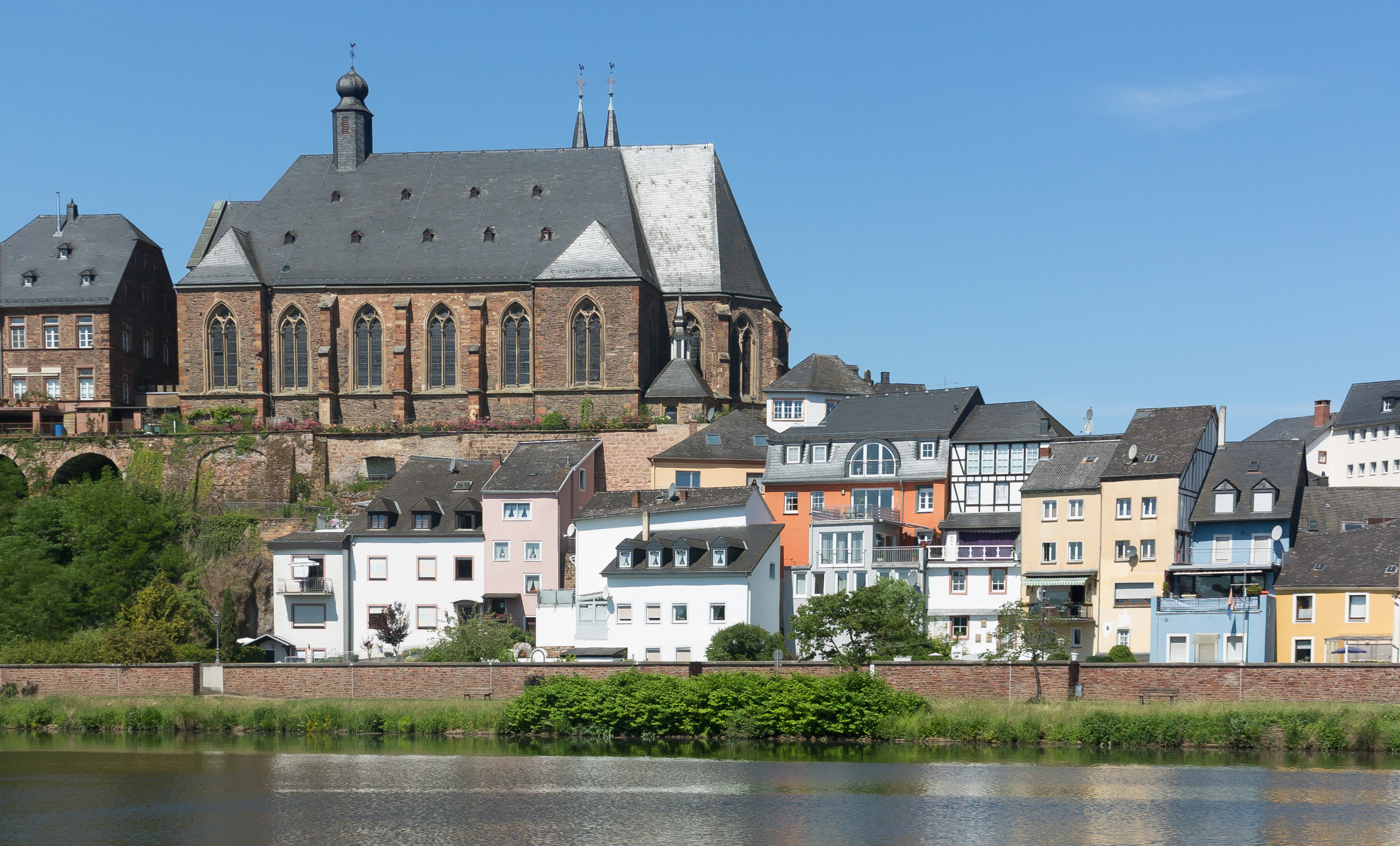
Catholic church (Pfarrkirche Sankt Laurentius)

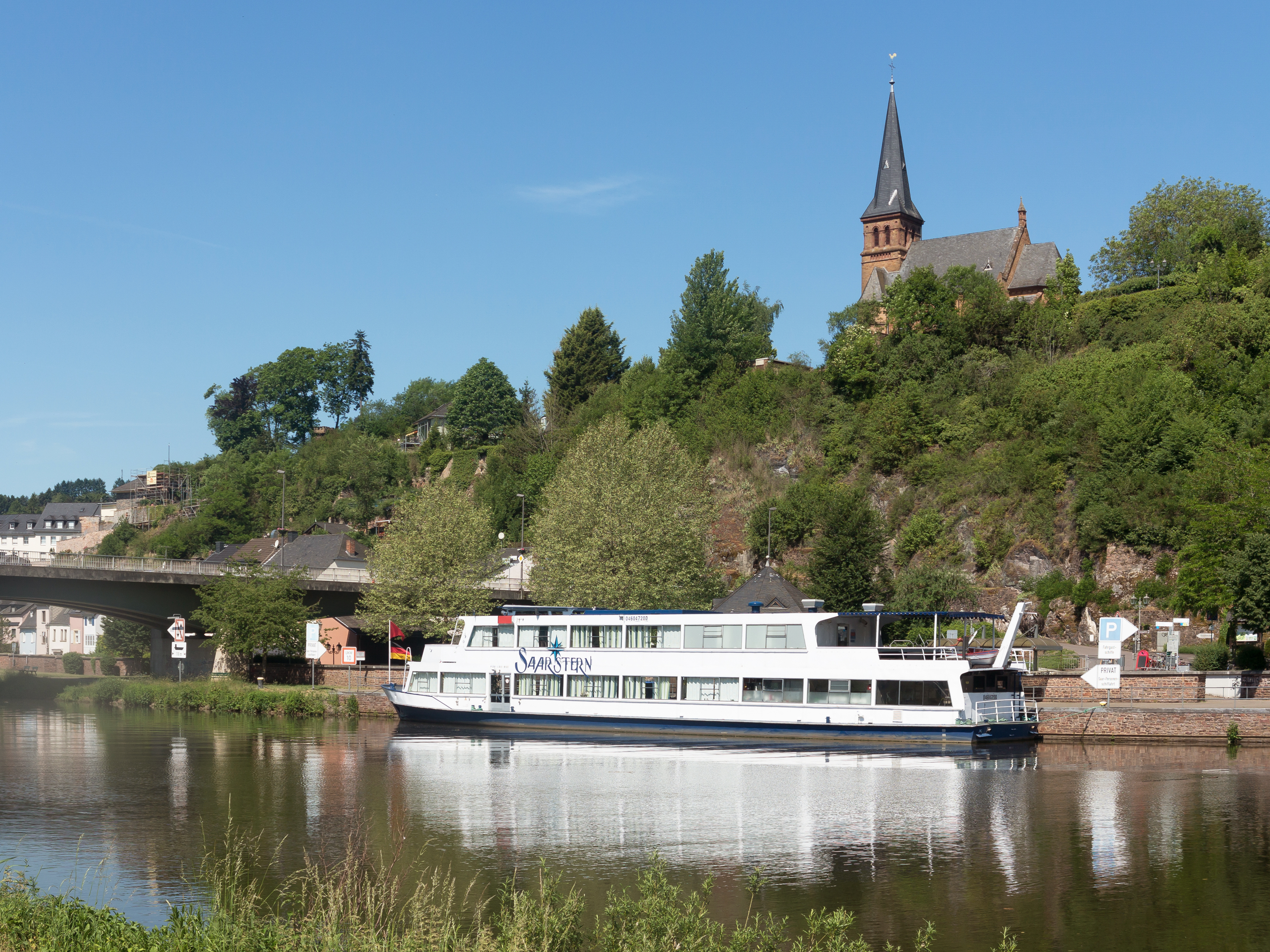
Reformed church and the river Saar

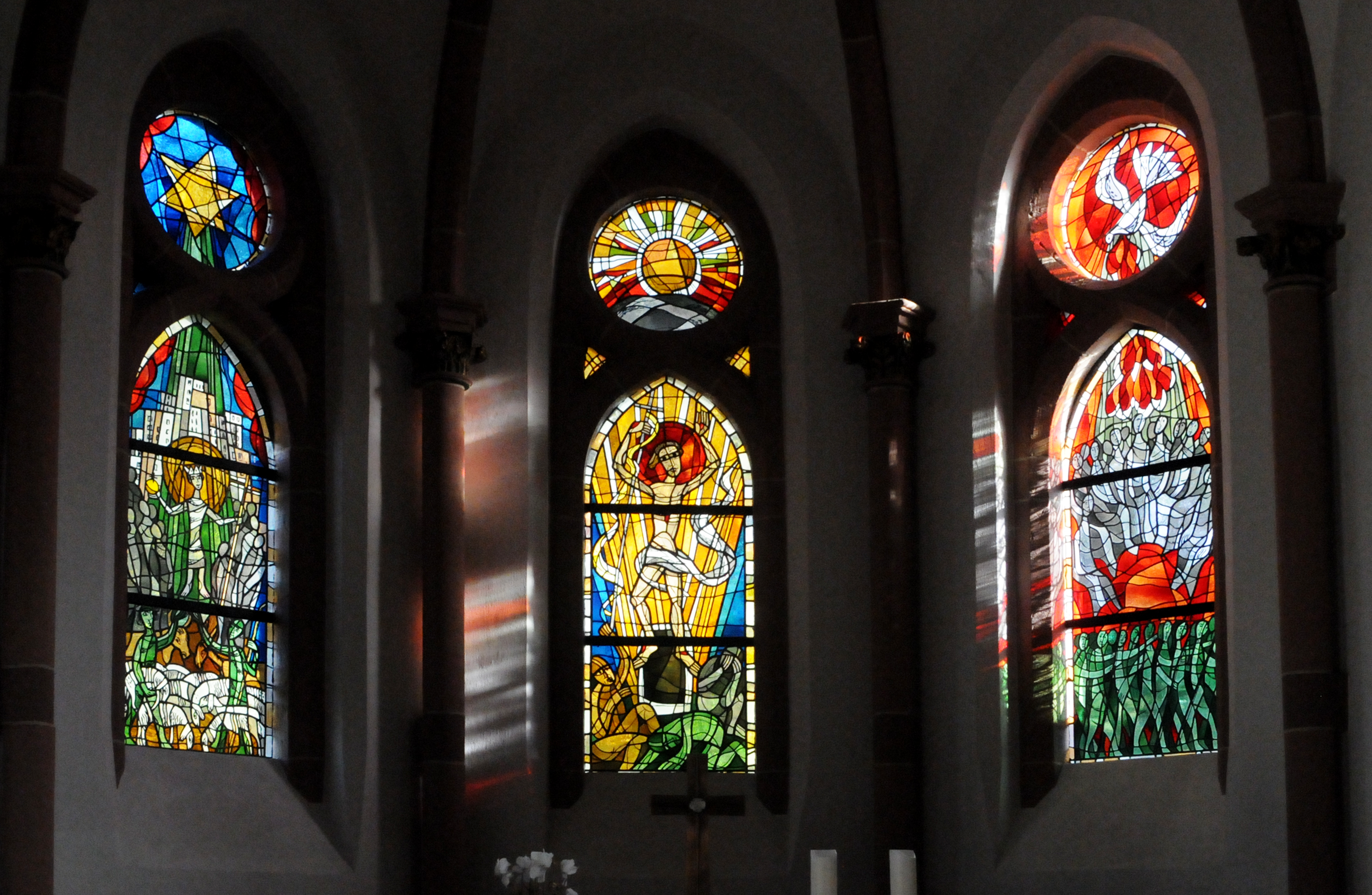
Stained glass by Werner Persy in the Protestant Church Saarburg

== Twin towns — sister cities ==
Saarburg is twinned with:

- Sarrebourg, France (1952)
- Soulac-sur-Mer, France (1972)

== Born in Saarburg ==
- Marianne Baum (1912–1942), resistance fighter against Nazism
- Alexander von Warsberg (1836–1889), Austrian government official and travel writer
