= Hentern =

- Municipality
- Coat of arms

- Location of Hentern within Trier-Saarburg district
- Interactive map of Hentern
- Location within Germany Location within Rhineland-Palatinate
- Coordinates: 49°37′2.4″N 6°41′36.47″E
- Country: Germany
- State: Rhineland-Palatinate
- District: Trier-Saarburg
- Municipal assoc.: Saarburg-Kell

Government
  - Mayor (2019–24): Michael Marx

Area
  - Total: 6.15 km^{2} (2.37 sq mi)
- Elevation: 340 m (1,120 ft)

Population (2025-12-31)
  - Total: 443
  - Density: 72.0/km^{2} (187/sq mi)
- Time zone: UTC+01:00 (CET)
  - Summer (DST): UTC+02:00 (CEST)
- Postal codes: 54314
- Dialling codes: 06587
- Vehicle registration: TR
- Website: www.hentern.de

Hentern is a municipality in the Trier-Saarburg district, in Rhineland-Palatinate, Germany.

== History ==
From 18 July 1946 to 6 June 1947 Hentern, in its then municipal boundary, formed part of the Saar Protectorate.
