= Paschel =

- Municipality
- Coat of arms

- Location of Paschel within Trier-Saarburg district
- Interactive map of Paschel
- Location within Germany Location within Rhineland-Palatinate
- Coordinates: 49°38′22″N 6°41′27″E
- Country: Germany
- State: Rhineland-Palatinate
- District: Trier-Saarburg
- Municipal assoc.: Saarburg-Kell

Government
  - Mayor (2019–24): Maurice Meysenburg

Area
  - Total: 4.30 km^{2} (1.66 sq mi)
- Elevation: 440 m (1,440 ft)

Population (2025-12-31)
  - Total: 227
  - Density: 52.8/km^{2} (137/sq mi)
- Time zone: UTC+01:00 (CET)
  - Summer (DST): UTC+02:00 (CEST)
- Postal codes: 54314
- Dialling codes: 06587
- Vehicle registration: TR
- Website: www.kell-am-see.de

Paschel is a municipality in the Trier-Saarburg district, in Rhineland-Palatinate, Germany.

== History ==
From 18 July 1946 to 6 June 1947 Paschel, in its then municipal boundary, formed part of the Saar Protectorate.
