= Mandern =

- Municipality
- Coat of arms

- Location of Mandern within Trier-Saarburg district
- Interactive map of Mandern
- Location within Germany Location within Rhineland-Palatinate
- Coordinates: 49°36′23″N 6°46′12″E
- Country: Germany
- State: Rhineland-Palatinate
- District: Trier-Saarburg
- Municipal assoc.: Saarburg-Kell

Government
  - Mayor (2019–24): Tim Kohley (CDU)

Area
  - Total: 23.96 km^{2} (9.25 sq mi)
- Elevation: 443 m (1,453 ft)

Population (2025-12-31)
  - Total: 820
  - Density: 34/km^{2} (89/sq mi)
- Time zone: UTC+01:00 (CET)
  - Summer (DST): UTC+02:00 (CEST)
- Postal codes: 54429
- Dialling codes: 06589
- Vehicle registration: TR
- Website: www.kell-am-see.de

Mandern is a municipality in the Trier-Saarburg district, in Rhineland-Palatinate, Germany.
