= Mannebach =

- Municipality
- Coat of arms

- Location of Mannebach within Trier-Saarburg district
- Interactive map of Mannebach
- Location within Germany Location within Rhineland-Palatinate
- Coordinates: 49°38′06″N 6°30′34″E
- Country: Germany
- State: Rhineland-Palatinate
- District: Trier-Saarburg
- Municipal assoc.: Saarburg-Kell

Government
  - Mayor (2019–24): Thomas Lellig

Area
  - Total: 6.05 km^{2} (2.34 sq mi)
- Elevation: 250 m (820 ft)

Population (2025-12-31)
  - Total: 342
  - Density: 56.5/km^{2} (146/sq mi)
- Time zone: UTC+01:00 (CET)
  - Summer (DST): UTC+02:00 (CEST)
- Postal codes: 54441
- Dialling codes: 06581
- Vehicle registration: TR
- Website: www.mannebach.info

Mannebach (German pronunciation: [ˈmanəbax]) is a municipality in the Trier-Saarburg district, in Rhineland-Palatinate, Germany.

== History ==
From 18 July 1946 to 6 June 1947 Mannebach, in its then municipal boundary, formed part of the Saar Protectorate.
