= Trassem =

- Municipality
- Coat of arms

- Location of Trassem within Trier-Saarburg district
- Interactive map of Trassem
- Location within Germany Location within Rhineland-Palatinate
- Coordinates: 49°34′42″N 6°31′30″E
- Country: Germany
- State: Rhineland-Palatinate
- District: Trier-Saarburg
- Municipal assoc.: Saarburg-Kell
- Subdivisions: 2

Government
  - Mayor (2019–24): Roland Konter (CDU)

Area
  - Total: 7.53 km^{2} (2.91 sq mi)
- Elevation: 180 m (590 ft)

Population (2025-12-31)
  - Total: 1,122
  - Density: 149/km^{2} (386/sq mi)
- Time zone: UTC+01:00 (CET)
  - Summer (DST): UTC+02:00 (CEST)
- Postal codes: 54441
- Dialling codes: 06581
- Vehicle registration: TR
- Website: www.trassem.de

Trassem is a municipality in the Trier-Saarburg district, in Rhineland-Palatinate, Germany.
