= Kells railway station (County Meath) =

Former railway station, Ireland

Kells

General information
- Location: County Meath; Ireland
- Coordinates: 53.7220°N 6.8811°W

History
- Original company: Dublin and Drogheda Railway
- Pre-grouping: Great Northern Railway

Key dates
- 11 July 1853: Station opens
- 14 April 1958: Station closes for passengers
- 1 April 1963: Station closes
Location

Kells railway station was a railway station in Kells, County Meath, Ireland. The station opened in 1853. It was established by the Dublin and Drogheda Railway to serve a new branch from the Dublin–Navan railway line. The branch was closed to passengers in 1958, and closed for all uses in 1963.

Preceding station	Historical railways	Following station
Ballybeg	Dublin and Drogheda Railway; Oldcastle branch line	Virginia Road
