= Kirf =

- Municipality
- Coat of arms

- Location of Kirf within Trier-Saarburg district
- Interactive map of Kirf
- Location within Germany Location within Rhineland-Palatinate
- Coordinates: 49°33′4.17″N 6°28′45.25″E
- Country: Germany
- State: Rhineland-Palatinate
- District: Trier-Saarburg
- Municipal assoc.: Saarburg-Kell

Government
  - Mayor (2019–24): Reinhold Anton (FW)

Area
  - Total: 19.15 km^{2} (7.39 sq mi)
- Elevation: 320 m (1,050 ft)

Population (2025-12-31)
  - Total: 834
  - Density: 43.6/km^{2} (113/sq mi)
- Time zone: UTC+01:00 (CET)
  - Summer (DST): UTC+02:00 (CEST)
- Postal codes: 54441
- Dialling codes: 06582, 06583
- Vehicle registration: TR
- Website: www.vg-saarburg.de

Kirf is a municipality in the Trier-Saarburg district, in Rhineland-Palatinate, Germany.

== History ==
From 18 July 1946 to 6 June 1947, Kirf – in its then-municipal boundary – formed part of the Saar Protectorate.
