= Kastel-Staadt =

- Municipality
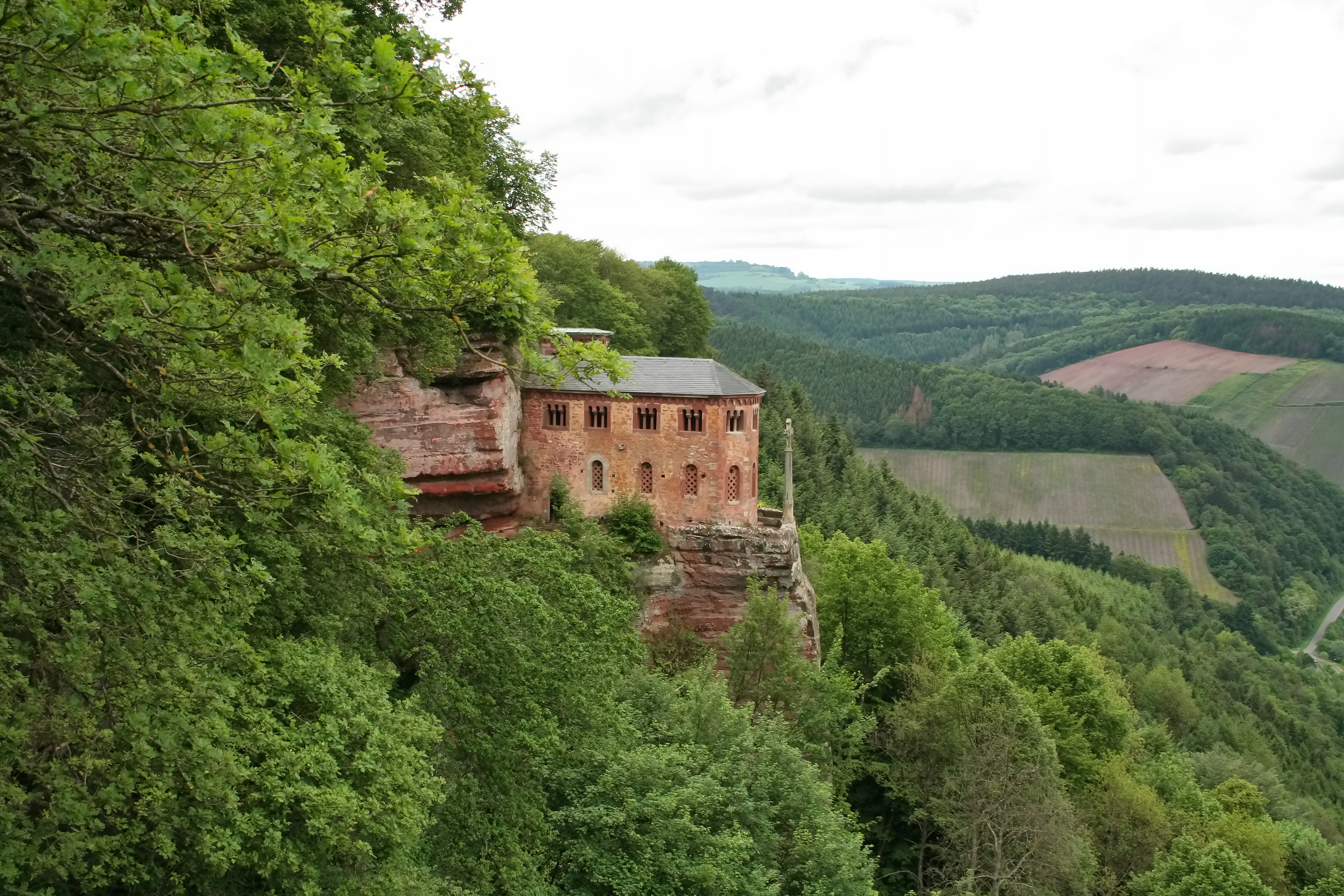
- 19th-century former tomb of John of Bohemia

- Coat of arms

- Location of Kastel-Staadt within Trier-Saarburg district
- Interactive map of Kastel-Staadt
- Location within Germany Location within Rhineland-Palatinate
- Coordinates: 49°33′53″N 6°33′35″E
- Country: Germany
- State: Rhineland-Palatinate
- District: Trier-Saarburg
- Municipal assoc.: Saarburg-Kell

Government
  - Mayor (2019–24): Reiner Schmitt

Area
  - Total: 5.23 km^{2} (2.02 sq mi)
- Elevation: 330 m (1,080 ft)

Population (2025-12-31)
  - Total: 425
  - Density: 81.3/km^{2} (210/sq mi)
- Time zone: UTC+01:00 (CET)
  - Summer (DST): UTC+02:00 (CEST)
- Postal codes: 54441
- Dialling codes: 06582
- Vehicle registration: TR
- Website: www.kastel-staadt.de

Kastel-Staadt is a municipality in the Trier-Saarburg district, in Rhineland-Palatinate, Germany.

== History ==
From 18 July 1946 to 6 June 1947 Kastel-Staad, in its then municipal boundary, formed part of the Saar Protectorate.
