= Greimerath, Trier-Saarburg =

Greimerath
- Municipality
- Coat of arms

- Location of Greimerath within Trier-Saarburg district
- Interactive map of Greimerath
- Location within Germany Location within Rhineland-Palatinate
- Coordinates: 49°33′42.58″N 6°41′0.7″E
- Country: Germany
- State: Rhineland-Palatinate
- District: Trier-Saarburg
- Municipal assoc.: Saarburg-Kell

Government
  - Mayor (2019–24): Edmund Schmitt

Area
  - Total: 12.26 km^{2} (4.73 sq mi)
- Elevation: 430 m (1,410 ft)

Population (2025-12-31)
  - Total: 964
  - Density: 78.6/km^{2} (204/sq mi)
- Time zone: UTC+01:00 (CET)
  - Summer (DST): UTC+02:00 (CEST)
- Postal codes: 54314
- Dialling codes: 06587
- Vehicle registration: TR
- Website: Gemeinde Greimerath

Greimerath (German pronunciation: [ˈɡʁaɪməʁaːt]) is a municipality in the Trier-Saarburg district, in Rhineland-Palatinate, Germany.

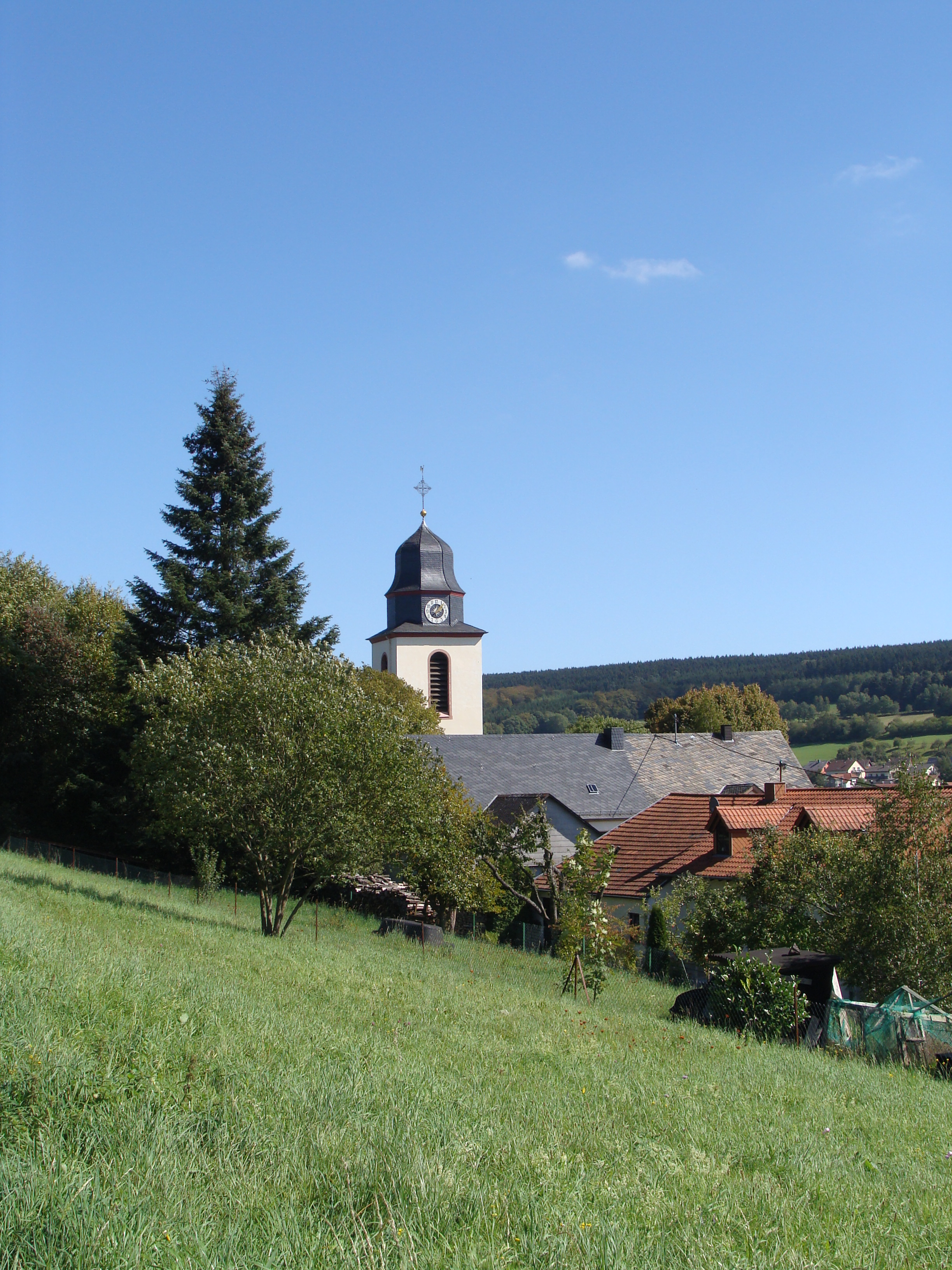
Greimerath, church St. Nikolaus.

== History ==
From 18 July 1946 to 6 June 1947 Greimerath, in its then municipal boundary, formed part of the Saar Protectorate.
