= Rob Kell =

English civil engineer

John Robert Kell, CBE (1902–1983) was an English civil engineer with particular expertise in the field of heating, ventilation and air conditioning.

Kell joined the firm of Oscar Faber & Partners in 1926, after a period as a contractor, and rose to become a Partner in 1948. In 1936 he co-wrote the standard textbook Heating and air conditioning of Buildings with Oscar Faber. He also wrote the entry on heating, ventilation and air conditioning for the Encyclopædia Britannica.

He was responsible for the building services design for the Bank of England, including on site electricity generation with waste heat recovery and the (12 acre) Earls Court Exhibition Centre, notably the special ventilating jet nozzles (International Heating and Ventilation Engineering (IHVE) Journal, March 1938). He also designed the air conditioning for the rebuilt House of Commons (1943 – 1950), and the heating systems for numerous notable buildings including St Paul's Cathedral and St Albans Cathedral. He was president of IHVE in 1952, made CBE in 1966, awarded the IHVE Gold Medal in 1967.

Rob Kell lived in St Albans and was educated at St Albans School. He was married to Pamela and they had one son, Paul, now a theatre lighting designer. He had a long association with St Albans Cathedral, which he served for many years in various volunteer capacities, and has the unusual distinction (shared with Robert Runcie) of having his bust carved in stone among the Abbey's roof gargoyles.

== Sources ==
- HEVAC hall of fame
