= Kell am See =

- Municipality
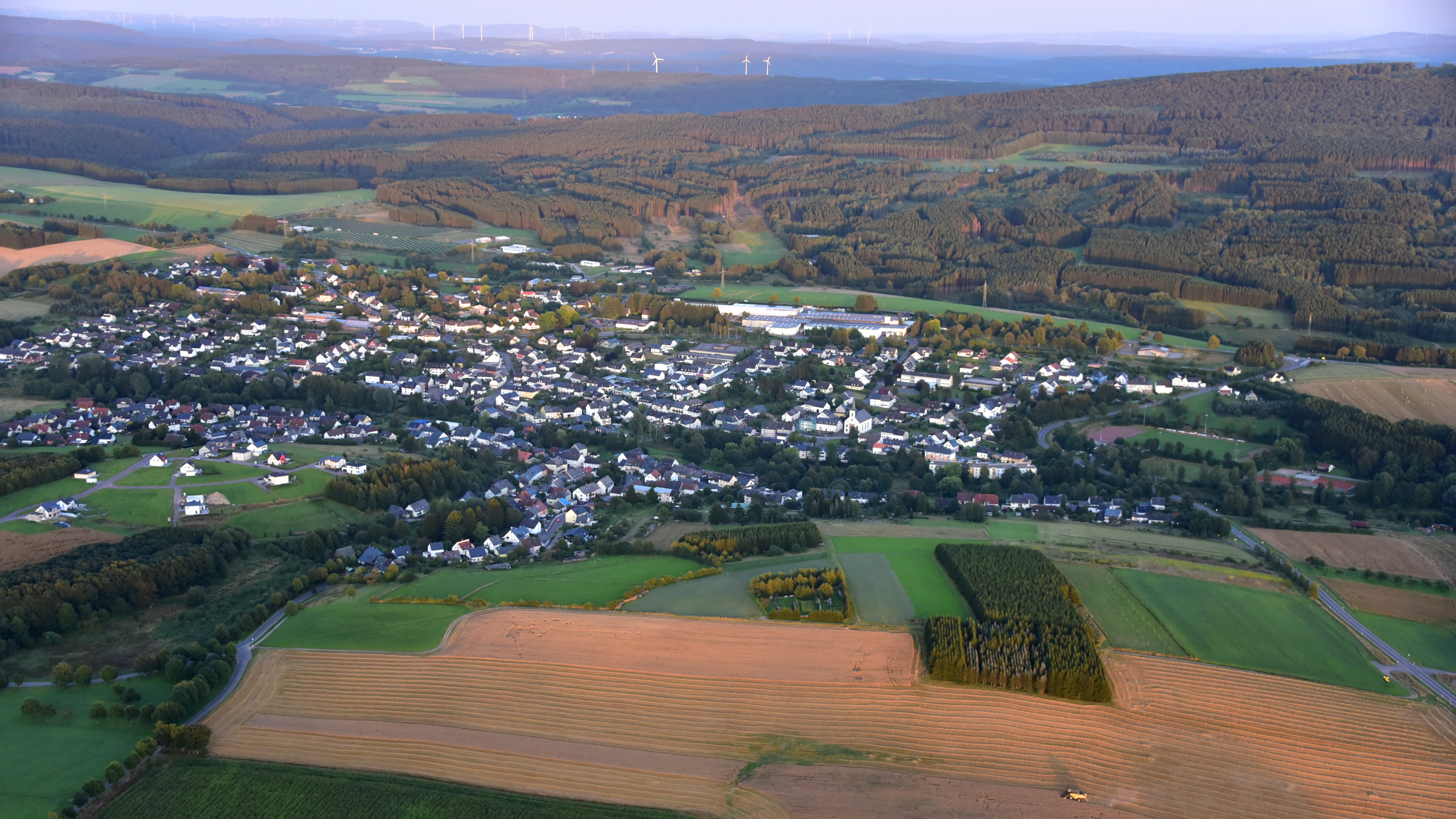
- Aerial view

- Coat of arms

- Location of Kell am See within Trier-Saarburg district
- Interactive map of Kell am See
- Location within Germany Location within Rhineland-Palatinate
- Coordinates: 49°38′0.3″N 6°49′20.13″E
- Country: Germany
- State: Rhineland-Palatinate
- District: Trier-Saarburg
- Municipal assoc.: Saarburg-Kell

Government
  - Mayor (2019–24): Markus Lehnen (CDU)

Area
  - Total: 28.26 km^{2} (10.91 sq mi)
- Elevation: 480 m (1,570 ft)

Population (2025-12-31)
  - Total: 1,895
  - Density: 67.06/km^{2} (173.7/sq mi)
- Time zone: UTC+01:00 (CET)
  - Summer (DST): UTC+02:00 (CEST)
- Postal codes: 54427
- Dialling codes: 06589
- Vehicle registration: TR
- Website: www.kellamsee.de

Kell am See is a municipality in the Trier-Saarburg district, in Rhineland-Palatinate, Germany. It is situated in the Hunsrück, approx. 20 km southeast of Trier.

Kell am See was the seat of the former Kell am See Verbandsgemeinde ("collective municipality").

Until 2013, there was a yearly festival in Kell which is called Highway To Kell.
