= Irsch =

- Municipality
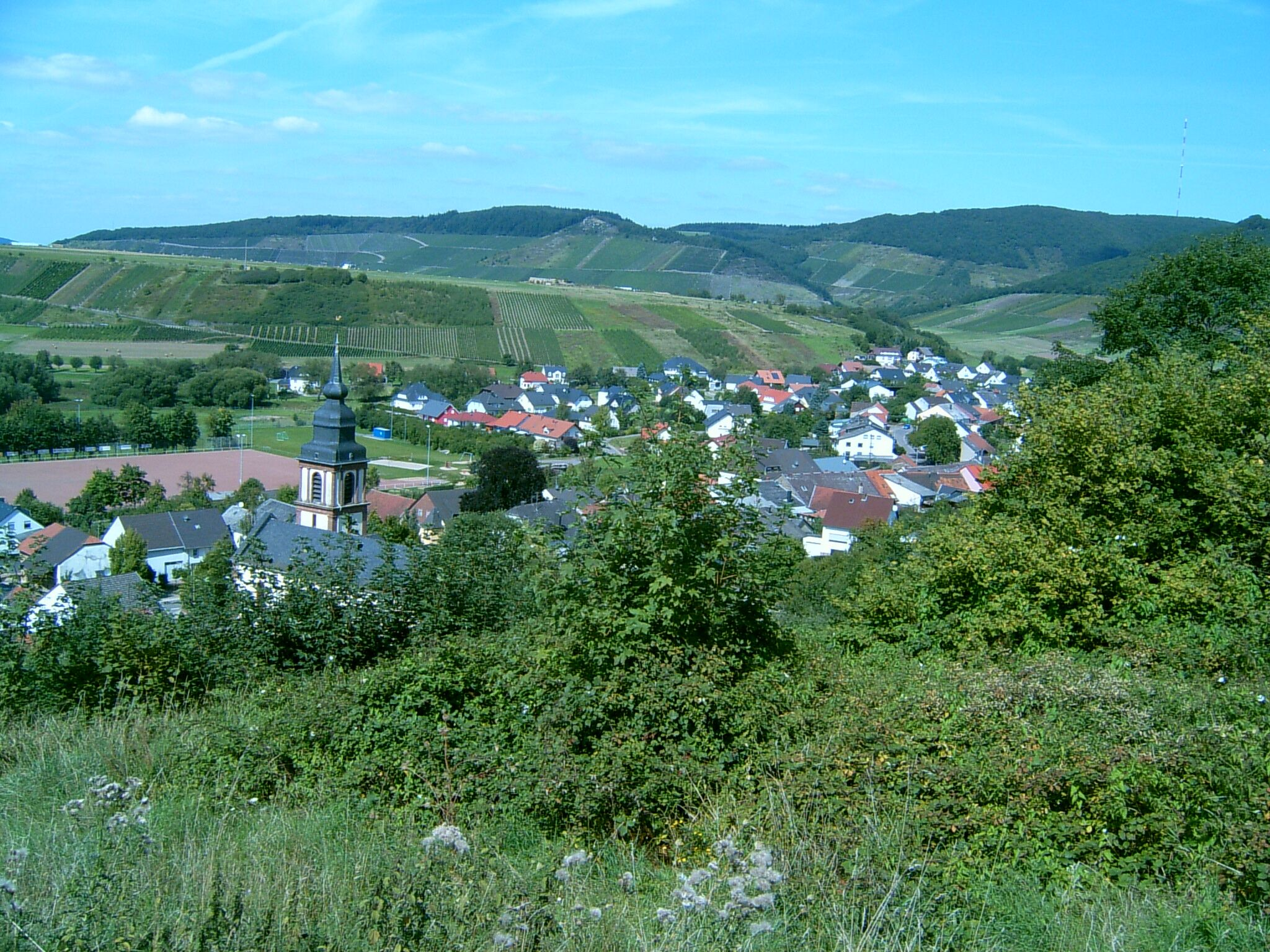

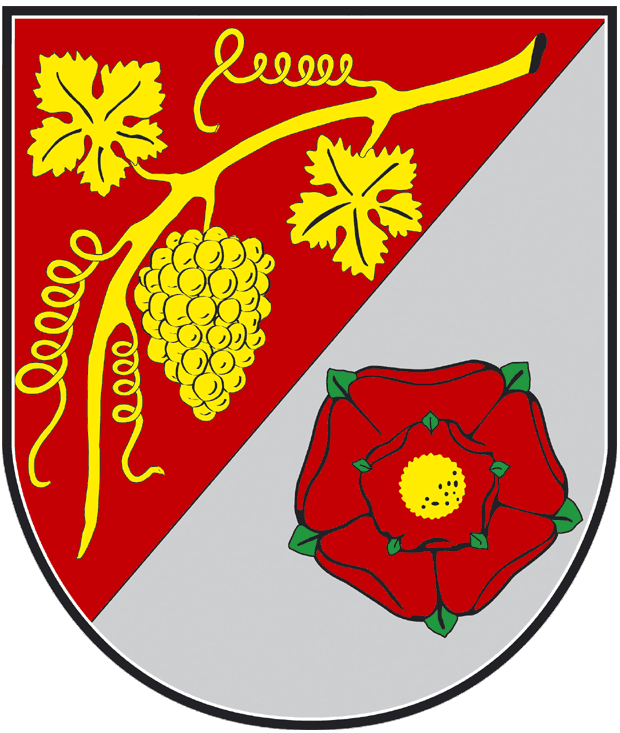
- Coat of arms

- Location of Irsch within Trier-Saarburg district
- Interactive map of Irsch
- Location within Germany Location within Rhineland-Palatinate
- Coordinates: 49°36′18″N 6°35′40″E
- Country: Germany
- State: Rhineland-Palatinate
- District: Trier-Saarburg
- Municipal assoc.: Saarburg-Kell

Government
  - Mayor (2019–24): Jürgen Haag

Area
  - Total: 15.21 km^{2} (5.87 sq mi)
- Elevation: 210 m (690 ft)

Population (2025-12-31)
  - Total: 1,645
  - Density: 108.2/km^{2} (280.1/sq mi)
- Time zone: UTC+01:00 (CET)
  - Summer (DST): UTC+02:00 (CEST)
- Postal codes: 54451
- Dialling codes: 06581
- Vehicle registration: TR
- Website: www.irsch-saar.de

Irsch is a municipality in the Trier-Saarburg district, in Rhineland-Palatinate, Germany.

== History ==
From 18 July 1946 to 6 June 1947 Irsch, in its then municipal boundary, formed part of the Saar Protectorate.
