= Ayl =

- Municipality
- Coat of arms

- Location of Ayl within Trier-Saarburg district
- Interactive map of Ayl
- Location within Germany Location within Rhineland-Palatinate
- Coordinates: 49°37′47.70″N 6°33′17.82″E
- Country: Germany
- State: Rhineland-Palatinate
- District: Trier-Saarburg
- Municipal assoc.: Saarburg-Kell

Government
  - Mayor (2019–24): Siegfried Büdinger

Area
  - Total: 7.58 km^{2} (2.93 sq mi)
- Elevation: 190 m (620 ft)

Population (2025-12-31)
  - Total: 1,574
  - Density: 208/km^{2} (538/sq mi)
- Time zone: UTC+01:00 (CET)
  - Summer (DST): UTC+02:00 (CEST)
- Postal codes: 54441
- Dialling codes: 06581
- Vehicle registration: TR
- Website: www.ayl.de

Ayl (German pronunciation: [aɪl]) is a municipality in the Trier-Saarburg district, in Rhineland-Palatinate, Germany.

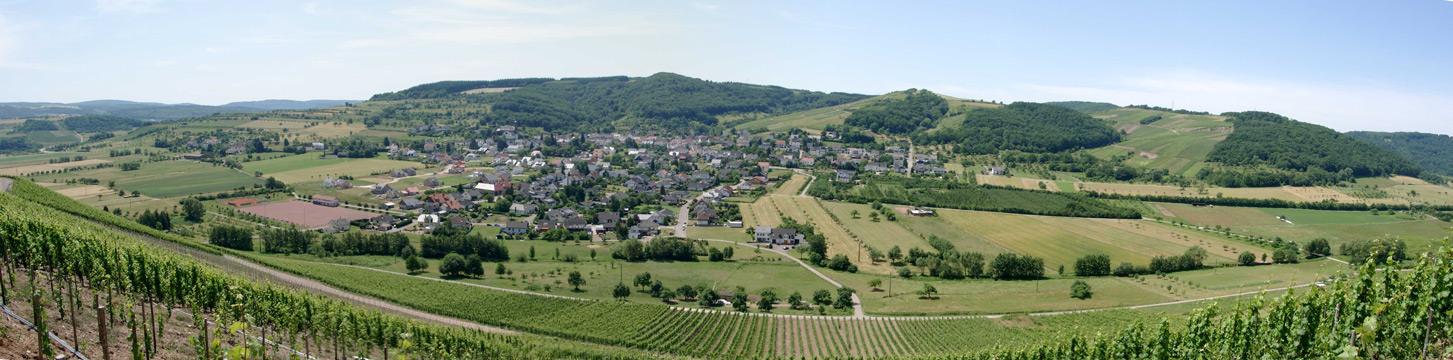
Panorama of Ayl from the Ayler Kupp

== History ==
From 18 July 1946 to 6 June 1947 Ayl, in its then municipal boundary, formed part of the Saar Protectorate.
