= Freudenburg =

- Municipality
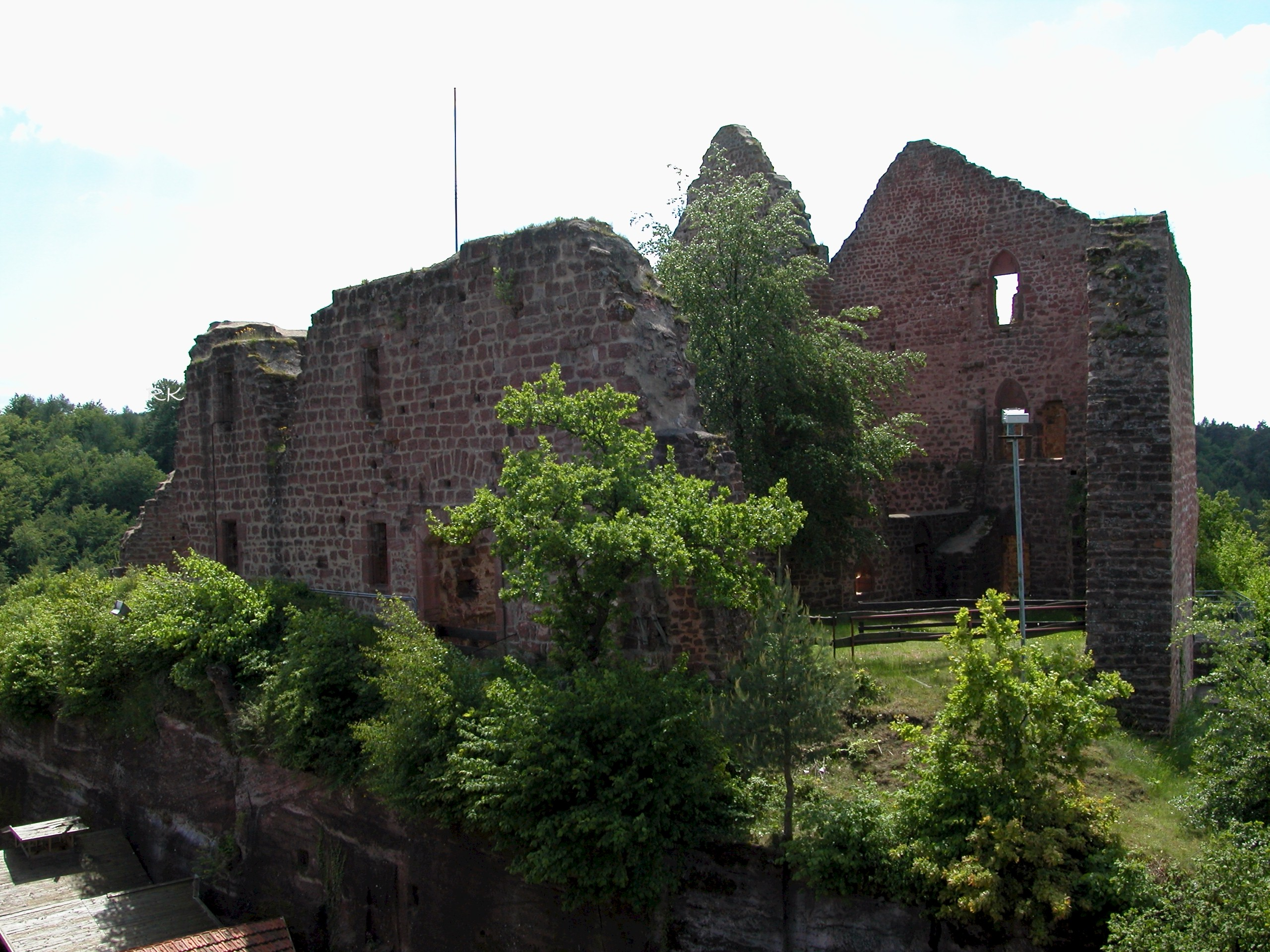

- Coat of arms

- Location of Freudenburg within Trier-Saarburg district
- Interactive map of Freudenburg
- Location within Germany Location within Rhineland-Palatinate
- Coordinates: 49°32′36″N 6°32′01″E
- Country: Germany
- State: Rhineland-Palatinate
- District: Trier-Saarburg
- Municipal assoc.: Saarburg-Kell
- Subdivisions: 2

Government
  - Mayor (2019–24): Alois Zehren

Area
  - Total: 11.00 km^{2} (4.25 sq mi)
- Elevation: 350 m (1,150 ft)

Population (2025-12-31)
  - Total: 1,799
  - Density: 163.5/km^{2} (423.6/sq mi)
- Time zone: UTC+01:00 (CET)
  - Summer (DST): UTC+02:00 (CEST)
- Postal codes: 54450
- Dialling codes: 06582
- Vehicle registration: TR
- Website: gemeinde-freudenburg.de

Freudenburg is a municipality in the Trier-Saarburg district, in Rhineland-Palatinate, Germany.

== Geographical location ==
The village lies at the foot of the Eiderberg, at an elevation of 439 metres. South of the main town lies the border to the adjacent state of Saarland. Saarburg, the administrative seat of the municipality, is located about seven kilometres north-northeast. The area has a large number of hiking trails and old castle ruins. The village consists of an old town on the higher incline with many structures dating back to early 19th century and a newer conurbation of houses built from around 2005 on the other side of the town, heading towards the valley of Kollesleuken. The oldest structure, the old castle fort, dates back to the early 14th century.

== History ==
In 1337 King John of Bohemia, Count of Luxembourg, built "Freudenburg" at the foot of the Eiderberg, at that time called "Freyding". As part of a castle protectorate between Trier and Luxembourg, it served to secure the Heerstraße Trier-Metz. As early as 1346 Freudenburg was referred to as a "city" in the context of a collective privilege of the Archdiocese. As a small farming town, Freudenburg took over central functions for the surrounding villages. With the purchase of the castle county "Freyding" by the imperial abbey of St. Maximin, the castle was rebuilt. In the dispute between the abbey and Elector Philipp Christoph von Sötern the castle was occupied in 1646 by Trier Archdiocese troops, destroyed and was not rebuilt. The community of Hospitals were assigned the ruins as part of a secularization exercise, which they later sold in 1861 to the local authority. The local authority then carried out restructuring and stabilization of the site in 1908 and again in 1980.

On 18 July 1946 Freudenburg was affiliated with another 80 municipalities across Trier and Saarburg Counties that, earlier, in February 1946 had been separated from the rest of the French occupation zone Saar territory, which was by then no longer under the Allied Control Council . On 6 June 1947 this territorial spin-off was reduced to 21 municipalities. In 1946 Freudenburg joined the newly formed state Rheinland-Pfalz (Rhineland-Palatinate.)

On 7 June 1969 a part of the local authority of Kirf with 101 inhabitants was re-joined to Freudenburg.

== Population growth ==
The development of the population of Freudenburg based on the current municipality, the values from 1871 to 1987 based on censuses:

Year	Inhabitants
1815	676
1835	906
1871	941
1905	1.154
1939	1.358

Year	Inhabitants
1950	1.396
1961	1.533
1970	1.626
1987	1.488
2005	1.496

== Local council ==
The local council in Freudenburg consists of 16 council members, who were elected in the local election on 25 May 2014 in a personalized proportional representation election, and the honorary mayor as chairman.

The distribution of seats in the local council:

Wahl	SPD	CDU	UWF	WGR	Gesamt
2014	9	–	4	3	16 seats
2009	9	–	4	3	16 seats
2004	9	4	3	–	16 seats

- UWF = Unabhängige Wählergruppe Freudenburg e.V (Freudenburg independent voter group.)

== Local sightseeing ==
- The ruins of the old castle from the 14th century.
- A local private house contains a Jewish Mikve a remnant from the old Jewish community of the town
- Above the town centre (signposted) there is a Jewish cemetery first documented in 1694.
- In the nearby district of Kollesleuken on the river Leukbach there is an old mill "Herrenmühle", a successor of the Maximiner Mühle, that was destroyed in 1944. The mill is privately owned and since the end of the seventies was no longer in production.
- The nature reserve Eiderberg with many species of orchid
- Rock formations in the Leuktal (Kollesleuker's Switzerland) above the Herrenmühle
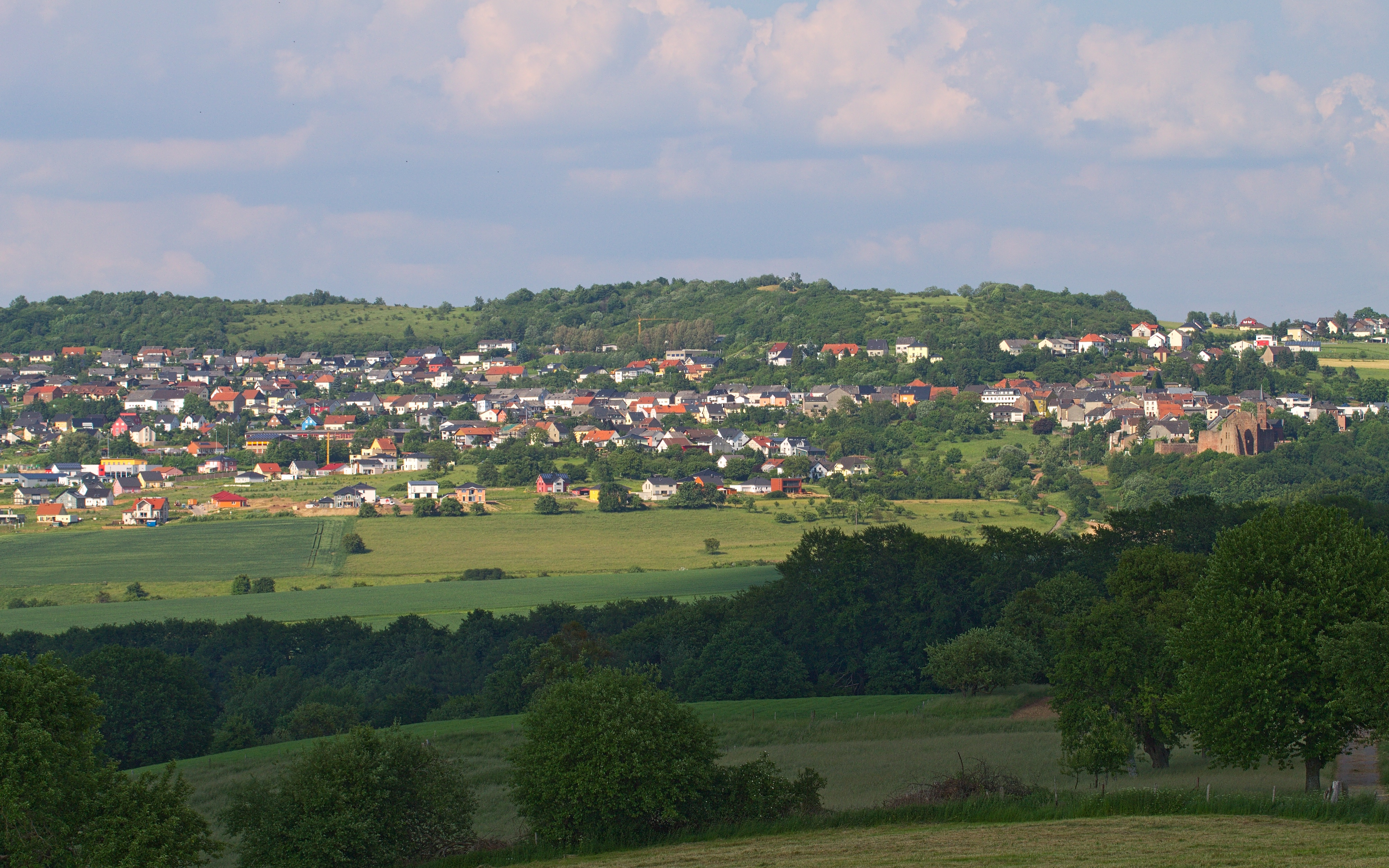
Freudenburg, on the right the castle ruins and church

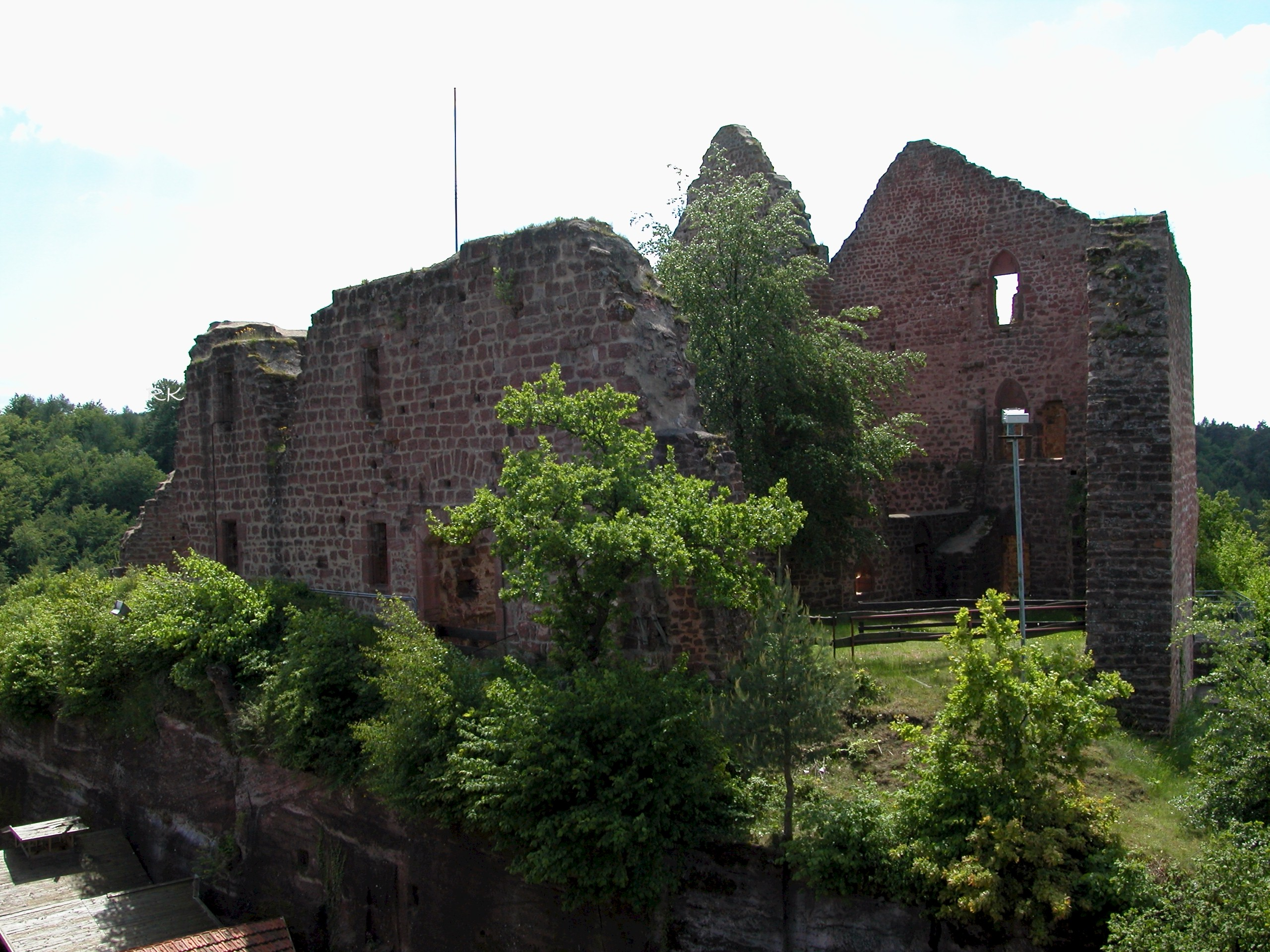
Freudenburg fort ruins

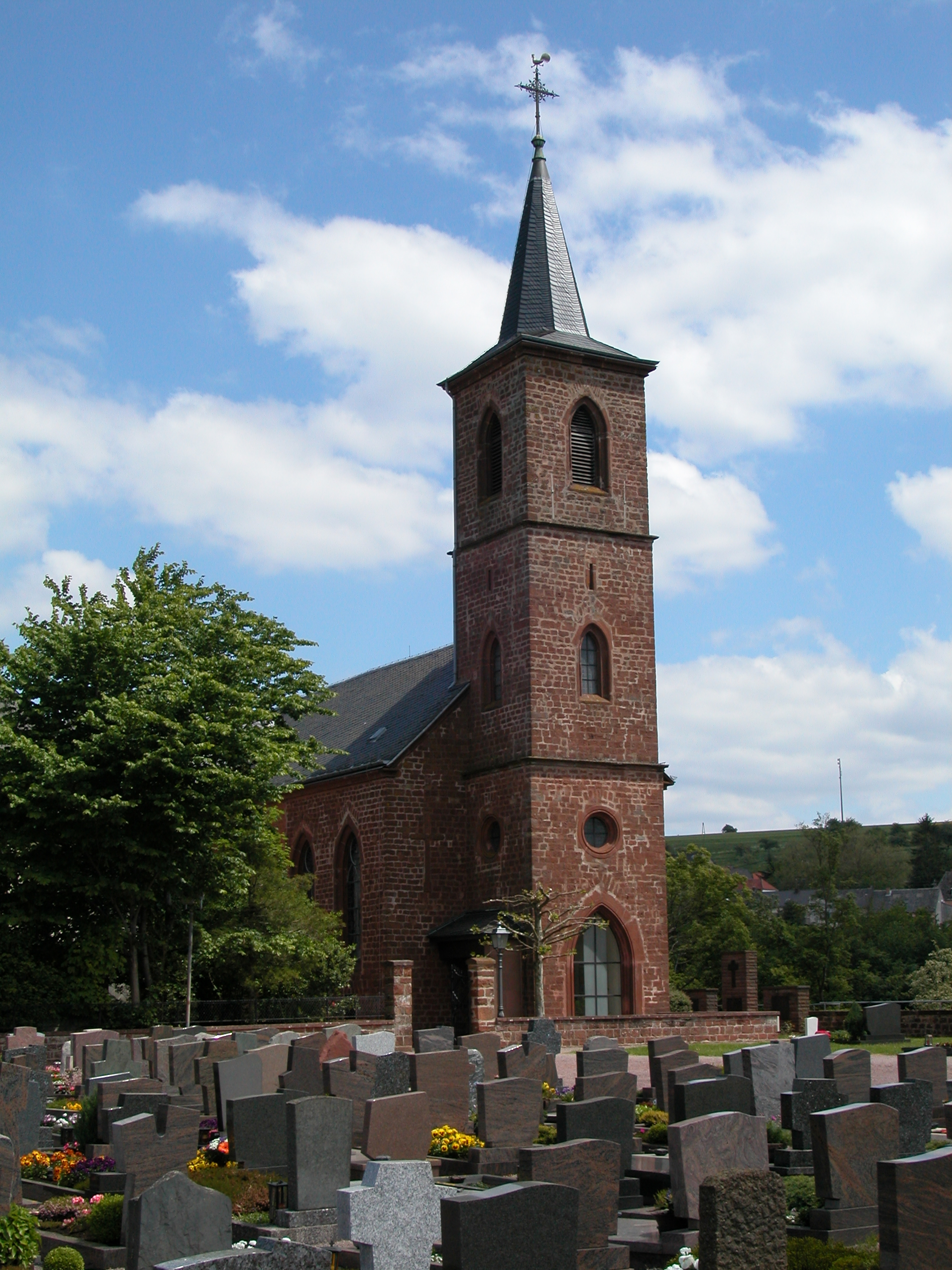
Catholic parish church of the Holy Trinity

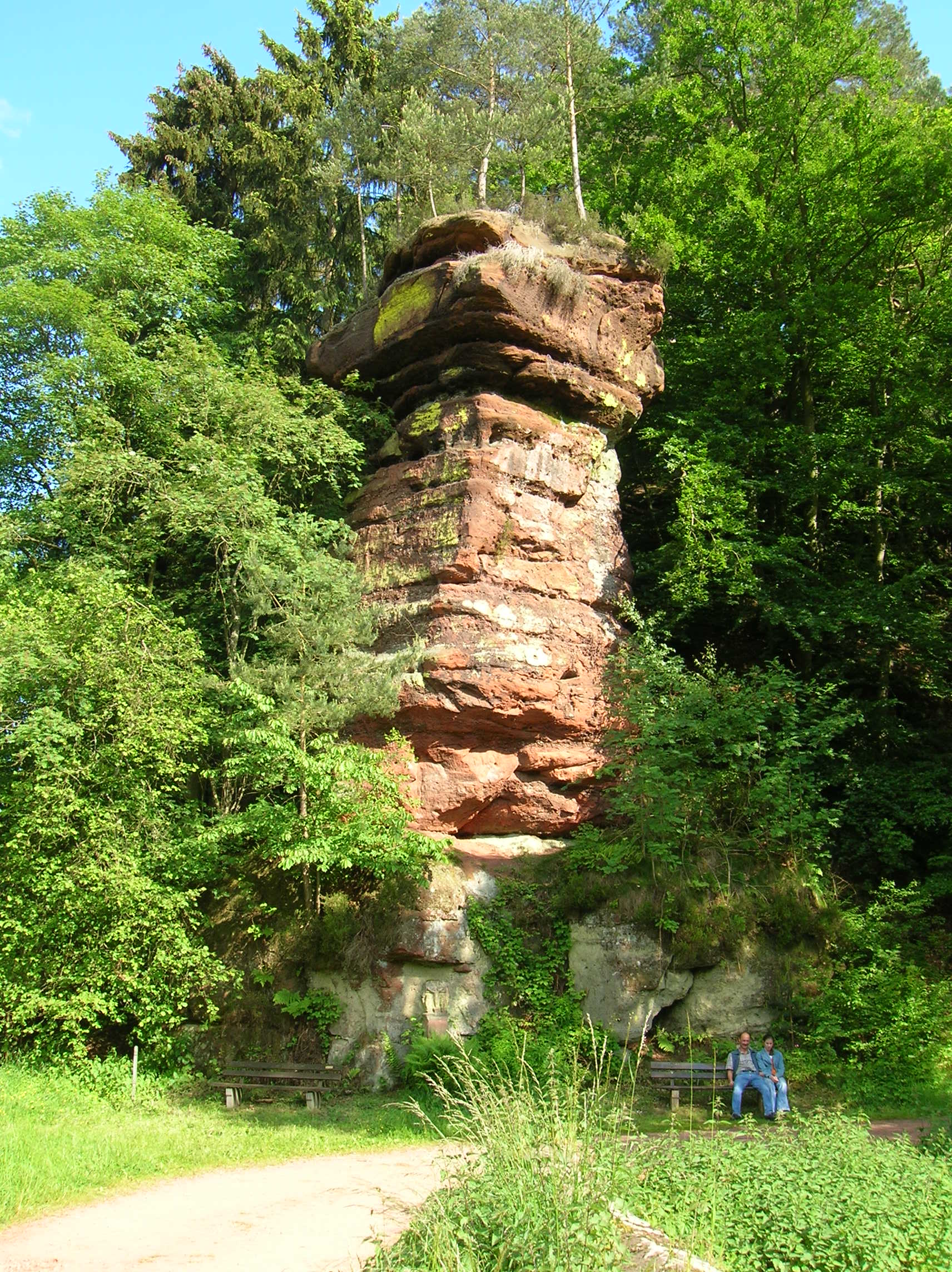
Mushroom rock formation in the "Kollesleuker Schweiz" (Kollesleuken's Switzerland)

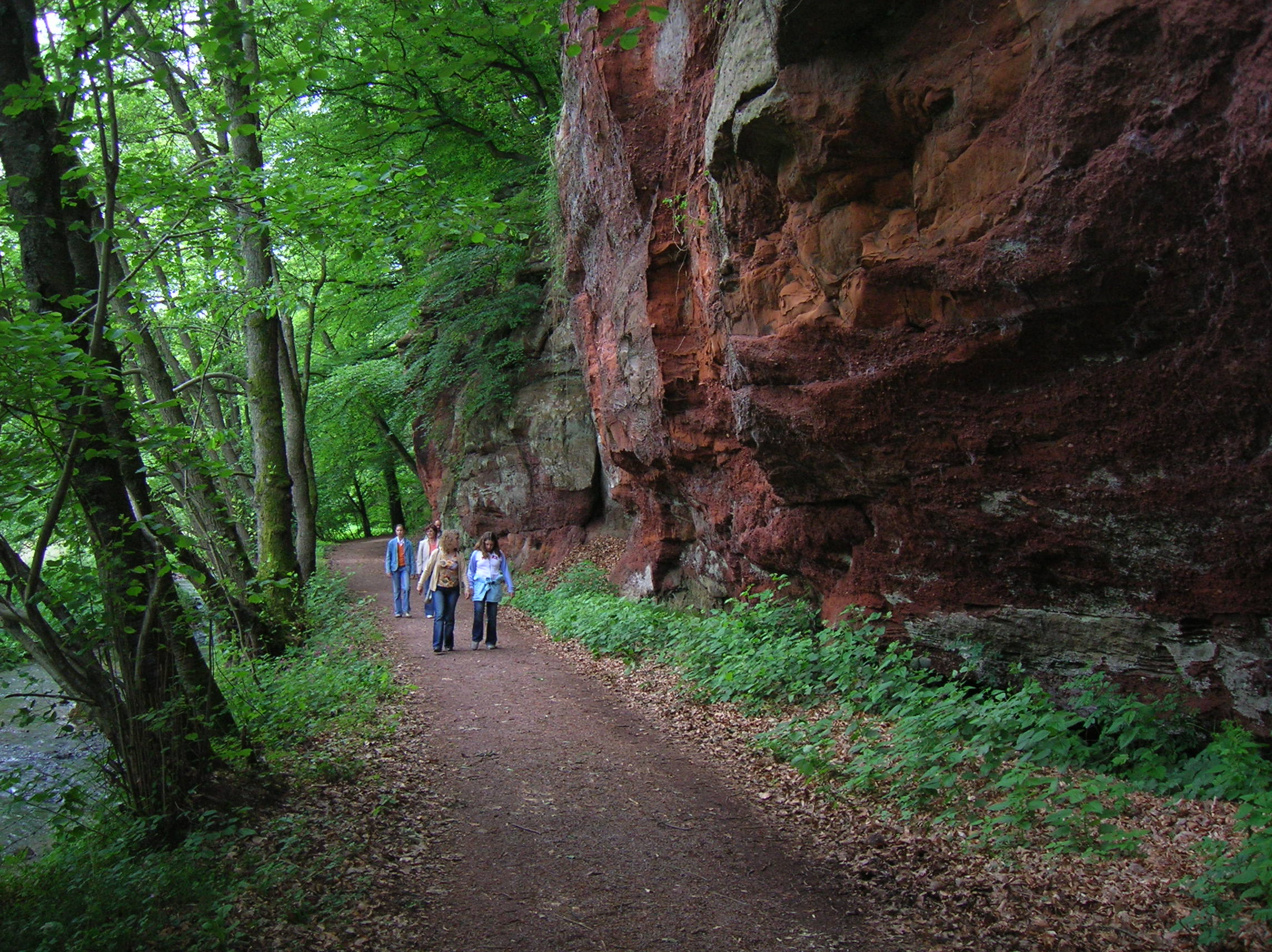
ock formation in Leuktal

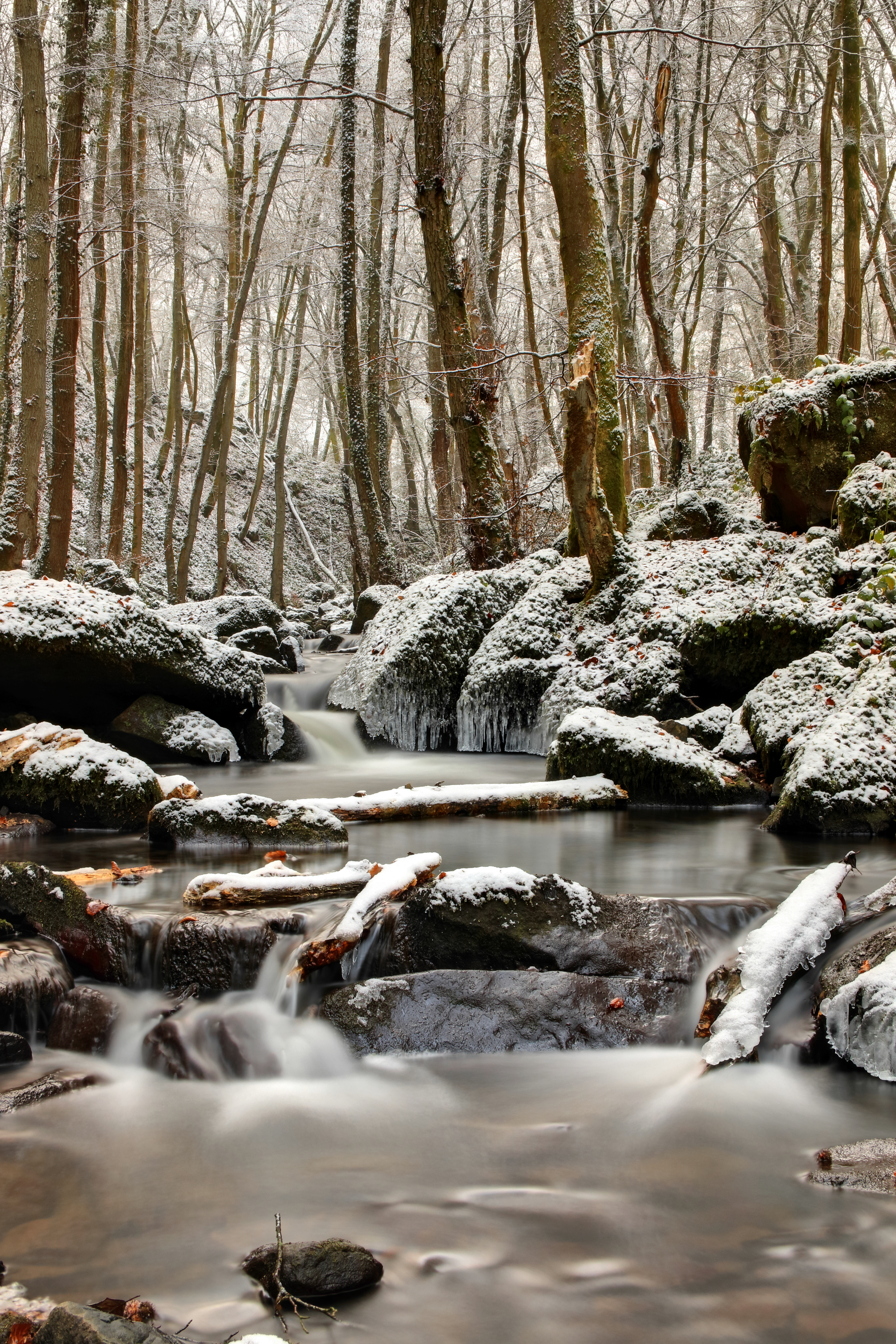
Winter in Leukbachtal

== Public and sports facilities ==
Freudenburg has a primary school, a football club as well as a kindergarten and children's playgrounds. For leisure activities there are two tennis courts, a gym and a sports field.

== Economy ==
Construction companies and small businesses (auto-garages, bakery, bistro, hairdressers, large furniture store) as well as service companies characterize the local working life.

== Twin towns – sister cities ==
- Appoigny, France
