= Zerf =

- Municipality
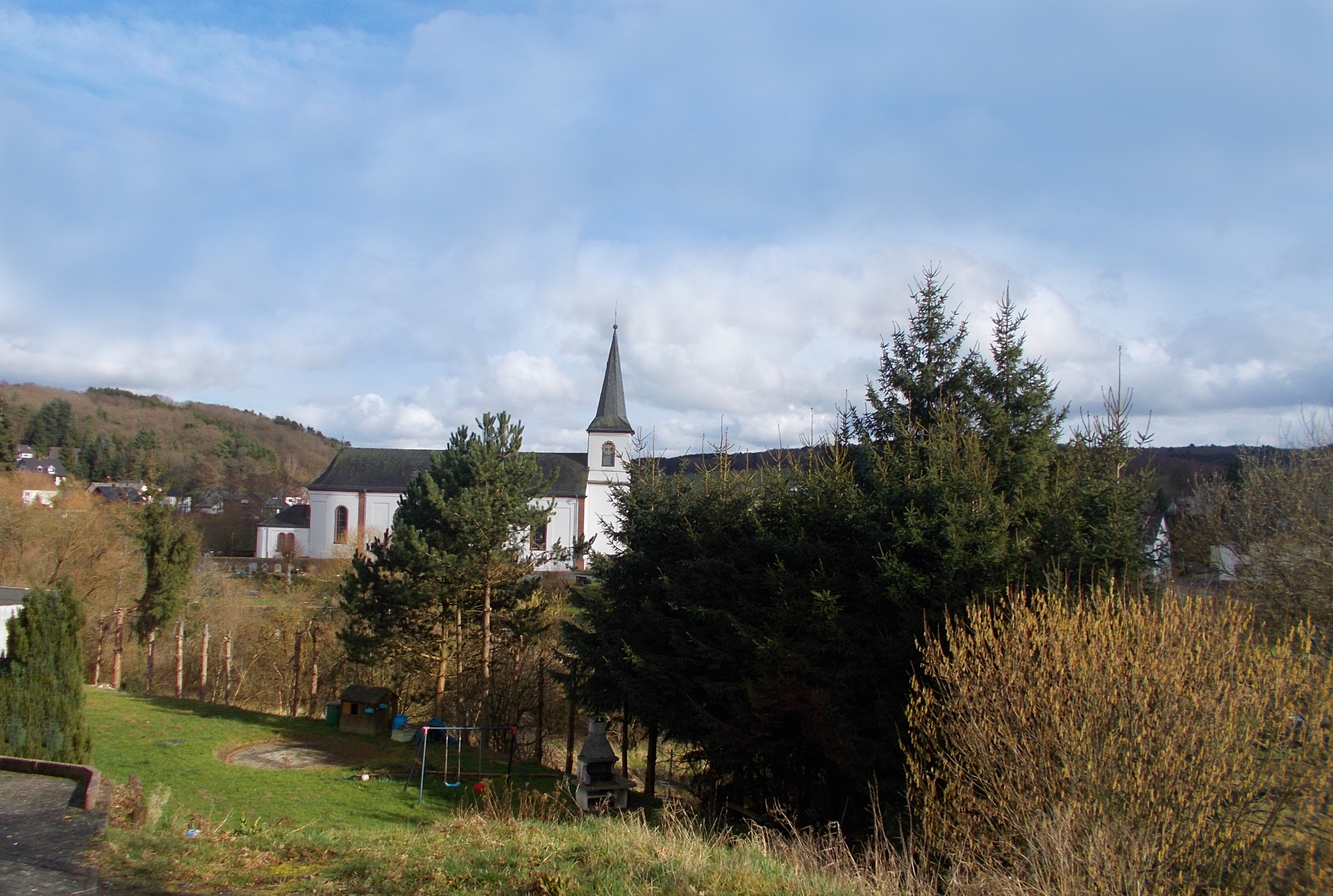

- Coat of arms

- Location of Zerf within Trier-Saarburg district
- Interactive map of Zerf
- Location within Germany Location within Rhineland-Palatinate
- Coordinates: 49°36′3″N 6°41′17″E
- Country: Germany
- State: Rhineland-Palatinate
- District: Trier-Saarburg
- Municipal assoc.: Saarburg-Kell

Government
  - Mayor (2019–24): Rainer Hansen (CDU)

Area
  - Total: 28.87 km^{2} (11.15 sq mi)
- Elevation: 340 m (1,120 ft)

Population (2025-12-31)
  - Total: 1,513
  - Density: 52.41/km^{2} (135.7/sq mi)
- Time zone: UTC+01:00 (CET)
  - Summer (DST): UTC+02:00 (CEST)
- Postal codes: 54314
- Dialling codes: 06587
- Vehicle registration: TR
- Website: www.gemeinde-zerf.de

Zerf is a municipality in the Trier-Saarburg district, in Rhineland-Palatinate, Germany.

== History ==
From 18 July 1946 to 6 June 1947 Zerf, in its then municipal boundary, formed part of the Saar Protectorate.
