= Serrig =

- Municipality
- Coat of arms

- Location of Serrig within Trier-Saarburg district
- Interactive map of Serrig
- Location within Germany Location within Rhineland-Palatinate
- Coordinates: 49°34′29″N 6°34′24″E
- Country: Germany
- State: Rhineland-Palatinate
- District: Trier-Saarburg
- Municipal assoc.: Saarburg-Kell

Government
  - Mayor (2019–24): Karl Heinz Pinter

Area
  - Total: 17.63 km^{2} (6.81 sq mi)
- Elevation: 160 m (520 ft)

Population (2025-12-31)
  - Total: 1,576
  - Density: 89.39/km^{2} (231.5/sq mi)
- Time zone: UTC+01:00 (CET)
  - Summer (DST): UTC+02:00 (CEST)
- Postal codes: 54455
- Dialling codes: 06581
- Vehicle registration: TR
- Website: www.serrig.de

Serrig is a municipality in the Trier-Saarburg district, in Rhineland-Palatinate, Germany.

== History ==
From 18 July 1946 to 6 June 1947 Serrig, in its then municipal boundary, formed part of the Saar Protectorate.
