= Waldweiler =

- Municipality
- Coat of arms

- Location of Waldweiler within Trier-Saarburg district
- Interactive map of Waldweiler
- Location within Germany Location within Rhineland-Palatinate
- Coordinates: 49°36′46″N 6°47′57″E
- Country: Germany
- State: Rhineland-Palatinate
- District: Trier-Saarburg
- Municipal assoc.: Saarburg-Kell

Government
  - Mayor (2019–24): Manfred Rauber

Area
  - Total: 11.08 km^{2} (4.28 sq mi)
- Elevation: 497 m (1,631 ft)

Population (2025-12-31)
  - Total: 841
  - Density: 75.9/km^{2} (197/sq mi)
- Time zone: UTC+01:00 (CET)
  - Summer (DST): UTC+02:00 (CEST)
- Postal codes: 54429
- Dialling codes: 06589
- Vehicle registration: TR
- Website: www.kell-am-see.de

Waldweiler is a municipality in the Trier-Saarburg district, in Rhineland-Palatinate, Germany.
