= Lampaden =

- Municipality
- Coat of arms

- Location of Lampaden within Trier-Saarburg district
- Interactive map of Lampaden
- Location within Germany Location within Rhineland-Palatinate
- Coordinates: 49°38′55″N 6°42′7″E
- Country: Germany
- State: Rhineland-Palatinate
- District: Trier-Saarburg
- Municipal assoc.: Saarburg-Kell

Government
  - Mayor (2019–24): Martin Marx

Area
  - Total: 8.16 km^{2} (3.15 sq mi)
- Elevation: 420 m (1,380 ft)

Population (2025-12-31)
  - Total: 563
  - Density: 69.0/km^{2} (179/sq mi)
- Time zone: UTC+01:00 (CET)
  - Summer (DST): UTC+02:00 (CEST)
- Postal codes: 54316
- Dialling codes: 06588
- Vehicle registration: TR
- Website: lampaden.de

Lampaden is a municipality in the Trier-Saarburg district, in Rhineland-Palatinate, Germany. The village is over a thousand years old and acquired grazing rights in the year 1036. The area was already populated in Celtic and Roman times.

During World War II, the only two operational V3 cannons used to bombard Luxembourg were installed in a wooded ravine of the river Ruwer at Lampaden about 13 kilometres (8.1 mi) southeast of Trier. The village was heavily damaged in early March 1945 during a German counterattack.

Lampaden has 599 inhabitants (as of 2016). These include 279 men (49%) and 288 women (51%).
