= Merzkirchen =

- Municipality
- Coat of arms

- Location of Merzkirchen within Trier-Saarburg district
- Interactive map of Merzkirchen
- Location within Germany Location within Rhineland-Palatinate
- Coordinates: 49°34′45″N 6°28′36″E
- Country: Germany
- State: Rhineland-Palatinate
- District: Trier-Saarburg
- Municipal assoc.: Saarburg-Kell
- Subdivisions: 7 Ortsteile

Government
  - Mayor (2019–24): Peter Hemmerling (CDU)

Area
  - Total: 18.21 km^{2} (7.03 sq mi)
- Elevation: 395 m (1,296 ft)

Population (2025-12-31)
  - Total: 779
  - Density: 42.8/km^{2} (111/sq mi)
- Time zone: UTC+01:00 (CET)
  - Summer (DST): UTC+02:00 (CEST)
- Postal codes: 54439
- Dialling codes: 06581
- Vehicle registration: TR
- Website: www.merzkirchen.de

Merzkirchen is a municipality in the Trier-Saarburg district, in Rhineland-Palatinate, Germany.
