= Palzem =

- Municipality
- Coat of arms

- Location of Palzem within Trier-Saarburg district
- Interactive map of Palzem
- Location within Germany Location within Rhineland-Palatinate
- Coordinates: 49°33′58″N 6°22′19″E
- Country: Germany
- State: Rhineland-Palatinate
- District: Trier-Saarburg
- Municipal assoc.: Saarburg-Kell

Government
  - Mayor (2019–24): Florian Wagner (FW)

Area
  - Total: 21.30 km^{2} (8.22 sq mi)
- Elevation: 165 m (541 ft)

Population (2025-12-31)
  - Total: 1,500
  - Density: 70/km^{2} (180/sq mi)
- Time zone: UTC+01:00 (CET)
  - Summer (DST): UTC+02:00 (CEST)
- Postal codes: 54439
- Dialling codes: 06583
- Vehicle registration: TR
- Website: www.palzem.de

Palzem is a municipality in the Trier-Saarburg district, in Rhineland-Palatinate, Germany.

== History ==
From 18 July 1946 to 6 June 1947 Palzem, in its then municipal boundary, formed part of the Saar Protectorate.
