= Kehl (surname) =

Kehl is a German surname.

Two etymologies have been established. In one etymology, it refers to a habitational surname from various places so named. In another etymology, it constitutes a metaphonic variant or transliteration of the Standard German epithetic surname Kuehl.

== Notable people ==
- Bryan Kehl, American Football player
- Enriko Kehl, German Muay Thai Kickboxer
- Fritz Kehl, Swiss soccer player
- Jason Kehl, American rock climber
- John Kehl, American politician
- Sebastian Kehl, German soccer player
- Sigrid Kehl, German operatic soprano and mezzo-soprano
- Tony Kehl, American college football coach
