= Isabella Foster Rogers Kells =

Isabella Foster Rogers Kells (15 April 1861 – 12 July 1938) was a New Zealand teacher, postmistress and community leader. She was born in East Tāmaki, Auckland, New Zealand, on 15 April 1861.

== Biography ==
Isabella Foster Rogers Kells was the fifth child of parents Eliza Forbes and George Kells.
