= Fisch, Rhineland-Palatinate =

Fisch
- Municipality
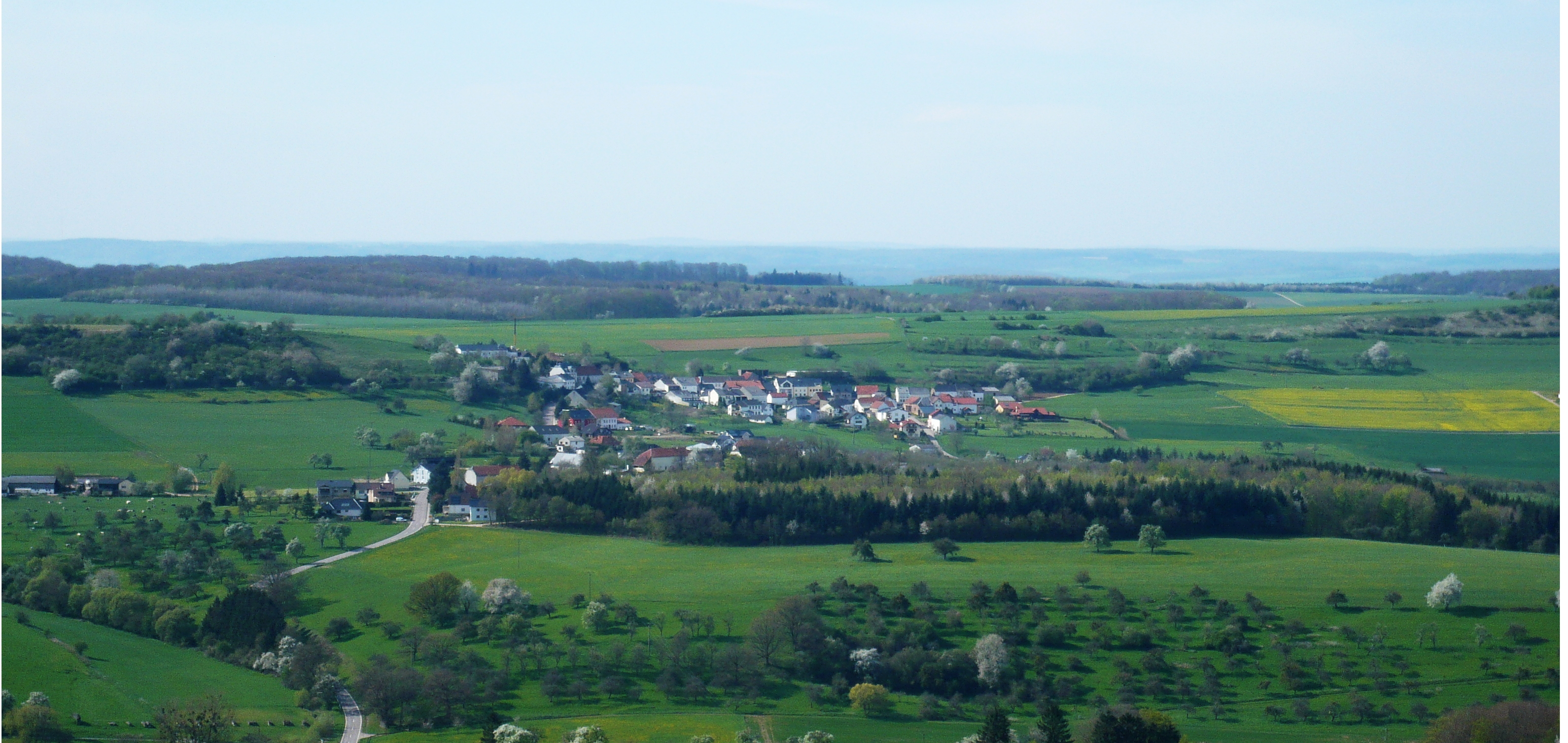

- Coat of arms

- Location of Fisch within Trier-Saarburg district
- Interactive map of Fisch
- Location within Germany Location within Rhineland-Palatinate
- Coordinates: 49°37′06″N 6°29′26″E
- Country: Germany
- State: Rhineland-Palatinate
- District: Trier-Saarburg
- Municipal assoc.: Saarburg-Kell

Government
  - Mayor (2019–24): Otmar Wacht

Area
  - Total: 6.88 km^{2} (2.66 sq mi)
- Elevation: 350 m (1,150 ft)

Population (2025-12-31)
  - Total: 424
  - Density: 61.6/km^{2} (160/sq mi)
- Time zone: UTC+01:00 (CET)
  - Summer (DST): UTC+02:00 (CEST)
- Postal codes: 54439
- Dialling codes: 06581
- Vehicle registration: TR
- Website: fisch-saargau.de

Fisch is a municipality in the Trier-Saarburg district, in Rhineland-Palatinate, Germany. Its population is 414 (Dec. 2020).

== History ==
From 18 July 1946 to 6 June 1947 Fisch, in its then municipal boundary, formed part of the Saar Protectorate.
