= Schillingen =

- Municipality
- Coat of arms

- Location of Schillingen within Trier-Saarburg district
- Interactive map of Schillingen
- Location within Germany Location within Rhineland-Palatinate
- Coordinates: 49°38′3.34″N 6°47′5.98″E
- Country: Germany
- State: Rhineland-Palatinate
- District: Trier-Saarburg
- Municipal assoc.: Saarburg-Kell

Government
  - Mayor (2019–24): Markus Franzen (CDU)

Area
  - Total: 19.58 km^{2} (7.56 sq mi)
- Elevation: 480 m (1,570 ft)

Population (2025-12-31)
  - Total: 1,165
  - Density: 59.50/km^{2} (154.1/sq mi)
- Time zone: UTC+01:00 (CET)
  - Summer (DST): UTC+02:00 (CEST)
- Postal codes: 54429
- Dialling codes: 06589
- Vehicle registration: TR, SAB
- Website: Gemeinde Schillingen

Schillingen (German pronunciation: [ˈʃɪlɪŋən]) is a municipality in the Trier-Saarburg district, in Rhineland-Palatinate, Germany.
