= Baldringen =

- Municipality
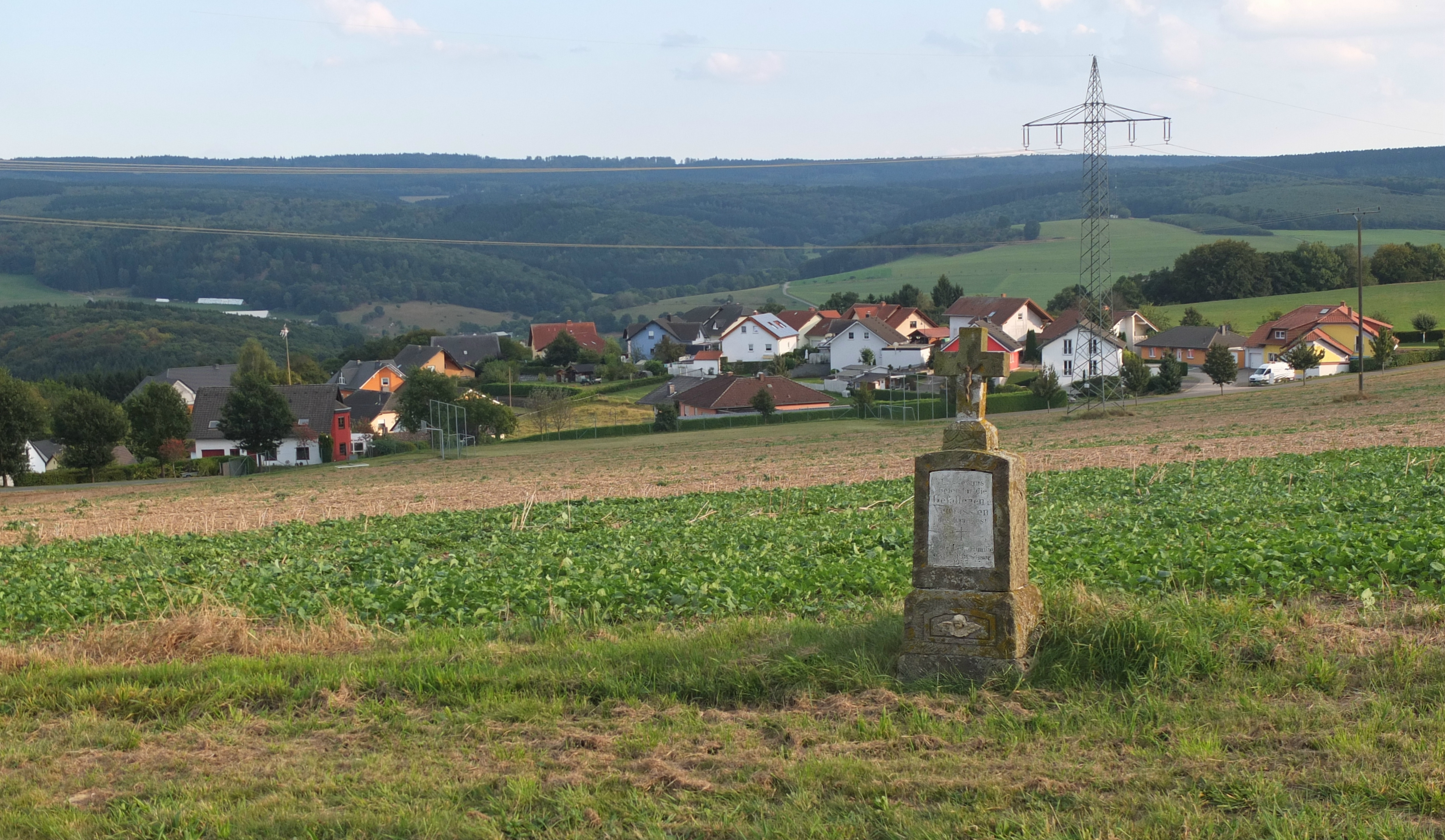
- The village seen from NW

- Coat of arms

- Location of Baldringen within Trier-Saarburg district
- Interactive map of Baldringen
- Location within Germany Location within Rhineland-Palatinate
- Coordinates: 49°36′47.8″N 6°41′3.78″E
- Country: Germany
- State: Rhineland-Palatinate
- District: Trier-Saarburg
- Municipal assoc.: Saarburg-Kell

Government
  - Mayor (2019–24): Jennifer-Laura Höfer

Area
  - Total: 1.76 km^{2} (0.68 sq mi)
- Elevation: 430 m (1,410 ft)

Population (2025-12-31)
  - Total: 255
  - Density: 145/km^{2} (375/sq mi)
- Time zone: UTC+01:00 (CET)
  - Summer (DST): UTC+02:00 (CEST)
- Postal codes: 54314
- Dialling codes: 06587
- Vehicle registration: TR

Baldringen is a municipality in the Trier-Saarburg district, in Rhineland-Palatinate, Germany.

== History ==
From 18 July 1946 to 6 June 1947 Baldringen, in its then municipal boundary, formed part of the Saar Protectorate.
