= Vierherrenborn =

- Municipality
- Coat of arms

- Location of Vierherrenborn within Trier-Saarburg district
- Interactive map of Vierherrenborn
- Location within Germany Location within Rhineland-Palatinate
- Coordinates: 49°36′33″N 6°39′46″E
- Country: Germany
- State: Rhineland-Palatinate
- District: Trier-Saarburg
- Municipal assoc.: Saarburg-Kell

Government
  - Mayor (2019–24): Peter von Wenzlawowicz

Area
  - Total: 8.57 km^{2} (3.31 sq mi)
- Elevation: 470 m (1,540 ft)

Population (2025-12-31)
  - Total: 185
  - Density: 21.6/km^{2} (55.9/sq mi)
- Time zone: UTC+01:00 (CET)
  - Summer (DST): UTC+02:00 (CEST)
- Postal codes: 54314
- Dialling codes: 06587
- Vehicle registration: TR

Vierherrenborn is a municipality in the Trier-Saarburg district, in Rhineland-Palatinate, Germany.
