= Heddert =

- Municipality
- Coat of arms

- Location of Heddert within Trier-Saarburg district
- Interactive map of Heddert
- Location within Germany Location within Rhineland-Palatinate
- Coordinates: 49°38′34″N 6°45′50″E
- Country: Germany
- State: Rhineland-Palatinate
- District: Trier-Saarburg
- Municipal assoc.: Saarburg-Kell

Government
  - Mayor (2019–24): Josef Wagner

Area
  - Total: 4.90 km^{2} (1.89 sq mi)
- Elevation: 500 m (1,600 ft)

Population (2025-12-31)
  - Total: 310
  - Density: 63/km^{2} (160/sq mi)
- Time zone: UTC+01:00 (CET)
  - Summer (DST): UTC+02:00 (CEST)
- Postal codes: 54429
- Dialling codes: 06588, 06589
- Vehicle registration: TR
- Website: Heddert auf der Website der VG Kell am See

Heddert is a municipality in the Trier-Saarburg district, in Rhineland-Palatinate, Germany.
