= Kell (footballer) =

Brazilian footballer

Personal information
- Full name: José Clebson Augustinho
- Date of birth: March 20, 1980 (age 46)
- Place of birth: Natal, Brazil
- Height: 1.81 m (5 ft 11 in)
- Position: Defensive midfielder

Team information
- Current team: Santa Cruz-RN

Senior career*
Years	Team	Apps	(Gls)
2002–2003	Fortaleza	32	(3)
2003	CRB (Loan)	8	(0)
2003	Shenzhen Jianlibao (Loan)	2	(0)
2004	Avaí (Loan)		
2005	Joinville (Loan)		
2006	ABC (Loan)		
2006	Guarani (Loan)		
2006	Atlético-PR		
2006	Ulbra (Loan)		
2007	Atlético-PR		
2008	Santa Cruz-RN		
- * Club domestic league appearances and goals

José Clebson Augustinho, or simply Kell (born March 20, 1980, in Natal), is a Brazilian defensive midfielder. He currently plays for Santa Cruz-RN.

== Honours ==
- Ceará State League: 2003

== Contract ==
- 7 January 2008 to 7 April 2008
