= Wincheringen =

- Municipality
- Flag Coat of arms

- Location of Wincheringen within Trier-Saarburg district
- Interactive map of Wincheringen
- Location within Germany Location within Rhineland-Palatinate
- Coordinates: 49°36′26″N 6°25′26″E
- Country: Germany
- State: Rhineland-Palatinate
- District: Trier-Saarburg
- Municipal assoc.: Saarburg-Kell

Government
  - Mayor (2019–24): Elmar Schömann

Area
  - Total: 18.72 km^{2} (7.23 sq mi)
- Elevation: 240 m (790 ft)

Population (2025-12-31)
  - Total: 2,548
  - Density: 136.1/km^{2} (352.5/sq mi)
- Time zone: UTC+01:00 (CET)
  - Summer (DST): UTC+02:00 (CEST)
- Postal codes: 54457
- Dialling codes: 06583
- Vehicle registration: TR, SAB
- Website: www.wincheringen-mosel.de

Wincheringen is a municipality in the Trier-Saarburg district, in Rhineland-Palatinate, Germany.

== History ==
From 18 July 1946 to 6 June 1947 Wincheringen, in its then municipal boundary, formed part of the Saar Protectorate.
