= Ockfen =

- Municipality
- Coat of arms

- Location of Ockfen within Trier-Saarburg district
- Interactive map of Ockfen
- Location within Germany Location within Rhineland-Palatinate
- Coordinates: 49°37′29″N 6°35′18″E
- Country: Germany
- State: Rhineland-Palatinate
- District: Trier-Saarburg
- Municipal assoc.: Saarburg-Kell

Government
  - Mayor (2019–24): Gerd Benzmüller

Area
  - Total: 2.46 km^{2} (0.95 sq mi)
- Elevation: 170 m (560 ft)

Population (2025-12-31)
  - Total: 574
  - Density: 233/km^{2} (604/sq mi)
- Time zone: UTC+01:00 (CET)
  - Summer (DST): UTC+02:00 (CEST)
- Postal codes: 54441
- Dialling codes: 06581
- Vehicle registration: TR
- Website: www.ockfen-saar.de

Ockfen is a municipality in the Trier-Saarburg district, in Rhineland-Palatinate, Germany.

== History ==
From 18 July 1946 to 6 June 1947 Ockfen, in its then municipal boundary, formed part of the Saar Protectorate.

== Notable people ==
- Gordon Schnieder (born 1975), German politician
