= Schoden =

- Municipality
- Coat of arms

- Location of Schoden within Trier-Saarburg district
- Interactive map of Schoden
- Location within Germany Location within Rhineland-Palatinate
- Coordinates: 49°38′18″N 6°34′39″E
- Country: Germany
- State: Rhineland-Palatinate
- District: Trier-Saarburg
- Municipal assoc.: Saarburg-Kell

Government
  - Mayor (2019–24): Rüdiger Hausen

Area
  - Total: 5.14 km^{2} (1.98 sq mi)
- Elevation: 130 m (430 ft)

Population (2025-12-31)
  - Total: 775
  - Density: 151/km^{2} (391/sq mi)
- Time zone: UTC+01:00 (CET)
  - Summer (DST): UTC+02:00 (CEST)
- Postal codes: 54441
- Dialling codes: 06581
- Vehicle registration: TR
- Website: www.schoden.de

Schoden is a municipality in the Trier-Saarburg district, in Rhineland-Palatinate, Germany.

== History ==
From 18 July 1946 to 6 June 1947 Schoden, in its then municipal boundary, formed part of the Saar Protectorate.
