= Trier-Saarburg =

Coordinates: 49°40′N 6°40′E

- District
- Flag Coat of arms
- Country: Germany
- State: Rhineland-Palatinate
- Founded: June 7, 1969
- Capital: Trier

Government
  - District admin.: Stefan Metzdorf (SPD)

Area
  - Total: 1,102.26 km^{2} (425.58 sq mi)

Population (31 December 2024)
  - Total: 153,814
  - Density: 139.544/km^{2} (361.418/sq mi)
- Time zone: UTC+01:00 (CET)
  - Summer (DST): UTC+02:00 (CEST)
- Vehicle registration: TR, SAB
- Website: trier-saarburg.de

Trier-Saarburg (German pronunciation: [ˌtʁiːɐ̯ˈzaːɐ̯bʊʁk]; Luxembourgish: Landkrees Tréier-Saarburg [ˈlɑntkʀeːs ˌtʀɜɪ̯ɐˈzaːʁbuχɕ]) is a district in the west of Rhineland-Palatinate, Germany. Neighboring districts are (from the north and clockwise) Bitburg-Prüm, Bernkastel-Wittlich, Birkenfeld, Sankt Wendel (Saarland), and Merzig-Wadern (Saarland). To the west it borders Luxembourg. The district-free city Trier is surrounded by the district.

== History ==
The district was created in 1969 by merging the previous districts Trier and Saarburg.

== Geography ==
The main river in the district is the Moselle. The area between its tributaries, the Ruwer and the Saar, is also well known as one of the prime wine regions of Germany.

== Museums ==
- Roscheider Hof Open Air Museum, Konz
- Fell Exhibition Slate Mine
- Air museum, Hermeskeil
- Railway and steam engine museum, Hermeskeil

== Coat of arms ==
The coat of arms largely resembles the coat of arms of the Saarburg district. The castle in the middle shows the castle of Saarburg, even though now only the ruins of the castle remains. The red cross is the cross of Trier, as a large part of the Saarburg district (as well as of the new Trier-Saarburg district) historically belonged to the state of Trier. The blue bars were added after the merging with the Trier district, and symbolize that part of that district historically belonged to Luxembourg.

== Verbandsgemeinden ==
The district is divided into six Verbandsgemeinden. The list contains the coats of arms, the names, the district areas, exemplarily the population figures from 1950 as well as the current population figures:

Name	Area (km^{2})	Population (1950)	Population (December 31, 2019)
Hermeskeil	145.58	11 409	15 302
Konz	130.41	19 599	32 313
Ruwer	126.55	10 780	18 467
Saarburg-Kell	359.84	25 595	33 025
Schweich an der Römischen Weinstraße	164.45	20 265	28 344
Trier-Land	175.42	14 134	21 947
Trier-Saarburg district	1 102.26	101 782	149 398

== Towns and municipalities ==
Clickable map of towns and municipalities in the district

Four towns and 100 municipalities make up the district in southwestern Germany. The list contains the coats of arms, the names, the district areas, exemplarily the population figures from 1950 as well as the current population figures:

Name	Verbandsgemeinde	Area (km^{2})	Population (1950)	Population (December 31, 2019)
Aach	VG Trier-Land	6.95	479	1 086
Ayl	VG Saarburg-Kell	7.58	931	1 544
Baldringen	VG Saarburg-Kell	1.76	162	270
Bekond	VG Schweich	3.81	591	953
Bescheid	VG Hermeskeil	7.62	373	399
Beuren	VG Hermeskeil	18.50	897	925
Bonerath	VG Ruwer	4.25	221	233
Damflos	VG Hermeskeil	5.31	515	62
Detzem	VG Schweich	5.56	658	607
Ensch	VG Schweich	6.83	532	456
Farschweiler	VG Ruwer	7.45	531	828
Fell	VG Schweich	15.73	1 843	2 421
Fisch	VG Saarburg-Kell	6.88	302	406
Föhren	VG Schweich	9.79	1 903	2 906
Franzenheim	VG Trier-Land	6.47	322	369
Freudenburg	VG Saarburg-Kell	11.00	1 396	1 832
Geisfeld	VG Hermeskeil	8.87	471	483
Greimerath	VG Saarburg-Kell	12.12	873	944
Grimburg	VG Hermeskeil	10.18	423	460
Gusenburg	VG Hermeskeil	7.36	770	1 108
Gusterath	VG Ruwer	4.41	339	2 025
Gutweiler	VG Ruwer	2.51	291	657
Heddert	VG Saarburg-Kell	4.90	204	265
Hentern	VG Saarburg-Kell	6.15	344	380
Herl	VG Ruwer	2.83	199	261
Hermeskeil (Town)	VG Hermeskeil	30.85	3 711	6 638
Hinzenburg	VG Ruwer	2.87	163	136
Hinzert-Pölert	VG Hermeskeil	4.85	407	301
Hockweiler	VG Trier-Land	2.08	143	279
Holzerath	VG Ruwer	6.79	326	436
Igel	VG Trier-Land	7.30	1 006	2 089
Irsch	VG Saarburg-Kell	15.21	1 249	1 520
Kanzem	VG Konz	4.29	481	641
Kasel	VG Ruwer	4.53	1 029	1 333
Kastel-Staadt	VG Saarburg-Kell	5.23	455	433
Kell am See	VG Saarburg-Kell	28.26	1 385	1 938
Kenn	VG Schweich	3.88	960	2 745
Kirf	VG Saarburg-Kell	19.15	954	804
Klüsserath	VG Schweich	11.70	1 239	1 058
Konz (Town)	VG Konz	44.54	10 047	18 332
Kordel	VG Trier-Land	16.60	1 824	2 143
Korlingen	VG Ruwer	2.08	194	822
Köwerich	VG Schweich	2.31	375	375
Lampaden	VG Saarburg-Kell	8.16	503	554
Langsur	VG Trier-Land	11.93	1 467	1 735
Leiwen	VG Schweich	12.71	1 360	1 547
Longen	VG Schweich	0.97	135	114
Longuich	VG Schweich	8.82	1 069	1 309
Lorscheid	VG Ruwer	5.09	444	542
Mandern	VG Saarburg-Kell	23.96	816	861
Mannebach	VG Saarburg-Kell	6.02	349	328
Mehring	VG Schweich	22.37	1 774	2 418
Mertesdorf	VG Ruwer	6.47	990	1 670
Merzkirchen	VG Saarburg-Kell	18.21	916	827
Morscheid	VG Ruwer	5.48	526	935
Naurath (Eifel)	VG Schweich	5.18	367	353
Naurath (Wald)	VG Hermeskeil	5.58	218	218
Neuhütten	VG Hermeskeil	10.50	840	732
Newel	VG Trier-Land	16.65	1 099	2 725
Nittel	VG Konz	16.98	1 476	2 565
Oberbillig	VG Konz	5.36	701	967
Ockfen	VG Saarburg-Kell	2.46	495	599
Ollmuth	VG Ruwer	3.92	174	156
Onsdorf	VG Konz	3.42	214	2 565
Osburg	VG Ruwer	32.92	1 227	2 412
Palzem	VG Saarburg-Kell	21.30	1 378	1 492
Paschel	VG Saarburg-Kell	4.30	195	232
Pellingen	VG Konz	7.21	515	1 177
Pluwig	VG Ruwer	4.87	657	1 681
Pölich	VG Schweich	3.20	331	481
Ralingen	VG Trier-Land	27.64	1 762	2 103
Rascheid	VG Hermeskeil	8.05	494	461
Reinsfeld	VG Hermeskeil	19.77	1 615	2 362
Riol	VG Schweich	6.31	688	1 266
Riveris	VG Ruwer	2.11	286	411
Saarburg (Town)	VG Saarburg-Kell	20.36	4 942	7 381
Schillingen	VG Saarburg-Kell	19.58	902	1 182
Schleich	VG Schweich	1.59	225	239
Schoden	VG Saarburg-Kell	5.14	393	686
Schömerich	VG Saarburg-Kell	2.46	163	122
Schöndorf	VG Ruwer	10.03	716	789
Schweich (Town)	VG Schweich	31.09	4 597	7 848
Serrig	VG Saarburg-Kell	17.63	1 431	1 662
Sommerau	VG Ruwer	1.04	111	68
Taben-Rodt	VG Saarburg-Kell	16.16	752	786
Tawern	VG Konz	10.08	1 584	2 565
Temmels	VG Konz	6.62	579	800
Thomm	VG Ruwer	4.49	707	1 066
Thörnich	VG Schweich	2.49	229	199
Trassem	VG Saarburg-Kell	7.53	650	1 160
Trierweiler	VG Trier-Land	18.42	1 257	3 747
Trittenheim	VG Schweich	10.10	1 389	1 049
Vierherrenborn	VG Saarburg-Kell	8.57	-	193
Waldrach	VG Ruwer	12.46	1 649	2 024
Waldweiler	VG Saarburg-Kell	11.08	629	826
Wasserliesch	VG Konz	7.59	1 521	2 215
Wawern	VG Konz	5.27	458	607
Wellen	VG Konz	3.09	683	810
Welschbillig	VG Trier-Land	37.08	2 404	2 610
Wiltingen	VG Konz	16.01	1 340	1 402
Wincheringen	VG Saarburg-Kell	18.72	1 543	2 276
Zemmer	VG Trier-Land	24.38	2 371	3 061
Zerf	VG Saarburg-Kell	28.87	1 156	1 522
Züsch	VG Hermeskeil	8.04	317	595
Trier-Saarburg district		1 102.26	101 782	149 398

== Transport links ==
Logo of the public transport association Verkehrsverbund Region Trier

The Moselstrecke, Eifel Railway, Trierer Weststrecke, Saar Railway, Obermoselstrecke, and the Trier-Luxemburg Railway are partly located in the Trier-Saarburg district, also the Ruwer Hochwaldbahn from Trier to Hermeskeil, but it is out of service.

The Trier-Saarburg district is located in the area of the transport association Verkehrsverbund Region Trier (VRT).
