= Moselle Wine Queen =

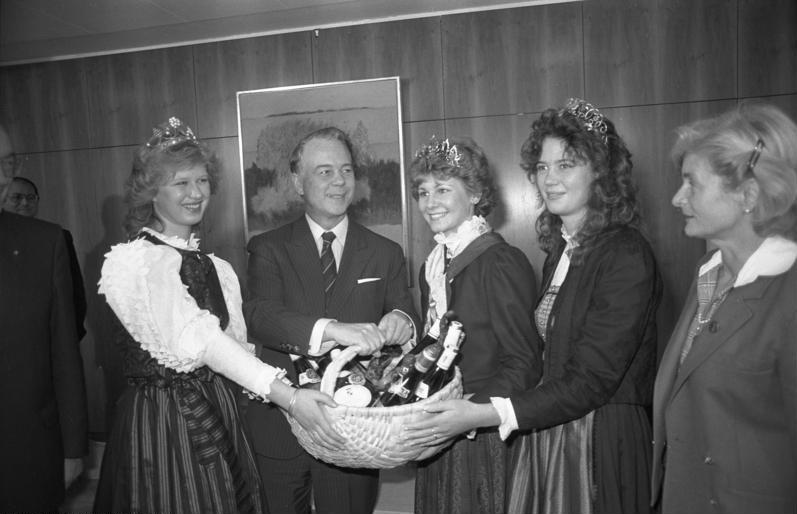
Presentation to Bundesrat president, Ernst Albrecht, by the German Wine Queen, Mechthild Meyer from Waldrach (centre) and her two wine princesses, Monika Kram (l) from Franconia and Barbara Laurenstein (r) from the Nahe. 1985

The Moselle Wine Queen (German: Mosel-Weinkönigin), until 2006 the Moselle-Saar-Ruwer Wine Queen (Mosel-Saar-Ruwer-Weinkönigin), is a young woman who is elected for a period of a year to represent the Moselle wine region. The first one was chosen in 1949. In the year following her 'reign', the Moselle Wine Queen is eligible to run for the position of German Wine Queen.

== List of Moselle wine queens ==
The wine queens of Moselle-Saar-Ruwer:

- 1949/1950: Marie-Elisabeth Steffen née Pütz, Saarburg, German Wine Queen in 1950/1951
- 1950/1951: Waltraud Jarrold née Krall, Winningen
- 1951/1952: Bernarda Rath née von Nell, Trier
- 1952/1953: Gertrud Weimer née Görgen, Zell
- 1953/1954: Juliane König née Kohl, Dhron
- 1954/1955: Appollonia Clüsserath née Schmitz, Trittenheim
- 1955/1956: Ursel Sünner née Schwarzbeck, Winningen
- 1956/1957: Helga Steuer née Fuchs, Pommern (Mosel)
- (not regional wine queen) Margret Wilmes née Hoffranzen, Mehring, German Wine Queen in 1956/1957
- 1957/1958: Helga Alsbach née Simonis, Kobern-Gondorf
- 1958/1959: Gertrude Riepe, Traben-Trarbach
- 1959/1961: Doris Knebel née Löwenstein, Winningen
- 1961/1963: Irmine Hoffmann née Regnery, Klüsserath
- 1963/1964: Inge Heidenreich née Schwaab, Zeltingen, German Wine Queen in 1963/1964
- 1964/1965: Siegrun Weber-Herges, Kröv
- 1965/1966: Hildegard Kochendörfer née Bidinger, Saarburg
- 1966/1967: Birgit Höreth née Schaaf, Winningen
- 1966/1967: Ruth Kutz née Collet, Reil, German Wine Queen in 1967/1968
- 1967/1968: Hildegard Ziegenhagen née Ketter, Kröv
- 1968/1969: Elisabeth Weis née Steffes, Leiwen
- 1969/1970: Monika McKinstry née Servaty, Mesenich
- 1970/1971: Reinhilde Lima née Rothbrust, Kasel
- 1971/1972: Marlene Weber née Mai, Mehring
- 1972/1973: Hildrud Specht née Zenzen, Ellenz-Poltersdorf
- 1973/1974: Anneliese Zilliken née Hellers, Nittel
- 1974/1975: Cornelia Kröber née Löwenstein, Winningen
- 1975/1976: Jutta Montag née Kieren, Graach
- 1975/1976: Rita Hermes, Ellenz-Poltersdorf
- 1976/1977: Juliane Weiler née Loskill, Mehring
- 1977/1978: Angela Schmidt née Hahn, Koblenz-Güls
- 1978/1979: Rita Moog-Fischer, Valwig, German Wine Queen in 1979/1980
- 1979/1980: Giesela Kiefer, Wiltingen
- 1980/1981: Susanne Mölich née Körber, Winningen
- 1981/1982: Ingrid Scholtes née Welter, Klüsserath
- 1982/1983: Angelika Clüsserath, Trittenheim
- 1983/1984: Christine Lucas née Weis, Leiwen
- 1984/1985: Mechthild Weis née Meyer, Waldrach, German Wine Queen in 1985/1986
- 1985/1986: Jutta Schneider née Simon, Ayl
- 1986/1987: Jutta Fassian-Emmrich, Mehring, previously wine queen of Mehring, German Wine Queen in 1987/1988
- 1987/1988: Sigrid Braun, Ernst
- 1988/1989: Stephanie Balthasar née Michels, Klotten
- 1989/1990: Annette Kröger, Neef
- 1990/1991: Lydia Bollig-Strohm, Trittenheim, German Wine Queen in 1991/1992
- 1991/1992: Bettina Fischer, Briedel
- 1992/1993: Rita Marmann née Schneider, Schweich
- 1993/1994: Judith Bell née Schwarz, Müden
- 1994/1995: Sabine Zenz, Ediger-Eller
- 1995/1996: Gaby Hoffmann, Osann-Monzel
- 1996/1997: Sandra Berweiler, Leiwen
- 1997/1998: Tina Hergenröder, Oberfell
- 1998/1999: Marion Erbes, Wolf (Traben-Trarbach)
- 1999/2000: Carina Dostert, Nittel, German Wine Queen in 2000/2001
- 2000/2001: Anne Oberbillig, Trier
- 2001/2002: Janine Rosinski, St. Aldegund
- 2002/2003: Kristina Simon, Schweich
- 2003/2004: Petra Zimmermann, Temmels, German Wine Queen in 2004/2005
- 2004/2005: Nicole Kochan, Lieser
- 2005/2006: Anne Mertes, Konz-Oberemmel
- 2006/2007: Katja Fehres, Brauneberg, previously wine queen of Brauneberg
- 2007/2008: Martina Servaty, Mesenich
- 2008/2009: Sonja Christ, Oberfell, German Wine Queen in 2009/2010
- 2009/2010: Katharina Okfen, Maring-Noviand
- 2010/2011: Ramona Sturm, Moselkern
- 2011/2012: Andrea Schlechter, Enkirch
- 2012/2013: Maria Steffes, Ayl
- 2013/2014: Kathrin Schnitzius, Kröv (66th German Wine Princess in 2014/2015)
- 2014/2015: Lisa Dieterichs, Ellenz-Poltersdorf
- 2015/2016: Lena Endesfelder, Mehring
- 2016/2017: Lisa Schmitt, Leiwen

== Saar-Upper Moselle wine queens and princesses ==
Since the wine region of Moselle-Saar-Ruwer was renamed in 2006 to the Moselle (Mosel) Wine Region and the title of the wine queen was changed to conform with that, there has been an additional election for the wine queen of the Saar-Upper Moselle Region (Saar-Obermosel-Region).

- 2005/2006 Sabrina Schons, Ayl

Princess(es): Angela Thurn (Konz-Roscheid) and Claudia Maximini

- 2006/2007 Angela Thurn, Konz-Roscheid

Princess(es): N. N.

- 2007/2008 Jessica Willems, Nittel

Princess(es): Christina Rommelfanger and Tamara Beck (Nittel)

- 2008/2009 Judith Schmitt, Oberemmel

Princess(es): Anne Simon (Ockfen), Michaela Zimmer and Kerstin Michels (Ockfen)

- 2009/2010 Anne Simon, Ockfen

Princess(es): Kerstin Michels (Ockfen) and Natalie Scheer (Kastel-Staadt)

- 2010/2011 Anne Thein, Wasserliesch

Princess(es): Natalie Scheer (Kastel-Staadt) and Melanie Scheuer (Nittel-Rehlingen)

- 2011/2012 Maria Steffes, Ayl

Princess(es): Elisabeth Ley (Tawern-Fellerich)

- 2012/2013 Elisabeth Ley, Tawern-Fellerich

Princess(es): Frederike Welter (Wincheringen)

- 2013/2014 Frederike Welter (Wincheringen)

Princess(es): Sitta Piedmont (Konz-Filzen) and Barbara Steffes (Ayl)

- 2014/2015 Sophie Meyer (Saarburg-Beurig)

Princess(es): Sarah Schmitt (Konz-Filzen)

- 2015/2016 Sarah Schmitt (Konz-Filzen)

Princess(es): Anna Karges (Schoden) and Kerstin Reinert (Serrig)
