= German Wine Queen =

Representative of the German wine industry

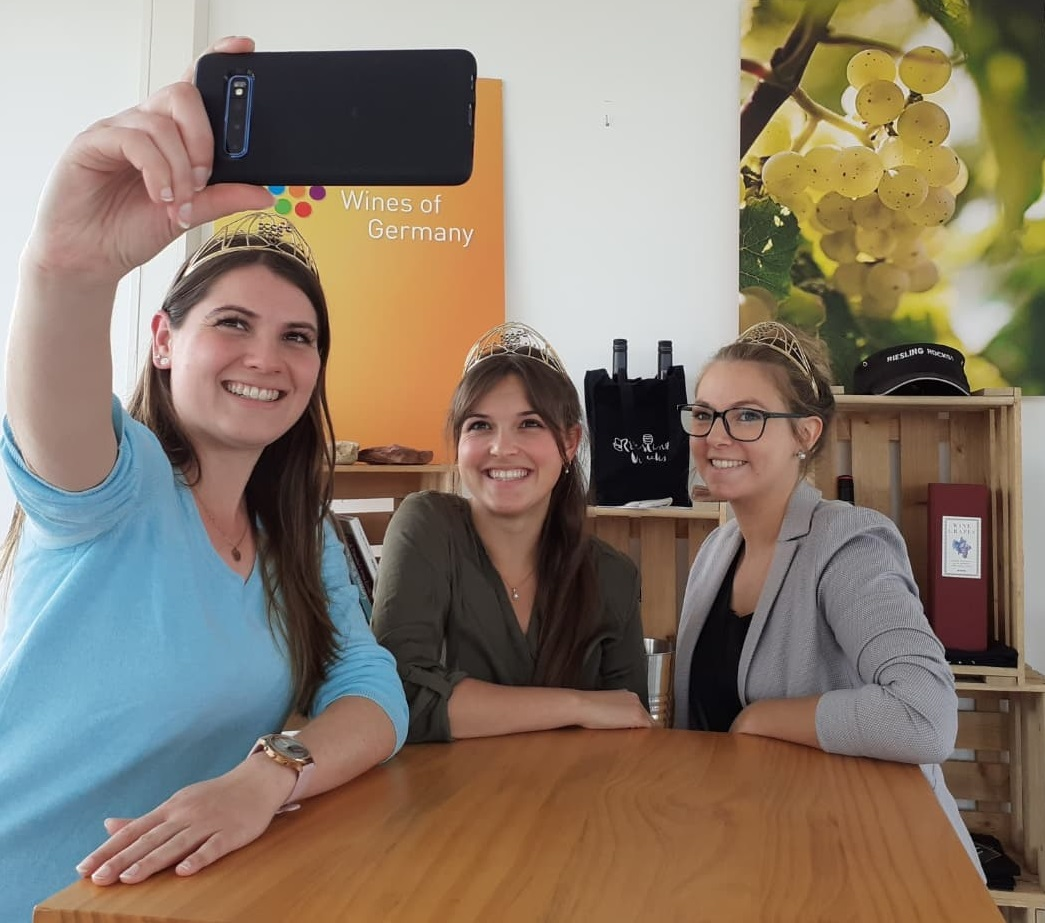
GermanWineAmbassadors Sina Erdrich, Linda Trarbach and Saskia Teucke. The new trio for 2021/2022 visiting Deutsches Weininstitut, taking over control of the respective social media channels

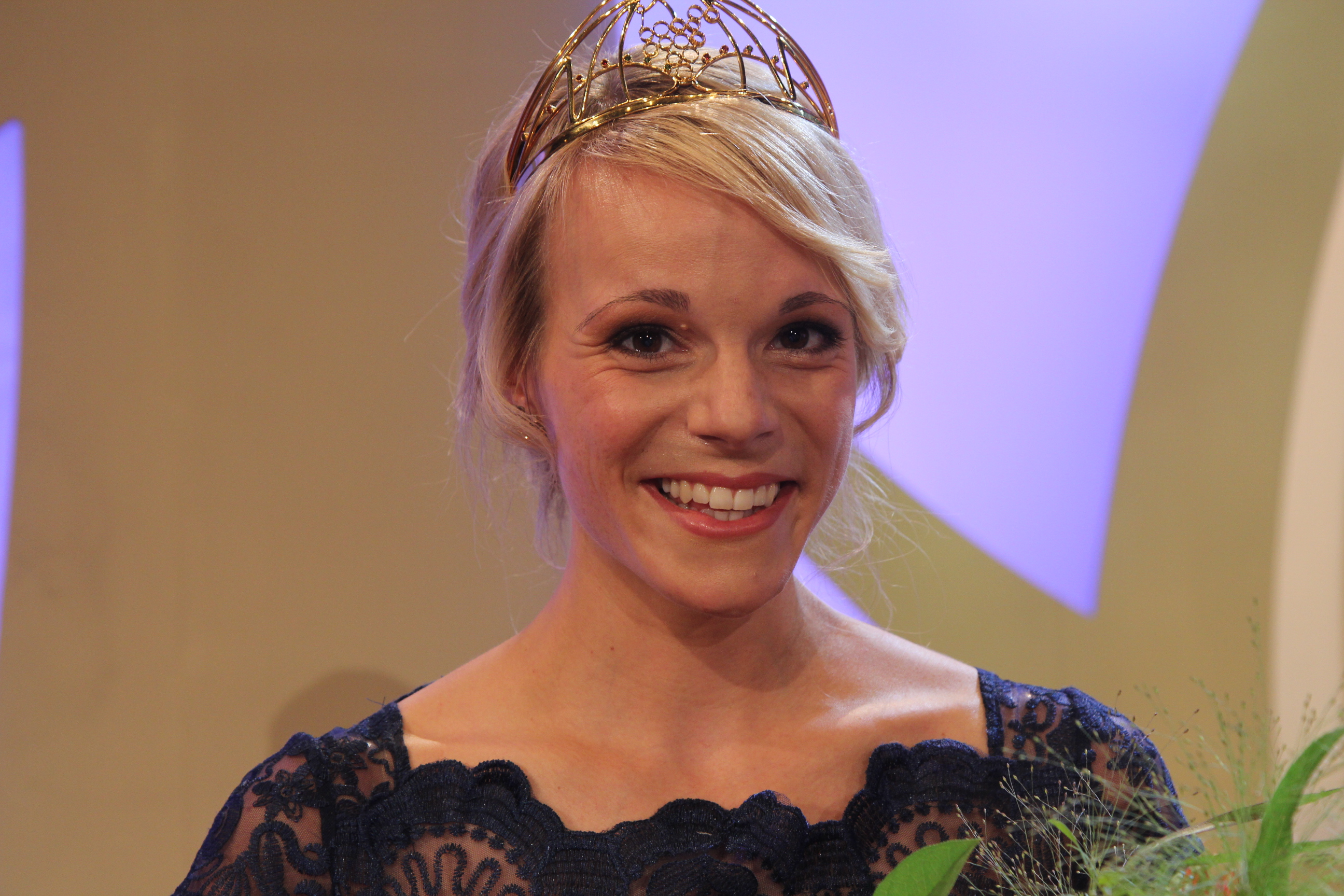
Katharina Staab, German Wine Queen 2017/18

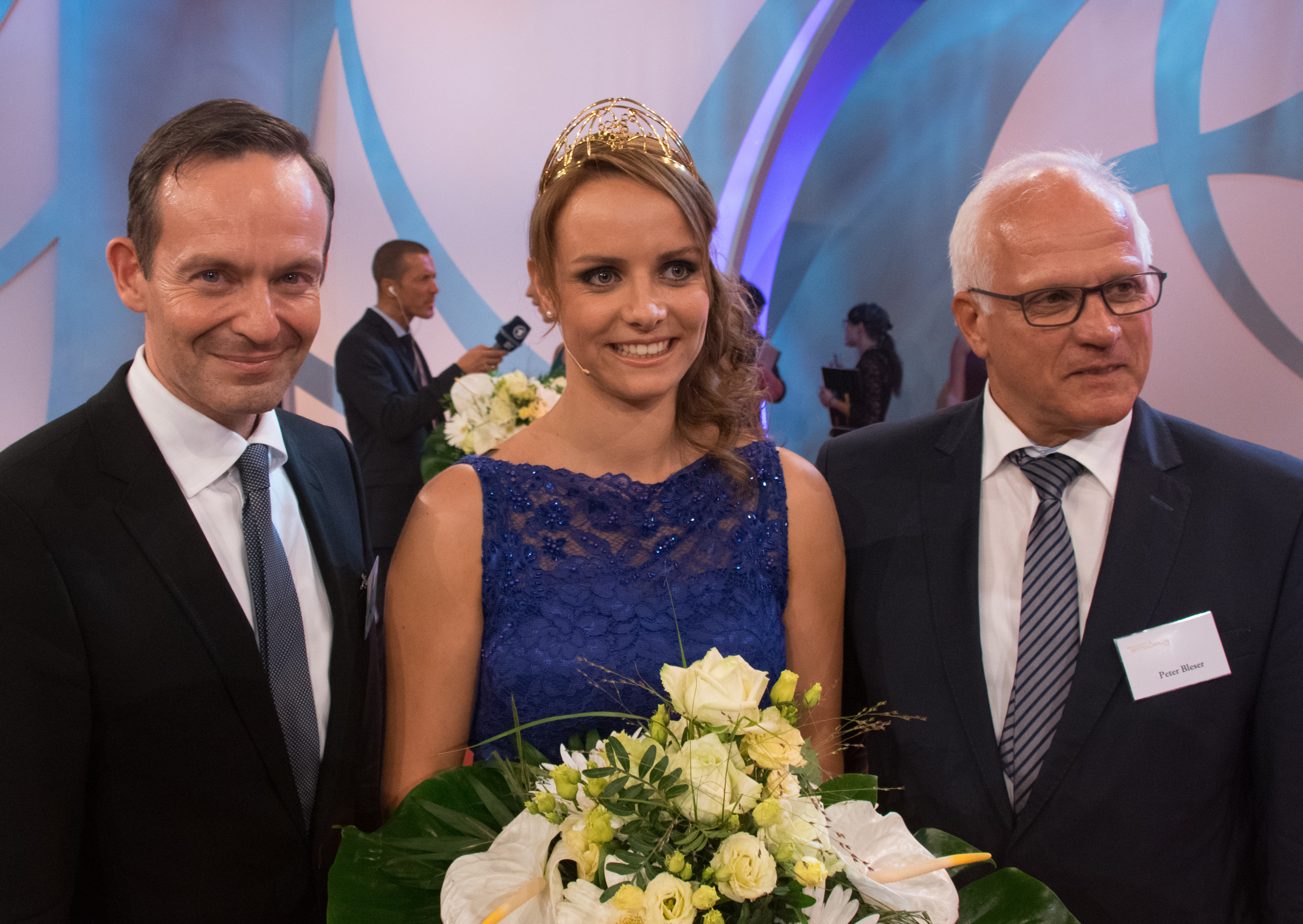
Lena Endesfelder, German Wine Queen 2016/17

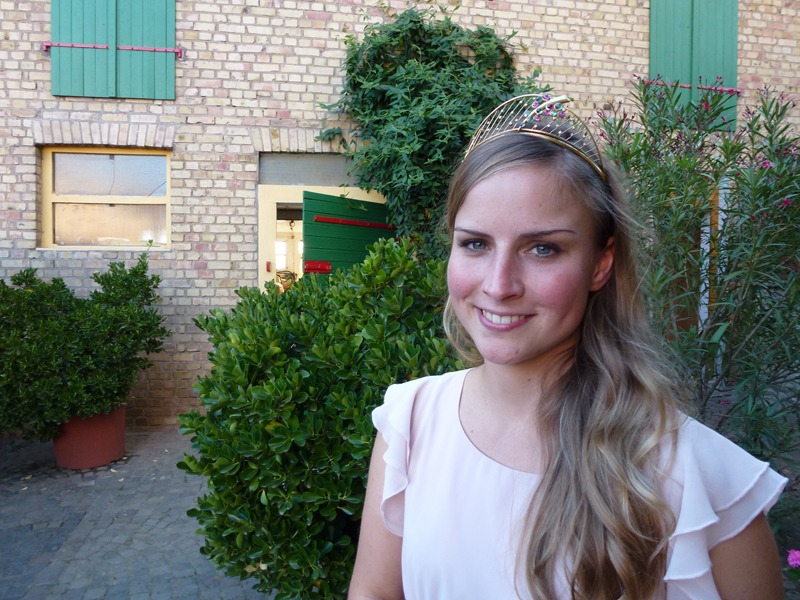
German Wine Queen 2011/2012: Annika Strebel (Rheinhessen wine region)

The German Wine Queen (German: Deutsche Weinkönigin) is the representative of the German wine industry. The Wine Queen is supported by two princesses, forming together the German Wine Ambassadors. She is elected, usually in the Palatine town of Neustadt an der Weinstraße, for a period of one year. The title is competed for by the regional wine queens of the thirteen German wine regions producing "quality" wine.

The 75th German Wine Queen is Eva Brockmann from Haibach, Lower Franconia; she was chosen on 29 September 2023 for the period 2023/2024.

== History ==
=== Beginnings ===
In 1931 the first German wine region, the Palatinate, crowned its own wine queen. The idea for this "Palatine Wine Queen" came from publisher, Daniel Meininger. At his suggestion, Ruth Bachrodt (later Theysohn) was elected. She came from Pirmasens in Western Palatinate where, in fact, no wine is produced. Her successor, Cecily Seitz, was elected in 1932 by popular request. In 1933, control of the festival was taken over by Nazi leaders. Until the beginning of the Second World War, the official Gau Photographer sought out the "prettiest young woman associated with the wine industry" on behalf of the very popular Gauleiter of the Palatinate, Joseph Buerckel.

Because the Palatine Wine Queen was Germany's only wine queen, she automatically represented the German wine industry in general as well as the Palatine wine region until 1939, and then again, from 1947 until 1949. In 1949, there was still only one competition but, following the election, Elisabeth Kuhn, later Gies from Diedesfeld, was officially nominated as the German Wine Queen, so that she officially became both the Palatine and German Wine Queen in the same year.

=== Criteria for candidates ===
Since 1950, the German Wine Queen has been elected in a separate competition. Each year, every recognized German wine region selects its local wine queen. From these regional wine queens, the German Wine Queen is chosen the following year. Until 1999, it was a condition that the candidates had to be single – they could be neither married nor divorced – and had to come from a family of winemakers. Since 2000, the candidates who apply have only had to have "clear and strong ties with German wines," demonstrated by "appropriate wine-related training and / or a family relationship with the local wine production and / or the qualification as an area wine queen". In addition, applicants must be at least 18 years old on the day of election.

=== Changing requirements ===
For about 30 years the wine queens represented the traditional image of the pretty and virtuous maiden in traditional costume, the only significant change being in 1966 when the original sceptre was replaced by a wine glass. As the newspaper, Süddeutsche Zeitung, said in 1950, the candidates were "true daughters of the vineyards, they were of powerful build, healthy and wholesome". Their assessment, at that time, included performing a waltz and giving a speech. Until the late 1950s, the ceremonial duties of the German Wine Queen were mainly restricted to domestic markets. There were appearances at wine festivals during Green Week and at social events such as the awarding of the German Wine Culture Prize. Trips abroad, such as to Belgium (Irmgard Mohler) or to Spain (Wilma Seyer, later Scholl) remained the exception. However, the then Foreign Minister, Heinrich von Brentano, recognized the diplomatic potential for the image of the young federal republic, when he presented Wilma Seyer at the "Diplomats' Wine Festival" in Eberbach Monastery that he had initiated. By the following year, the Palatine, later German, Wine Queen, Christel Koch, traveled to the US, the first time a wine queen from Germany had done so.

In the 1980s the image of the Wine Queen in public began to fundamentally change, especially with the election of personalities such as Karin Molitor (1982/83) and Petra Mayer (1988/89). In 1981 the wearing of the dirndl, the traditional dress that had been obligatory for photo calls, was scrapped. From the 1990s, it changed from being a role for young women vintners or those who were linked to the wine trade, to being a career springboard into politics (Julia Klöckner), into marketing (Katja Schweder, Evelyn Schmidt), into gastronomy (Carina Dostert) or starting small businesses (Sandra Hake, Sylvia Benzinger). Selection is no longer based so much on good looks and dancing skills today; more important, in addition to a knowledge of oenology and winemaking technology, quick wit and eloquence are required as well as proficiency in foreign languages and a knowledge of the export business. As a result, a preparatory seminar for the candidates was introduced in Neustadt an der Weinstraße in 2009.

== Selection ==
=== Venue ===
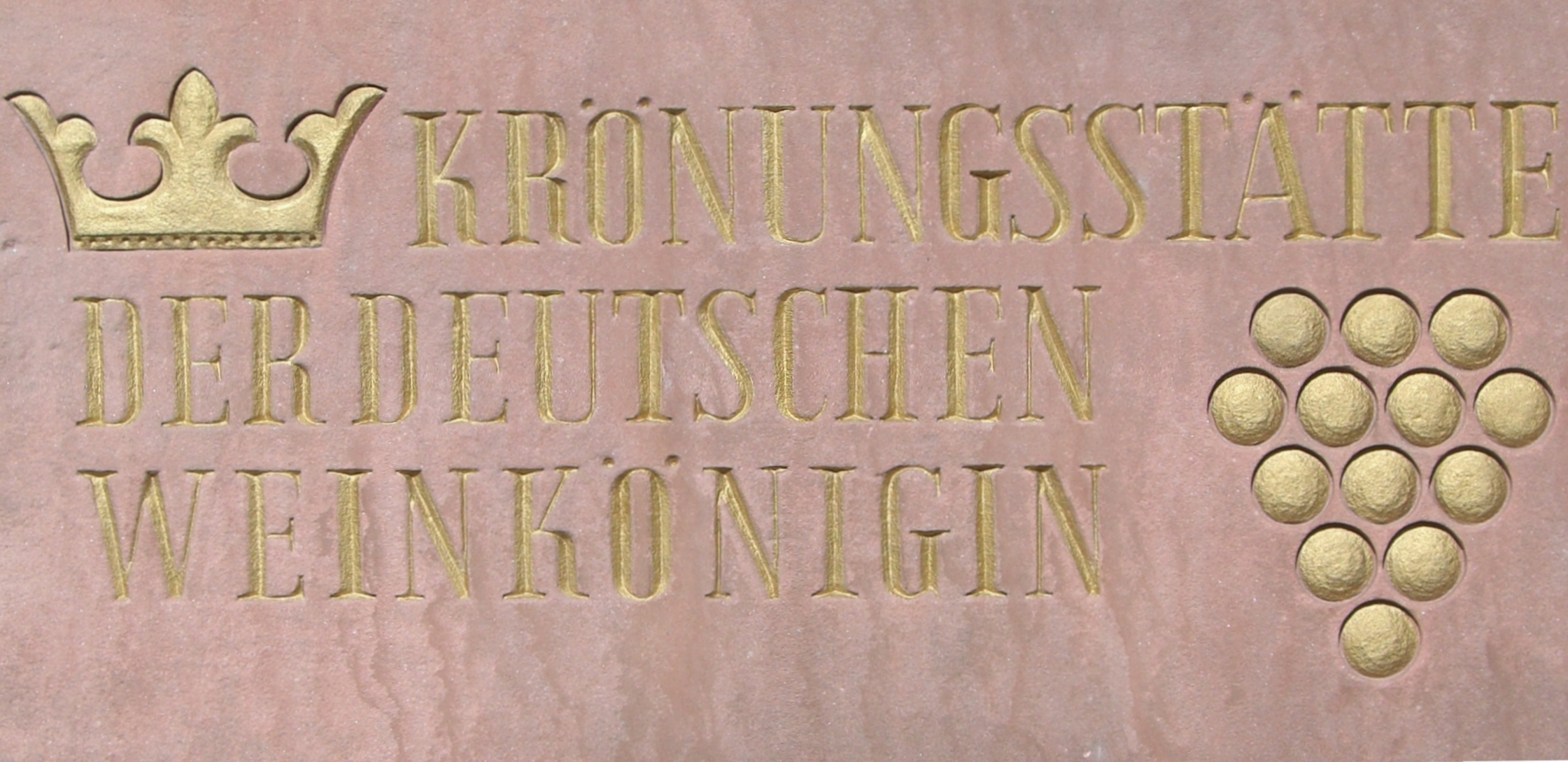
Inscription on Neustadt festival hall (Saalbau): Coronation site of the German Wine Queen

The German Wine Queen competition is arranged by the German Wine Institute (DWI) whose head office is in Bodenheim. It is traditionally held in the Saalbau festival hall in Neustadt on the occasion of the German Wine Harvest Festival on the Friday of the second festival week in October. However, the venue can be changed on important occasions. In addition to Neustadt an der Weinstraße, other venues have been:

1. 1952 Freiburg im Breisgau
2. 1954 Heilbronn
3. 1957 Würzburg
4. 1960 Bad Dürkheim
5. 1963, 2016 Mainz
6. 1966 Stuttgart
7. 1969 Offenburg
8. 1972 Stuttgart
9. 1975 Stuttgart
10. 1984 Trier
11. 1988 Berlin
12. 1993 Bad Neuenahr-Ahrweiler
13. 1998 Freyburg (Unstrut)
14. 2006 Dresden (800th anniversary of the city, the most important place in the Saxon wine region)
15. 2009 Heilbronn
  1. In May 2009, the DWI and the Mayor of Neustadt an der Weinstraße signed a contract that stipulates Neustadt as the coronation venue until 2020. This rule may be waived no more than three times per decade, "to give other German wine regions the opportunity to host the coronation in order to respond to special events and celebrations."
16. 2013 Offenburg, Oberrheinhalle; preliminary round on 7 September; final round for the six remaining regional queens on 13 September.

=== Election process ===
In recent times the election process has changed several times. In 2009, for the first time, the competition was broadcast on a large screen outside the venue. In the first round, 12 of the 13 regional wine queens faced a rigorous oral examination with questions about viticultural and winemaking techniques, as well as wine labelling, packaging and marketing, from a panel of 80 judges. In addition each candidate had to assist – in English – a "confused foreign tourist" visiting Germany's wine country. Only six candidates went through to the second and final round, a televised "gala" attended by 1,300 guests and watched by more than a million viewers, where the 18- to 25-year-olds had to demonstrate they could field questions on wine-making spontaneously. After the competition, the newly elected wine queen and her two princesses were invited by the Minister for Agriculture and the town of Heilbronn to a festival banquet, the so-called "After-Show Party".

During their one-year term of office, the Wine Queen and Wine Princesses advertise German wine at trade fairs, wine festivals and other events. The Wine Queen, in particular, is the ambassador of German wine-growers and their products at some 250 appearances in Germany and abroad.

=== Results ===
==== German wine queens since 1949 ====
The following table lists all German wine queens since 1949:

#	Year	Wine Queen	Born/died	Age when elected	Wine region	Town of origin
1.	1949/1950	Elisabeth Kuhn, later Gies	1930–2012	19	Palatinate	Diedesfeld
2.	1950/1951	Marie-Elisabeth Pütz, later Steffen	1925	25	Moselle-Saar-Ruwer (since 2006 Moselle)	Saarburg
3.	1951/1952	Gisela Koch			Mittelrhein	St. Goarshausen
4.	1952/1953	Elisabeth Huber			Baden	Neuweier
5.	1953/1954	Mathilde Machwirth			Nahe	Guldental
6.	1954/1955	Erika Hofmann			Rheinhessen	St. Johann
7.	1955/1956	Irmgard Mohler	1937–1981	18	Palatinate	Bad Bergzabern
8.	1956/1957	Margret Hoffranzen, later Wilmes	?–2002		Moselle-Saar-Ruwer	Mehring (Moselle)
9.	1957/1958	Karoline Hartmann		18	Franconia	Rödelsee
10.	1958/1959	Rosemarie Schreck		24	Franconia	Klingenberg
11.	1959/1960	Wilma Seyer, later Scholl	1939	20	Rheingau	Kiedrich
12.	1960/1961	Christel Koch		18	Palatinate	Ungstein
13.	1961/1962	Marlies Kaiser		22	Rheinhessen	Dintesheim
14.	1962/1963	Marita Heinzen, later Schmitz		19	Ahr	Ahrweiler
15.	1963/1964	Inge Schwaab, later Heidenreich			Moselle-Saar-Ruwer	Zeltingen
16.	1964/1965	Marita Bäuerlein		20	Franconia	Volkach
17.	1965/1966	Waltraud Hey		19	Palatinate	Oberotterbach
18.	1966/1967	Ilse Theobald		22	Nahe	Hochstätten
19.	1967/1968	Ruth Collet, later Kutz			Moselle-Saar-Ruwer	Reil
20.	1968/1969	Brigitte Wolf		21	Franconia	Veitshöchheim
21.	1969/1970	Marika Gebhardt		19	Rheingau	Martinsthal
22.	1970/1971	Erika Sinß		18	Nahe	Windesheim
23.	1971/1972	Ruth Kröther		20	Palatinate	Freinsheim
24.	1972/1973	Ulrike Seyffardt, later Neradt	1951		Rheingau	Martinsthal
25.	1973/1974	Ingrid Kurth		21	Ahr	Bad Neuenahr-Ahrweiler
26.	1974/1975	Doris Emmerich	1954	20	Nahe	Waldböckelheim
27.	1975/1976	Edelgard Bauer	1955	20	Nahe	Kirschroth
28.	1976/1977	Friedlinde Gurr, later Gurr-Hirsch	1954	22	Württemberg	Untergruppenbach
29.	1977/1978	Gisela Faber			Baden	Freiburg im Breisgau
30.	1978/1979	Heike Schmitt		19	Rheinhessen	Nierstein
31.	1979/1980	Rita Moog, later Moog-Fischer			Moselle-Saar-Ruwer	Valwig
32.	1980/1981	Regine Usinger	1958	22	Rheinhessen	Nackenheim
33.	1981/1982	Hildegard Weber			Palatinate	Gönnheim
34.	1982/1983	Karin Molitor, later Molitor-Hartmann	1962	20	Franconia	Sommerach
35.	1983/1984	Carola Geiger, later Geiger-Kaiser	1962	21	Württemberg	Weinsberg-Grantschen
36.	1984/1985	Ursula Maur			Ahr	Mayschoß
37.	1985/1986	Mechthild Meyer, later Weis	1962	23	Moselle-Saar-Ruwer	Waldrach
38.	1986/1987	Helga Drauz, later Drauz-Oertel	1967	19	Württemberg	Heilbronn
39.	1987/1988	Jutta Fassian, later Fassian-Emmrich			Moselle-Saar-Ruwer	Mehring (Moselle)
40.	1988/1989	Petra Mayer	1966	22	Baden	Schliengen
41.	1989/1990	Renate Schäfer	1968	21	Franconia	Astheim (Volkach)
42.	1990/1991	Birgit Schehl, later Rebholz-Schehl	1969	21	Palatinate	Hainfeld (Palatinate)
43.	1991/1992	Lydia Bollig, later Bollig-Strohm	1970	21	Moselle-Saar-Ruwer	Trittenheim
44.	1992/1993	Astrid Bechtel	1972	20	Rheinhessen	Worms-Heppenheim
45.	1993/1994	Sandra Hake, later Frölich	1970	23	Saale-Unstrut	Freyburg (Unstrut)
46.	1994/1995	Ulrike Neymeyer	1968	26	Baden	Endingen am Kaiserstuhl
47.	1995/1996	Julia Klöckner	1972	23	Nahe	Guldental
48.	1996/1997	Ines Hoffmann	1972	24	Saxony	Dresden
49.	1997/1998	Natascha Thoma, later Thoma-Widmann	1971	26	Baden	Ebringen
50.	1998/1999	Susanne Völker, later Nett	1974	24	Rheinhessen	Oppenheim
51.	1999/2000	Simone Renth, later Renth-Queins	1973	26	Rheinhessen	Schwabenheim an der Selz
52.	2000/2001	Carina Dostert, later Curman	1979	21	Moselle-Saar-Ruwer	Nittel
53.	2001/2002	Petra Gärtner	1980	21	Hessische Bergstraße	Zwingenberg (Bergstraße)
54.	2002/2003	Judith Honrath	1980	22	Nahe	Langenlonsheim
55.	2003/2004	Nicole Then	1980	23	Franconia	Sommerach
56.	2004/2005	Petra Zimmermann	1984	20	Moselle-Saar-Ruwer	Temmels
57.	2005/2006	Sylvia Benzinger, later Benzinger-Kugler	1978	27	Palatinate	Kirchheim an der Weinstraße
58.	2006/2007	Katja Schweder	1980	26	Palatinate	Hochstadt (Palatinate)
59.	2007/2008	Evelyn Schmidt	1983	24	Saxony	Radebeul
60.	2008/2009	Marlies Dumbsky	1985	23	Franconia	Volkach
61.	2009/2010	Sonja Christ, later Christ-Brendemühl	1984	25	Moselle	Oberfell
62.	2010/2011	Mandy Großgarten	1987	22	Ahr	Dernau
63.	2011/2012	Annika Strebel	1987	23	Rheinhessen	Wintersheim
64.	2012/2013	Julia Bertram	1989	22	Ahr	Dernau
65.	2013/2014	Nadine Poss	1991	22	Nahe	Windesheim
66.	2014/2015	Janina Huhn	1989	24	Palatinate	Bad Dürkheim
67.	2015/2016	Josefine Schlumberger	1994	21	Baden	Laufen (Sulzburg)
68.	2016/2017	Lena Endesfelder	1993	23	Moselle	Mehring
69.	2017/2018	Katharina Staab	1990	27	Nahe	Oberhausen an der Nahe
70.	2018/2019	Carolin Klöckner	1995	23	Württemberg	Vaihingen an der Enz
71.	2019/2020	Angelina Vogt	1994	25	Nahe	Weinsheim
72.	2020/2021	Eva Lanzerath	1998	22	Ahr	Walporzheim
73.	2021/2022	Sina Erdrich	1997	22	Baden	Durbach
74.	2022/2023	Katrin Lang	1999	23	Baden	Ebringen
75.	2023/2024	Eva Brockmann	1999	24	Franken	Haibach

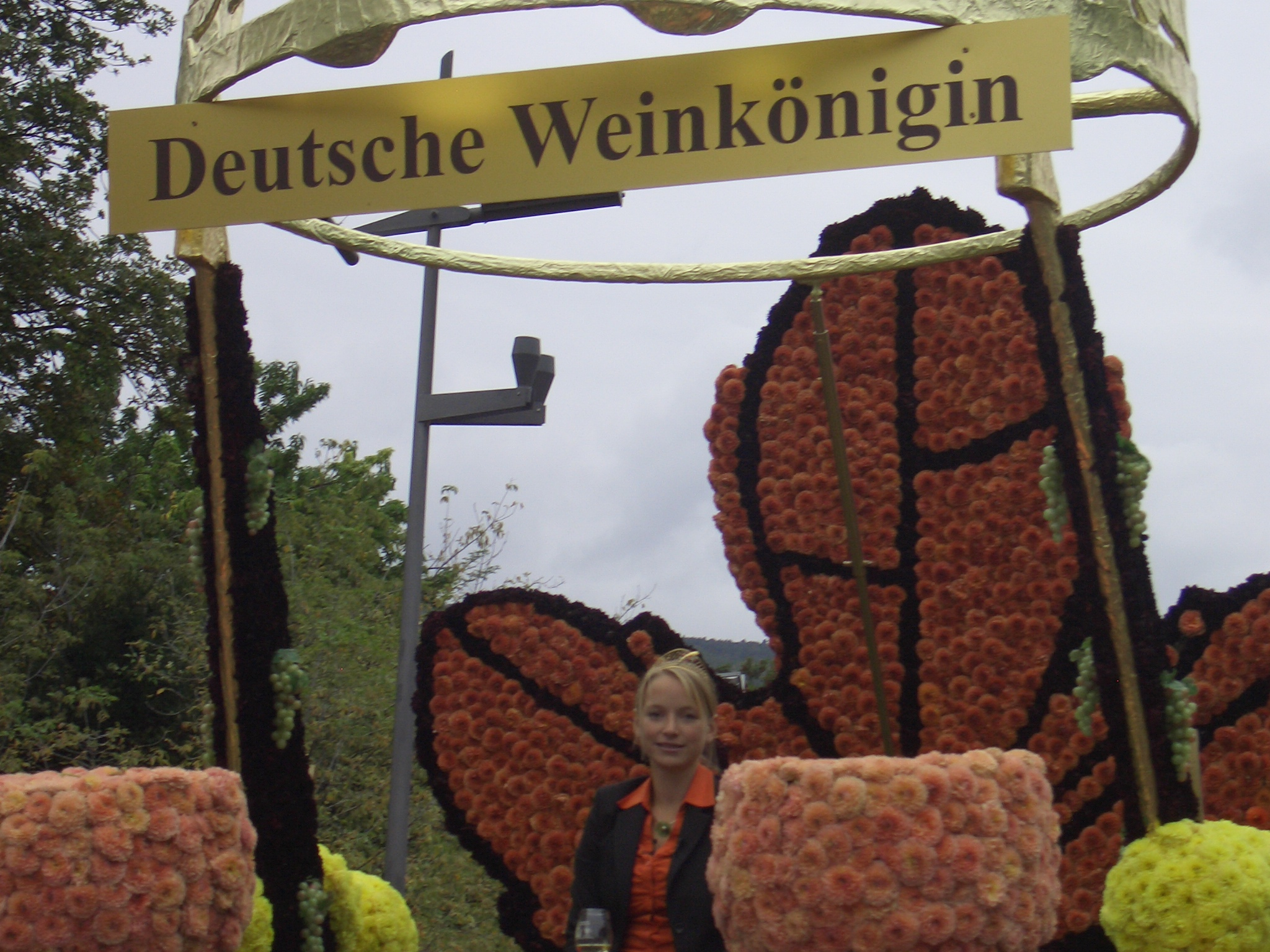
Neustadt Vintage Festival parade: Float with Sonja Christ (Moselle wine region), the German Wine Queen 2009/10

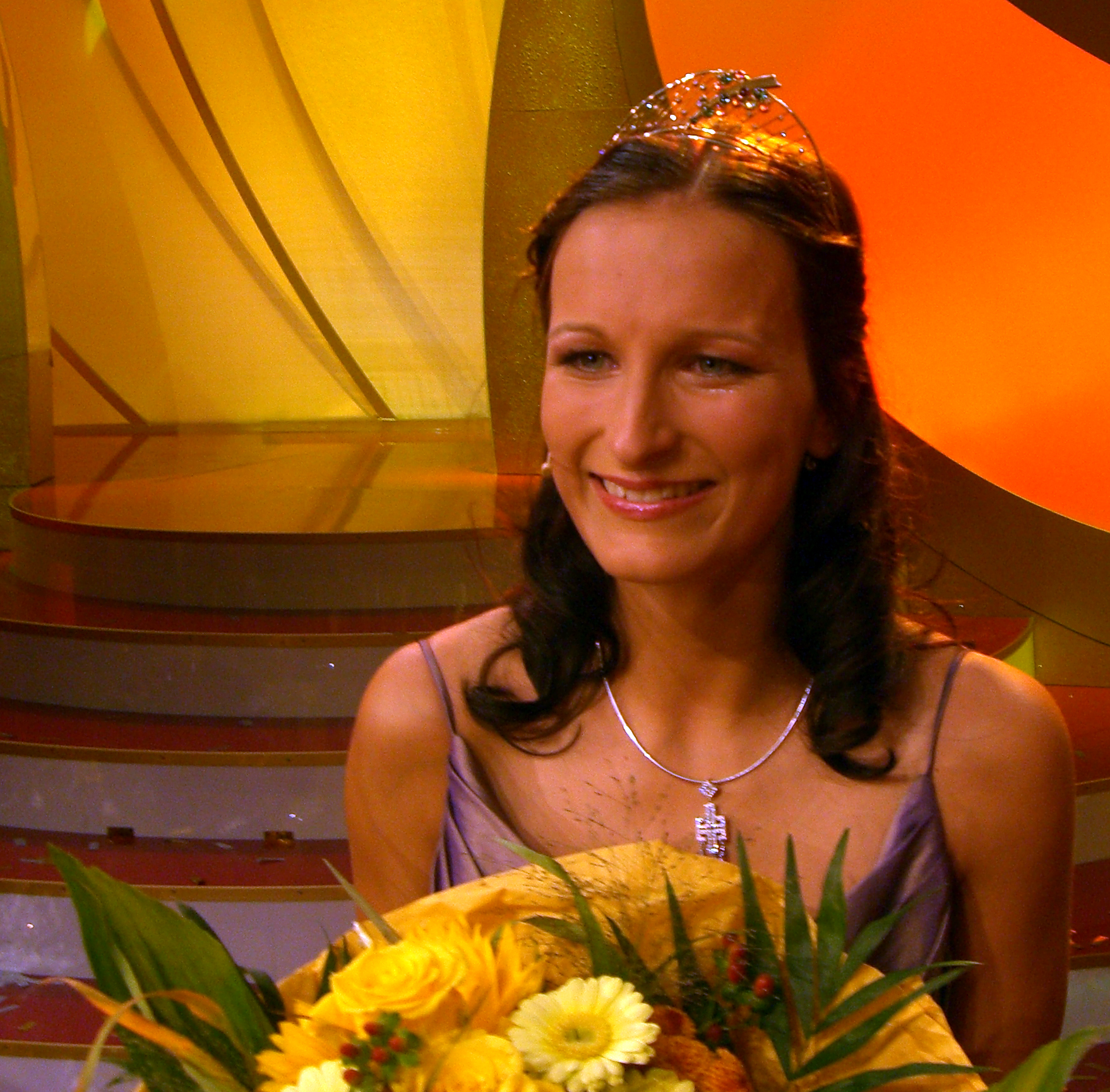
Evelyn Schmidt (2007/2008)

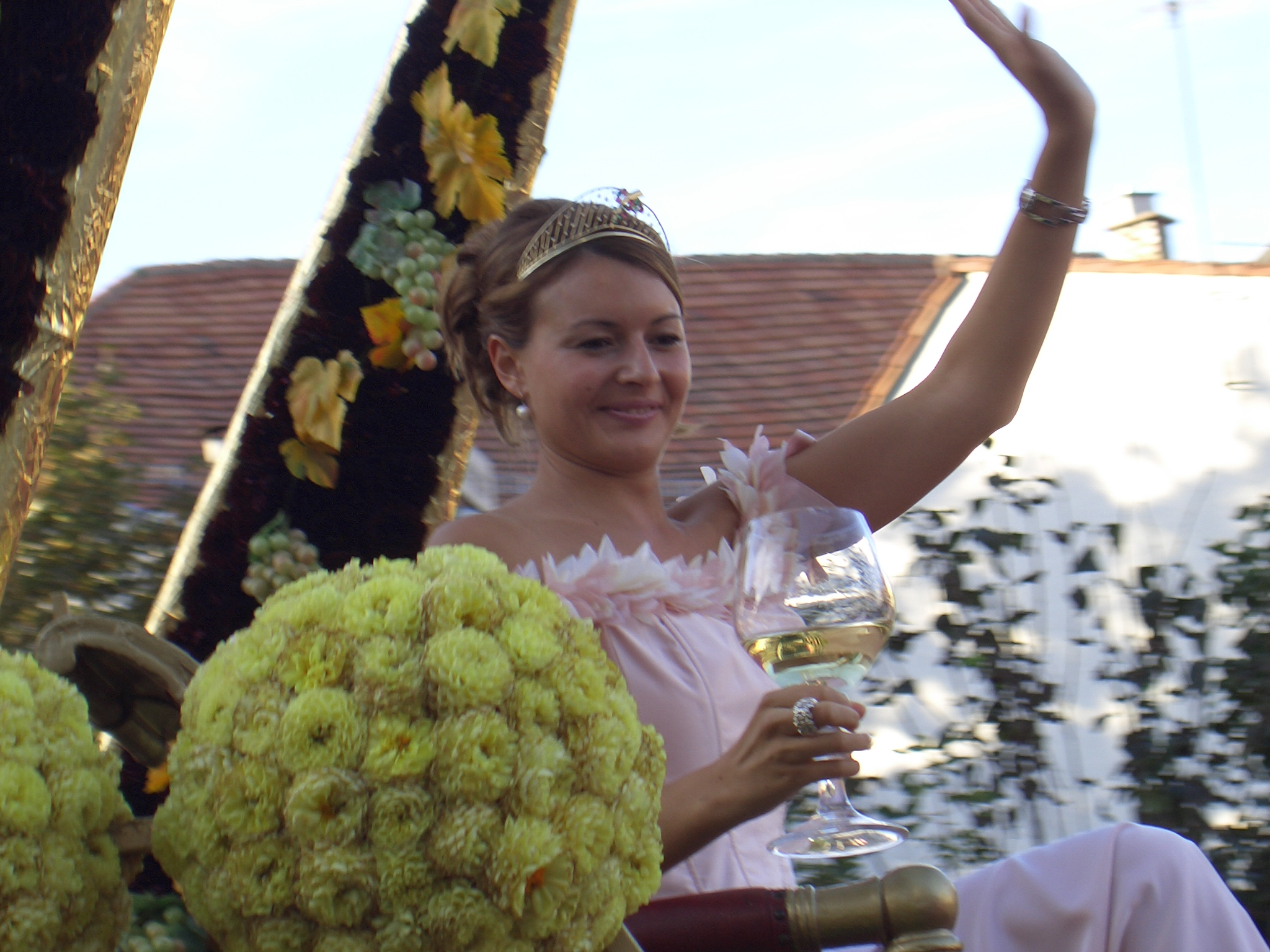
Katja Schweder (2006/2007)

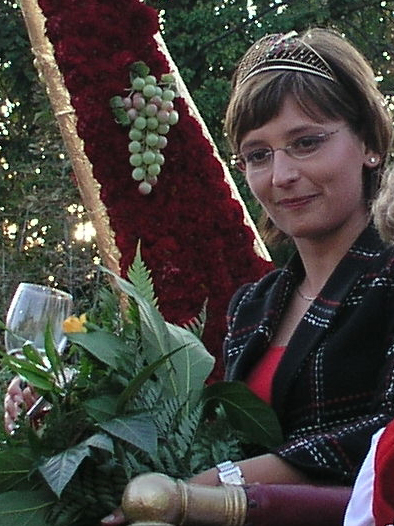
Sylvia Benzinger-Kugler (2005/2006)

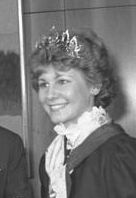
Mechthild Meyer (1985/1986)

==== Frequency of winners by wine region ====
Wine region	Years	Number
Ahr	1962, 1973, 1984, 2010, 2012, 2020	6
Baden	1952, 1977, 1988, 1994, 1997, 2015, 2021	7
Franconia	1957, 1958, 1964, 1968, 1982, 1989, 2003, 2008	8
Hessische Bergstraße	2001	1
Middle Rhine	1951	1
Moselle (until 2005 Moselle-Saar-Ruwer)	1950, 1956, 1963, 1967, 1979, 1985, 1987, 1991, 2000, 2004, 2009, 2016	12
Nahe	1953, 1966, 1970, 1974, 1975, 1995, 2002, 2013, 2017, 2019	10
Palatinate	1949, 1955, 1960, 1965, 1971, 1981, 1990, 2005, 2006, 2014	10
Rheingau	1959, 1969, 1972	3
Rheinhessen	1954, 1961, 1978, 1980, 1992, 1998, 1999, 2011	8
Saale-Unstrut (participating since 1990)	1993	1
Saxony (participating since 1990)	1996, 2007	2
Württemberg	1976, 1983, 1986, 2018	4

== Literature ==
- Wolfgang Diehl (2005), Bacchuszug und Herbstschmüerel : Über Herbstbräuche in der Pfalz und einigen Nachbarregionen, Schriften zur Weingeschichte Nr. 151 (in German), Wiesbaden: Gesellschaft für Geschichte des Weines, ISSN 0302-0967
- Wolfgang Junglas (2008), 60 Jahre Deutsche Weinköniginnen (in German), Frankfurt am Main: Societäts-Verlag, ISBN 978-3-7973-1099-6
- Wolfgang Junglas u. a. (1998), Wein & Krone : 50 Jahre Deutsche Weinköniginnen 1949–1998 (in German), Ingelheim: projekt büro, ISBN 3-9805502-1-4
- Martina Weber (1989), "Die Weinköniginnen", Brauchforschung Regional, Mainzer Studien zur Sprach- und Volksforschung Nr. 14 (in German), Wiesbaden, Stuttgart: Steiner Verlag, pp. 217–224, ISBN 978-3-515-05368-6
