= Lena Endesfelder =

German Wine Queen 2016/2017

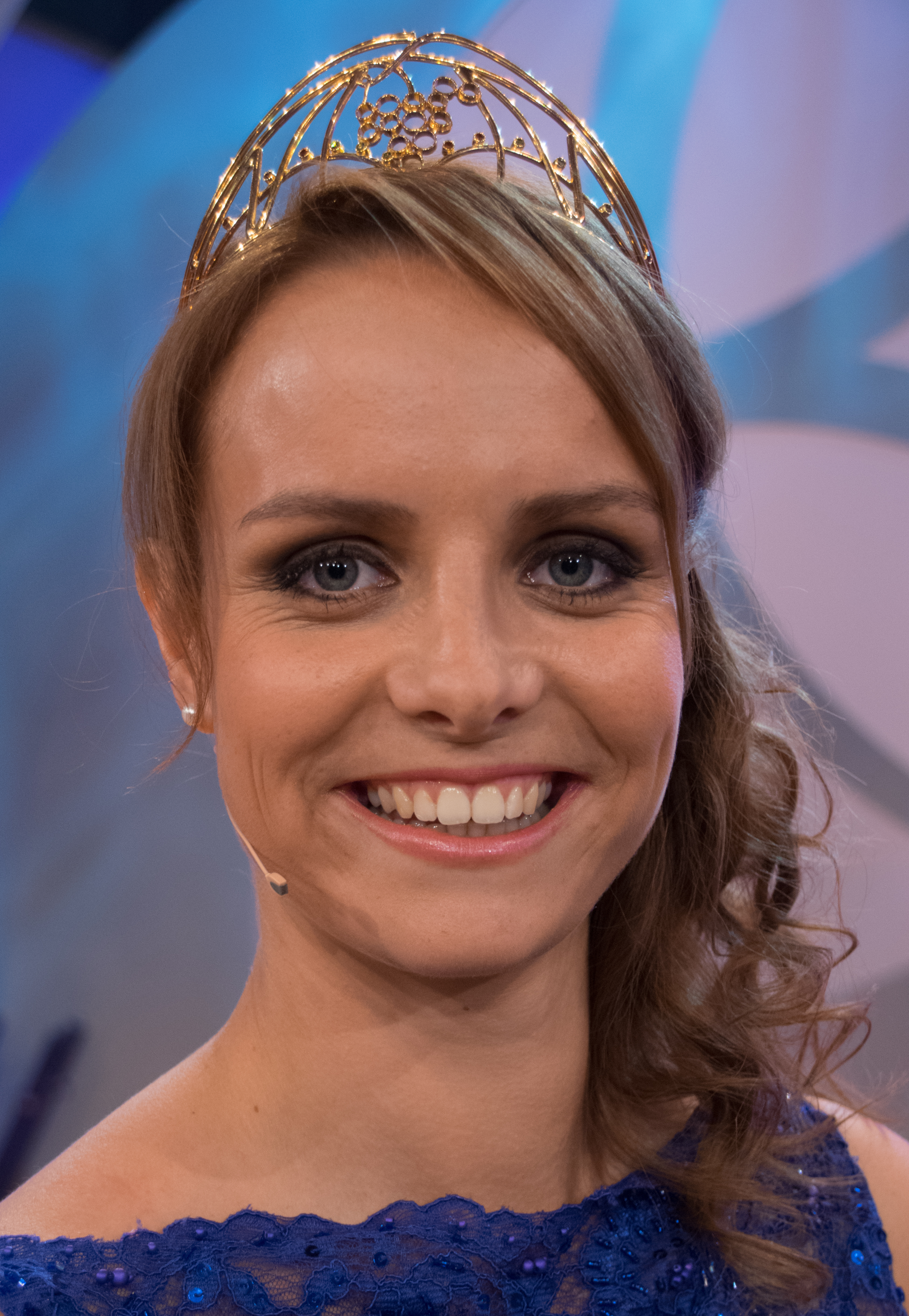
Lena Endesfelder, German Wine Queen 2016/2017

Lena Endesfelder (born 30 December 1992) from Mehring in the wine region of Moselle in Rhineland-Palatinate is the German Wine Queen for 2016/2017. She was elected as the 68th German Wine Queen in 2016 in Mainz as the successor to Josefine Schlumberger. She also became the 12th wine queen from the Moselle region and the third to come from the village of Mehring. The two Wine Princesses elected for twelve months alongside her were Christina Schneider from Nordheim in Franconia and Mara Walz from Ensingen in Württemberg. In that year, the ceremony on the occasion of the 200th anniversary of the wine region of Rhenish Hesse did not take place as normal in Neustadt an der Weinstraße but in the wine city of Mainz.

== Life ==
Lena Endesfelder lives in Mehring on the Moselle, where she grew up. She runs the family vineyard together with her mother and sister. The vineyard has been in her family for three generations.

Endesfelder studied viticulture and oenology at the Hochschule Geisenheim and received a Bachelor of Science degree.

In the final of the 2016 Wine Queen competition she stood out especially because of her presentation, during which she demonstrated that she not only had powerful hands, but also "muscular and dynamic calves suited to steep vineyards". Although she mistook a wine – entering a riesling instead of a pinot blanc – her description of it appealed to the jury, saying that it "had a bouquet of grapefruit, mango and peach."

She is a member of the Mehring Vintner's Dancing Group.

In the previous year, Endesfelder was elected on 11 September 2015 as the Moselle Wine Queen. Hitherto she had been the local wine queen in her home village of Mehring and of the Roman Wine Road.

== Galley ==
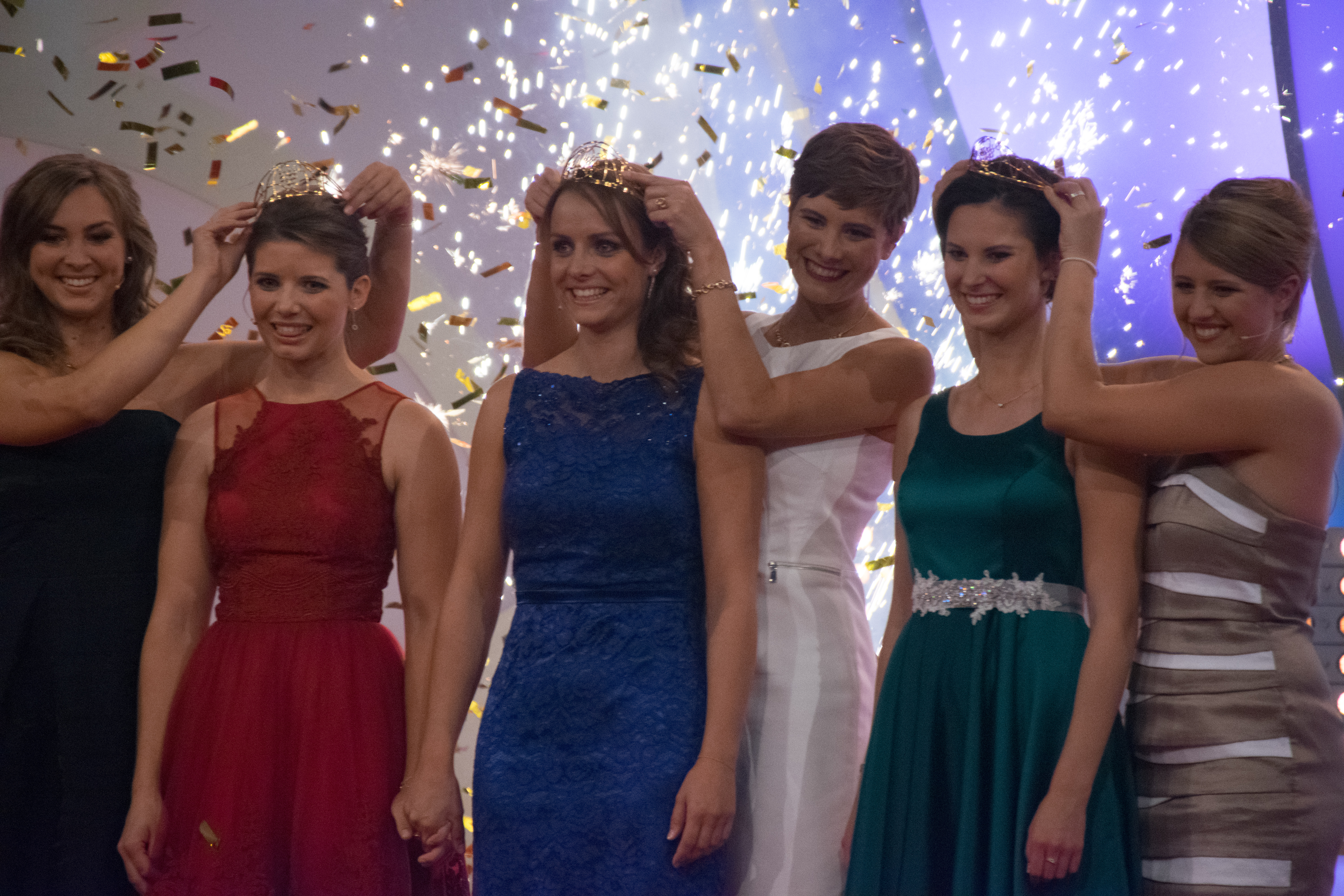
Coronation

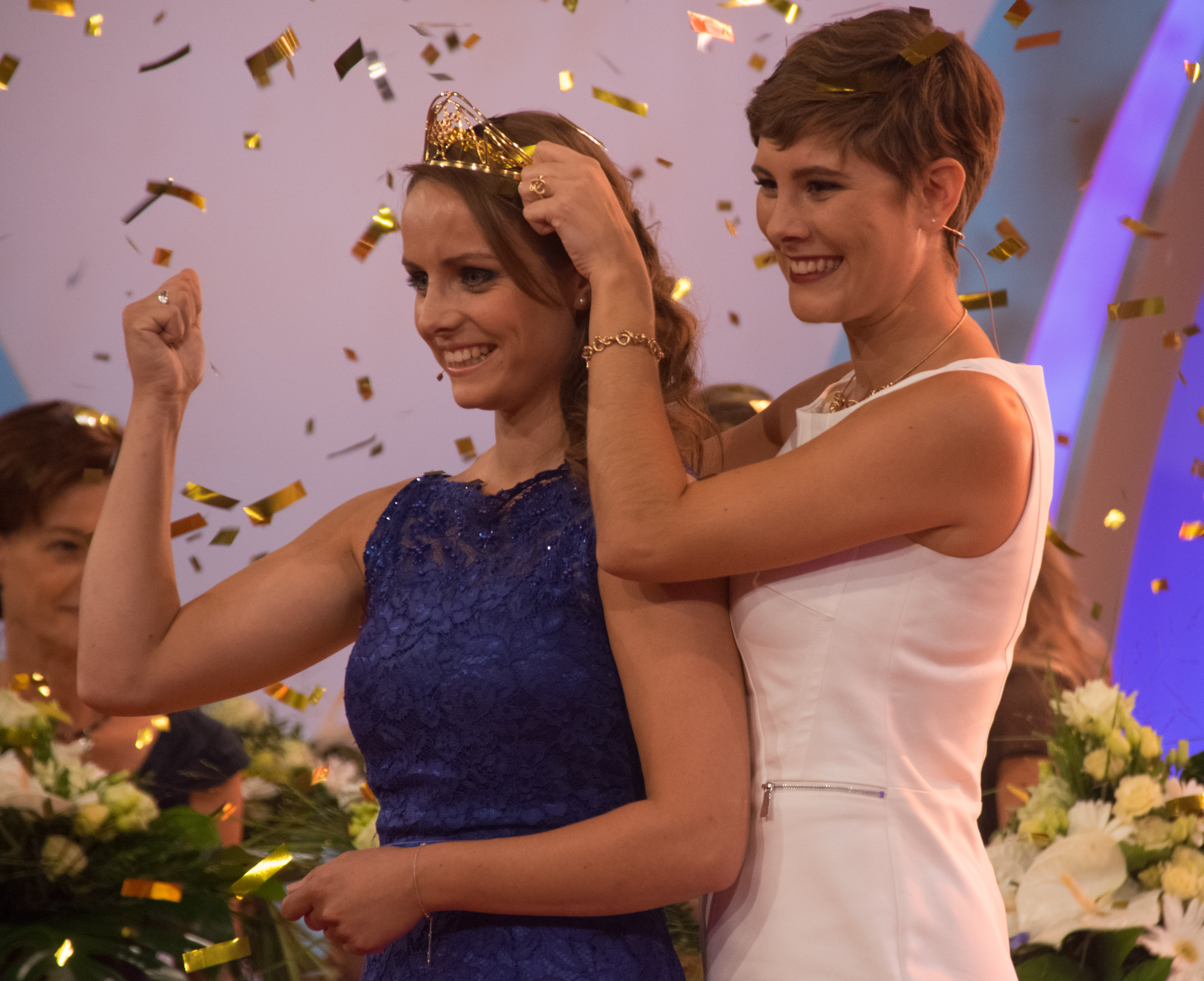
Endesfelder and her predecessor, Josefine Schlumberger

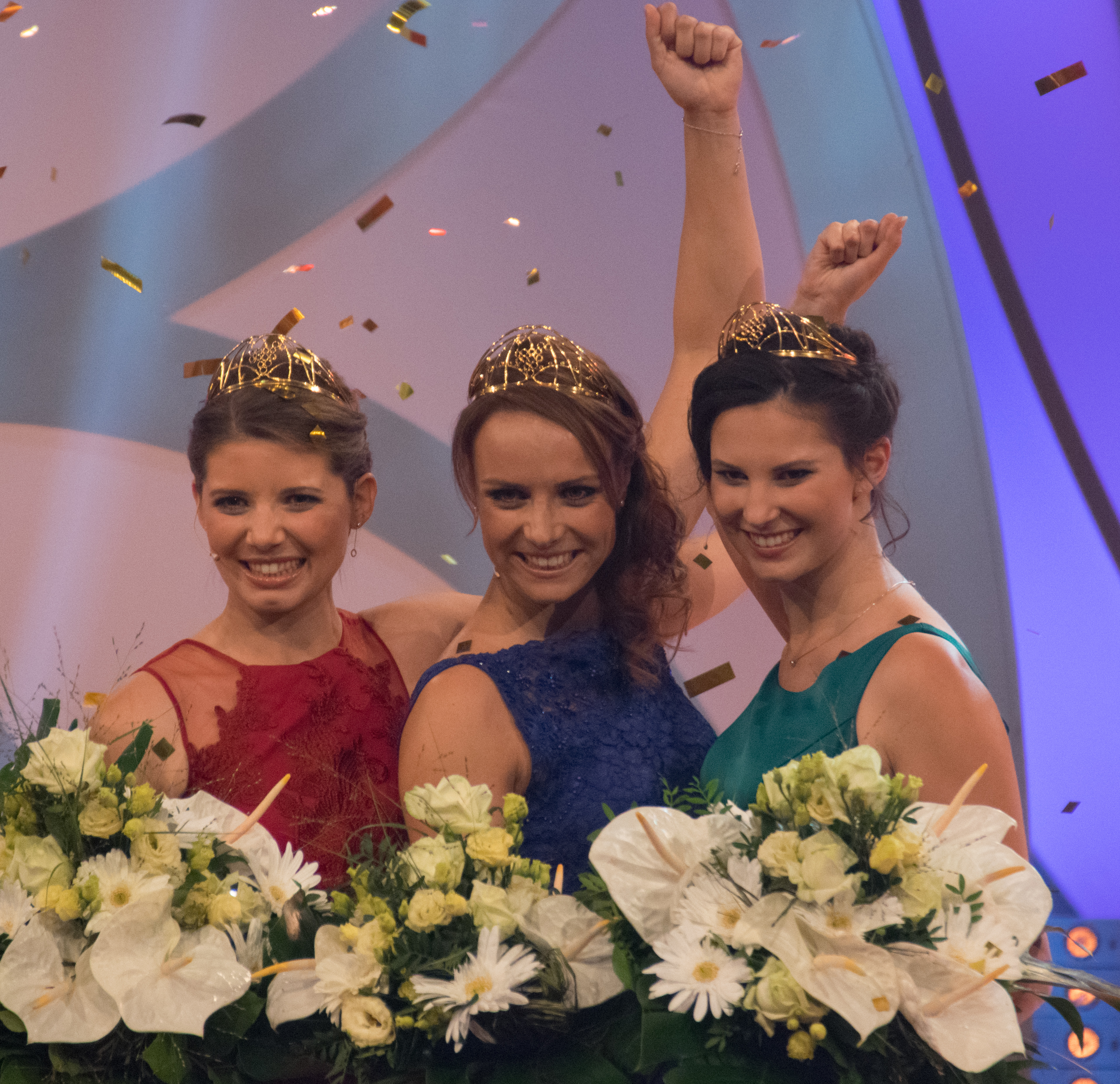
Mara Walz (Württemberg), Lena Endesfelder (Moselle), Christina Schneider (Franconia)

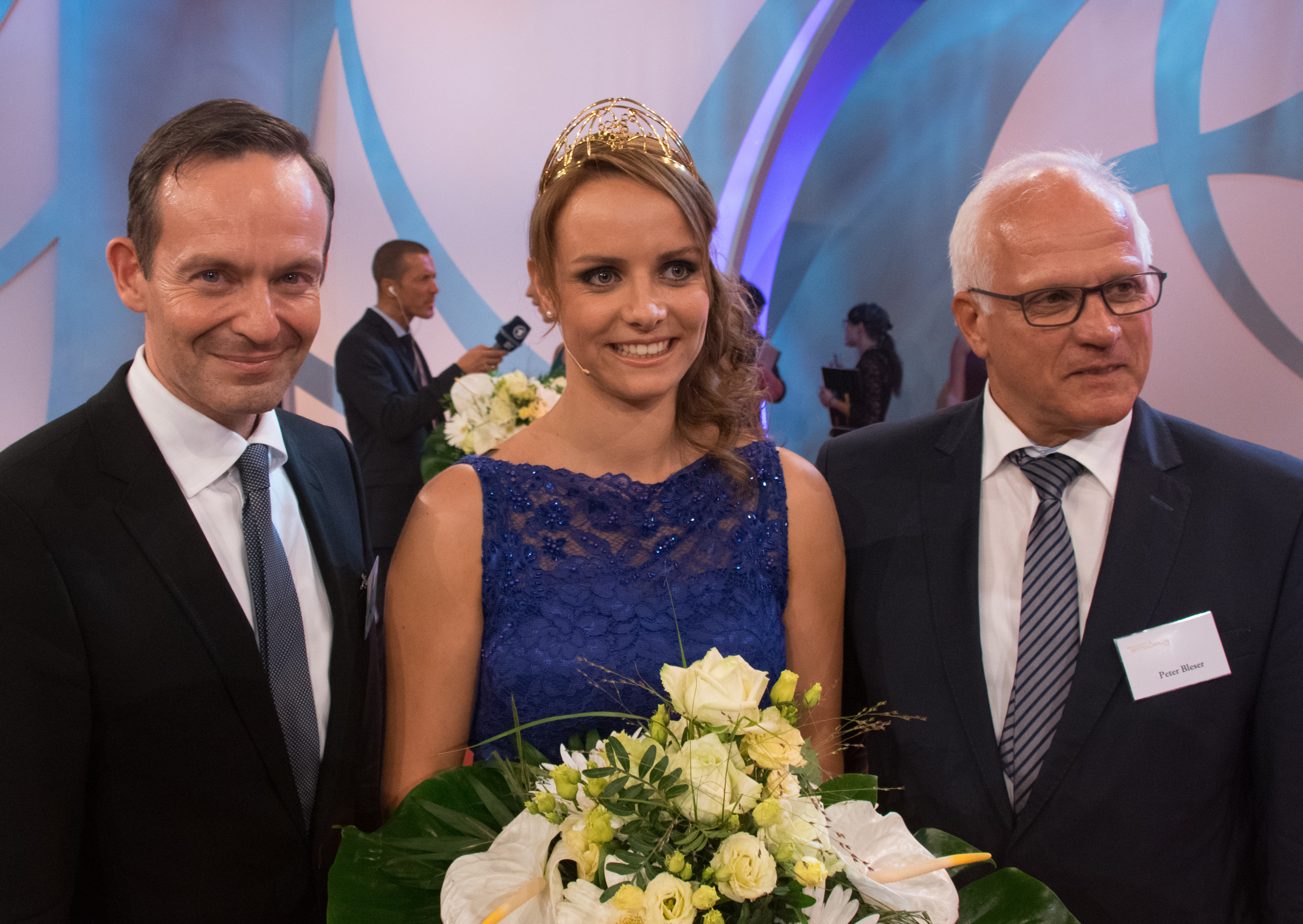
Volker Wissing (Wine Minister of Rhineland-Palatinate), Endesfelder, Peter Bleser (parliamentary state secretary)

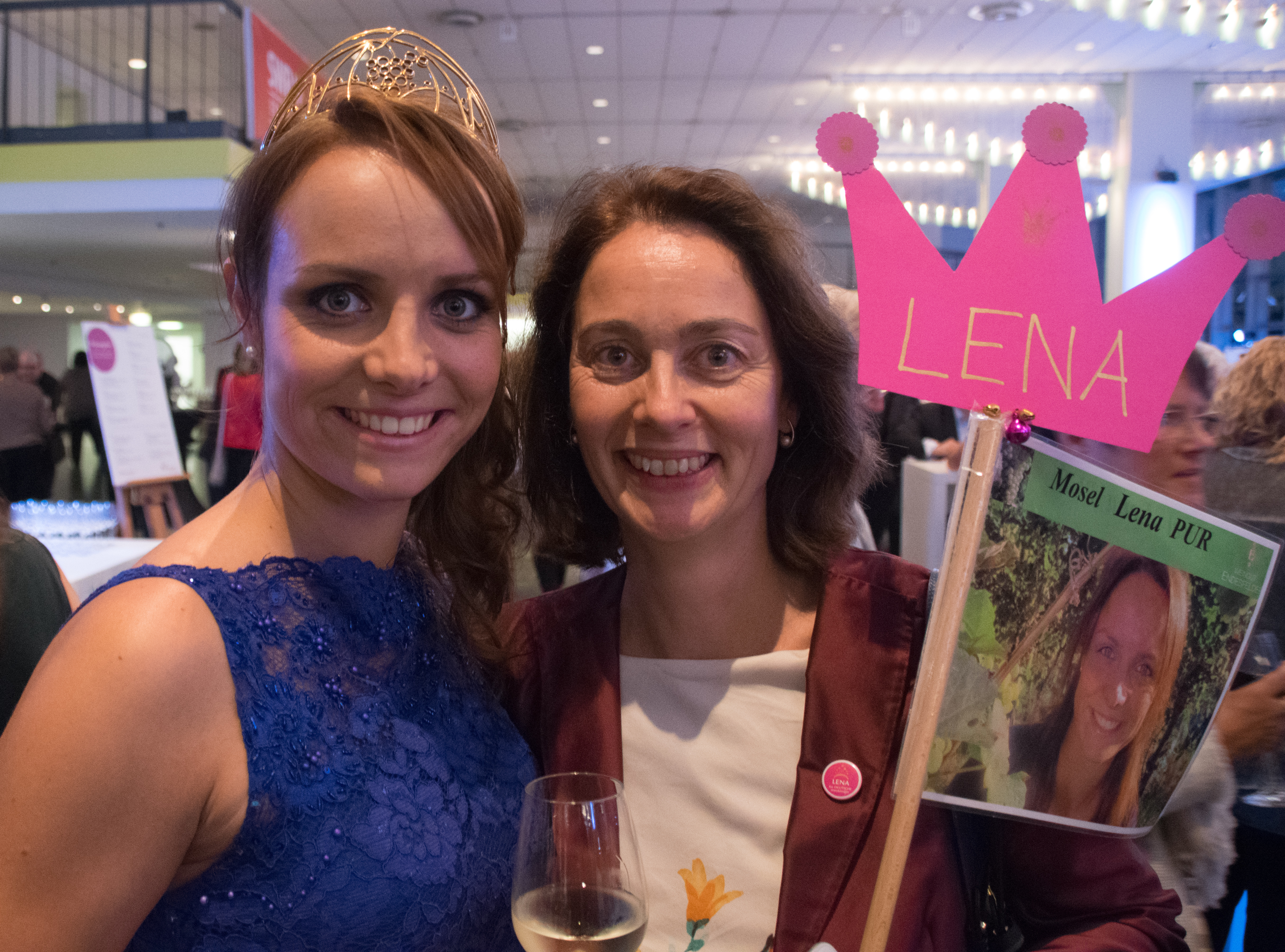
Endesfelder and Katarina Barley

Preceded by Josefine Schlumberger	German Wine Queen; 2016/2017	Succeeded by Katharina Staab
