= Sonja Christ =

German Wine Queen 2009/2010

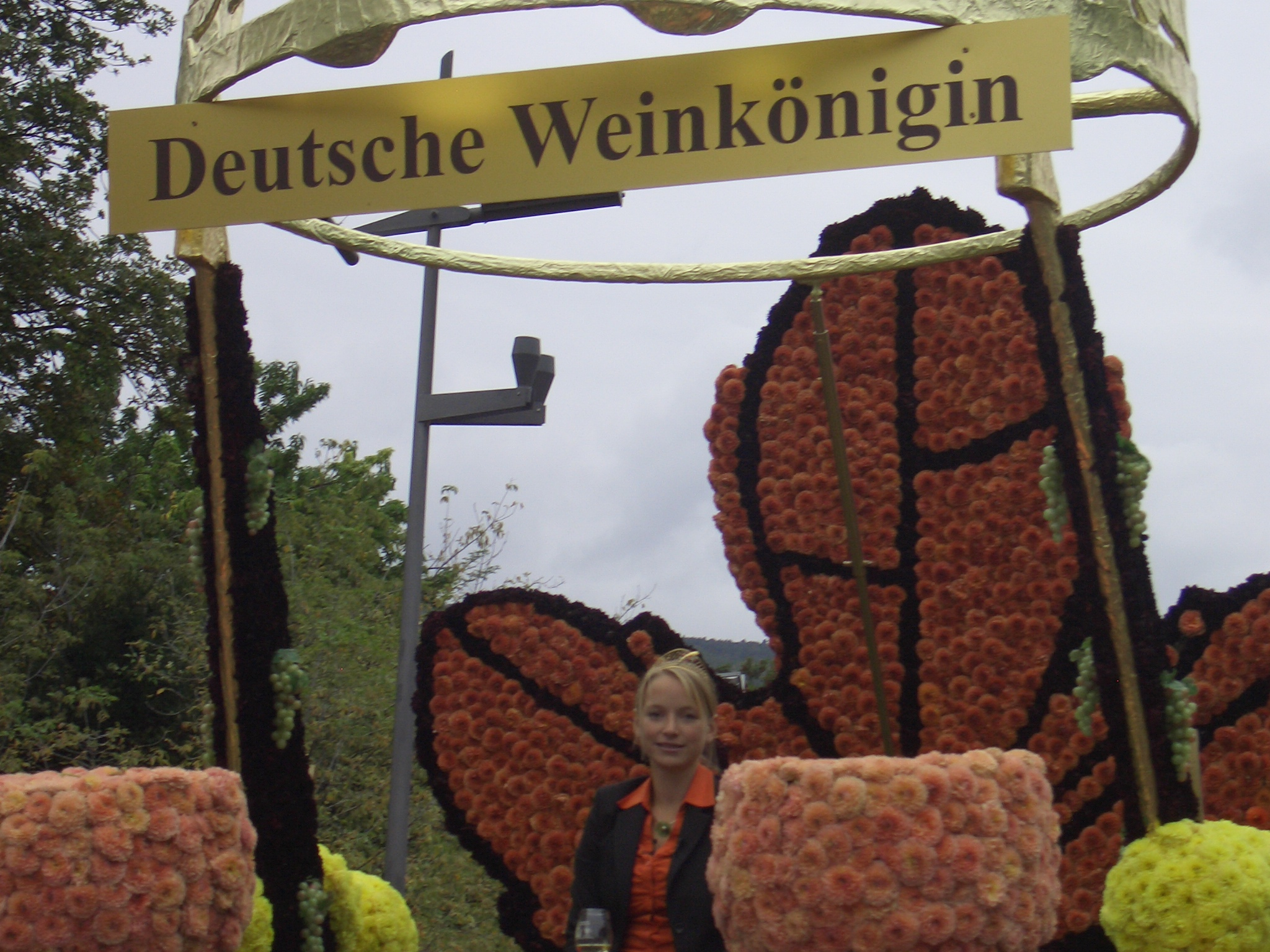
Sonja Christ at the Neustadt Vintners' Parade

Sonja Christ-Brendemühl (née Christ; born 1984), from the German wine region of Mosel ("Moselle"), was chosen as the German Wine Queen on 9 October 2009 in the city of Heilbronn, as the successor to Marlies Dumbsky from the Franconian wine region. The Wine Princesses during her twelve-month reign were Christl Schäfer (Württemberg) and Isabell Kindle (Baden). She is Germany's 61st Wine Queen.

Sonja Christ was born on 1 October 1984 in Oberfell and comes from a Moselle country vintner and innkeeping family. Her father, Alfred, is a restaurateur, and her mother, Gabriele, runs the family vineyard. Until a few years ago she was the fifth generation of her family to run an inn. In 2004/05, the vintner's daughter became the wine queen of her local village of Oberfell. In 2008 she became the Moselle Wine Queen.

Following her Abitur exams at the grammar school of Asterstein in Koblenz, Sonja Christ studied business economics from 2003 to 2008 with particular emphasis on marketing and organisation at the University of Mannheim and spent a term at the ESC Grenoble (France) graduating with a business diploma. As well as her native language of German, she also speaks fluent English, French and Italian. Since Feb 2009 she has worked as a head wine taster at the wine magazine selection in Mainz. Following her appointment as the German Wine Queen she became the ambassador of German wine-growers and their products in a programme of 250 appearances in Germany and abroad during the year that followed. From 2018-2022 she worked as research assistant at the University of Koblenz and Landau and has completed a PhD there. Since 2022, she is a professor for public relations at the Hochschule Bonn-Rhein-Sieg.

Preceded by Marlies Dumbsky	German Wine Queen; 2009/2010	Succeeded by Mandy Großgarten
