= Mandy Gieler =

German Wine Queen 2010/2011

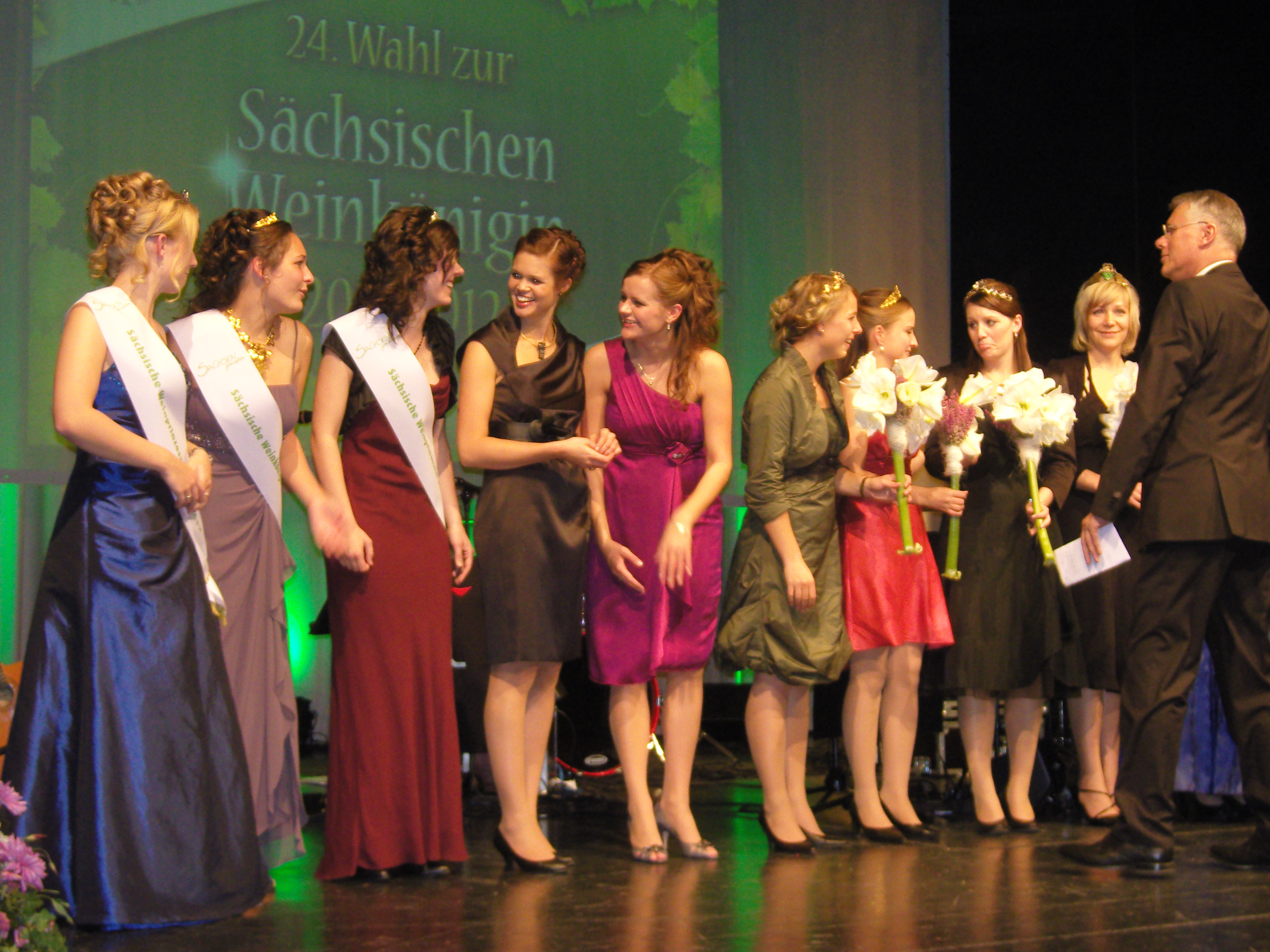
Großgarten (fourth from left) during the 2011–2012 Saxon Wine Queen competition

Mandy Gieler (née Großgarten; born 14 October 1987) from the German wine region of Ahr was chosen as the 62nd German Wine Queen in October 2010 in the town of Neustadt an der Weinstraße, as the successor to Sonja Christ from the Moselle wine region.

== Family ==
Mandy Gieler was born on 14 October 1987 in Dernau and comes from a family that who have worked in viticulture for several generations as a secondary occupation. The family vineyard has an area of one hectare and is mainly stocked with pinot noir (Spätburgunder).

== Education and training ==
From 1994 to 1998, Mandy Gieler went to St. Martin's Primary School in Dernau and then, from 2007, to the private grammar school of the Ursulines, the Calvarienberg, in Bad Neuenahr-Ahrweiler. In the winter semester of 2007, she began studying chemistry with materials science at the Bonn-Rhein-Sieg University of Applied Sciences (BRSU), which she interrupted during her time as a wine queen. Immediately after the end of her "reign" she resumed studies in October 2011 at the University of Münster with the aim of completing her master's degree in industrial chemistry.

== Wine queen ==
Gieler was elected as the Ahr Wine Queen for 2009–2010 before being selected as the German Wine Queen. The German Wine Princesses during her twelve-month reign were Katja Bohnert (Baden) and Melanie Unsleber (Franconia).

Preceded by Sonja Christ	German Wine Queen; 2010/2011	Succeeded by Annika Strebel
