= Ahr Wine Queen =

Female regional wine representative

The Ahr Wine Queen (German: Ahr-Weinkönigin) is a young woman from the German wine region of Ahr in the state of Rhineland-Palatinate who is elected for a year to represent and promote the wine industry of that region. The title has been awarded since 1951. Since 1973 she has been elected at the annual Wine Market of the Ahr (Weinmarkt der Ahr). Hitherto the queen had been chosen at various other ceremonies. In the year following her 'reign' the Ahr Wine Queen is eligible to run for the contest to elect the German Wine Queen.

== List of Ahr Wine Queens ==
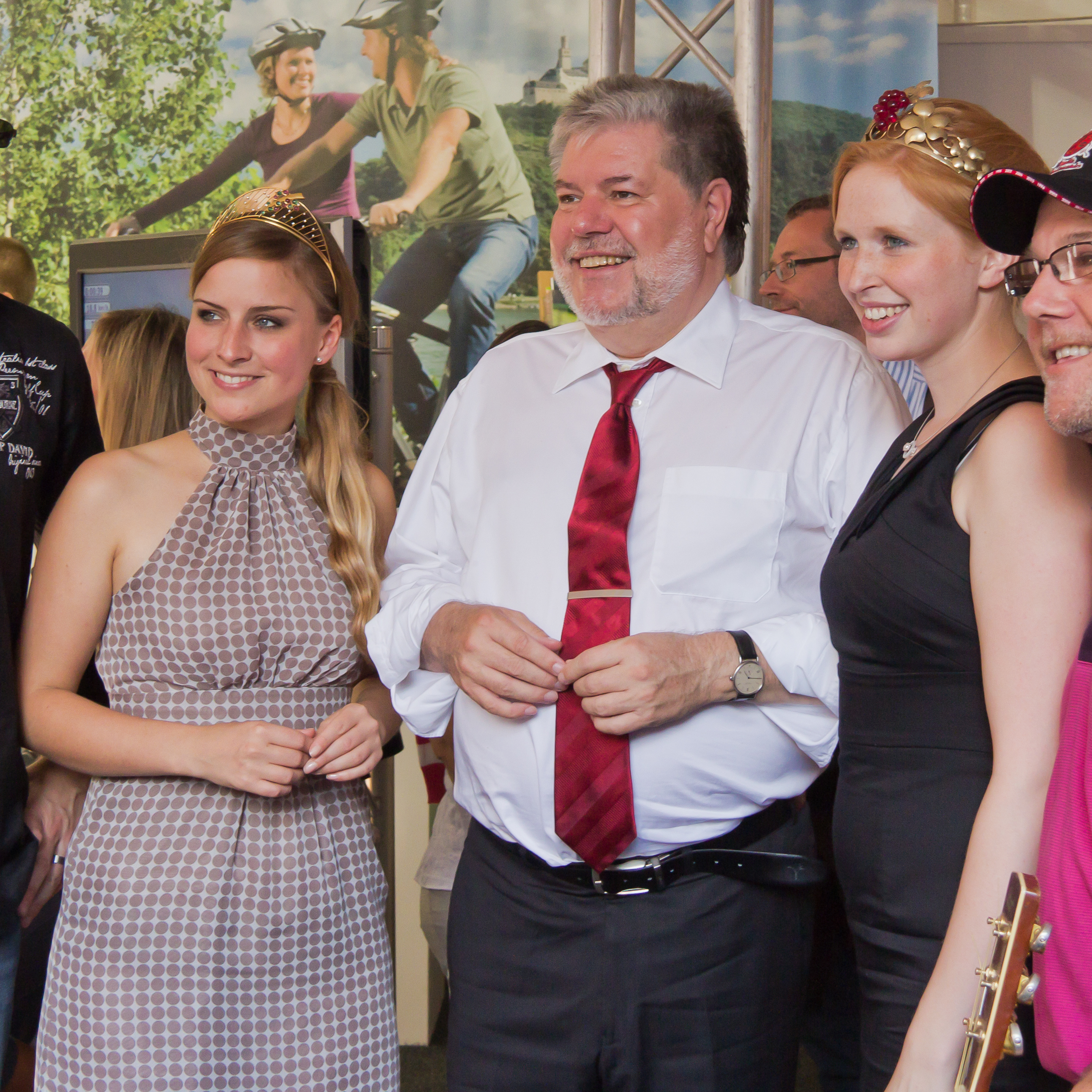
German Wine Queen, Annika Strebel, in 2011/2012, Minister President, Kurt Beck, and the Ahr Wine Queen for 2011/12, Julia Bertram.

1951/52 Maria Rosenbaum, Altenahr
1961/62 Maritta Heinzen (Ahrweiler) - German Wine Queen in 1962/63
1965/66 Marlies Trarbach, Dernau
1967/68 Maria Sonntag, Heimersheim
1968/69 Magdalene Ley, Mayschoß
1970/71 Ingrid Näkel (Dernau)
1971/72 Marga Stodden (Rech)
1972/73 Ruth Stodden (Rech)
1973/74 Ingrid Kurth (Bachem) - German Wine Queen in 1973/74
1974/75 Marianne Hostert (Rech)
1975/76 Freifrau von Kauder von Schweinitz und Krain (Bachem)
1976/77 Edith Klaes (Altenahr)
1977/78 Karin Knieps (Ahrweiler)
1978/79 Bernadette Rossi (Altenahr)
1979/80 Ursula Grimmiger (Walporzheim)
1980/81 Andrea Krämer (Mayschoß)
1981/82 Renate Fuhrmann (Heimersheim)
1982/83 Hildegard Linden (Heimersheim)
1983/84 Annegret Neiß (Dernau)
1984 Ursula Maur (Mayschoß) - German Wine Queen in 1984/85
1984/85 Edith Fuhrmann (Heimersheim)
1985/86 Birgit Ley (Altenahr)
1986/87 Claudia Schreiner (Rech)
1987/88 Bärbel Krätz (Mayschoß)
1988/89 Anke Knieps (Walporzheim)
1989/90 Manuela Wirtz (Ahrweiler)
1990/91 Martina Küls (Ahrweiler)
1991/92 Nicole Schauten (Dernau)
1992/93 Christiane Louis (Heimersheim)
1993/94 Anita Krämer (Dernau)
1994/95 Andrea Schreier (Walporzheim)
1995/96 Stefanie Koll (Ahrweiler)
1996/97 Sissy Winand (Rech)
1997/98 Sandra Berthel (Dernau)
1998/99 Sabrina Koll (Ahrweiler)
1999/00 Martina Flohe (Walporzheim)
2000/01 Martina Klein (Dernau)
2001/02 Annika Gasper (Altenahr)
2002/03 Karina Weinand (Mayschoß)
2003/04 Desirée Dresen (Mayschoß)
2004/05 Katrin Küpper (Heimersheim)
2005/06 Catharina Stein (Walporzheim)
2006/07 Diana Knieps (Ahrweiler)
2007/08 Stephanie Bertram (Dernau)
2008/09 Julia Linden (Heimersheim)
2009/10 Mandy Großgarten (Dernau) - German Wine Queen in 2010/11
2010/11 Alina Bäcker (Mayschoß)
2011/12 Julia Bertram (Dernau) - German Wine Queen in 2012/13
2012/13 Julia Migend (Mayschoß)
2013/14 Jennifer Knieps (Walporzheim)
2014/15 Viktoria Kugel (Walporzheim)
2015/16 Michelle Skruth (Bachem)
2016/17 Theresa Ullrich (Ahrweiler)
2017/18 Irena Schmitz (Ahrweiler)
2018/19 Annika Schooß (Ahrweiler)
2019–2021 Eva Lanzerath (Walporzheim) – German Wine Queen in 2020/2021
2023/24 Katja Hermann (Rech)
