= Marlies Dumbsky =

German wine queen

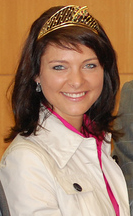
Marlies Dumbsky in 2009

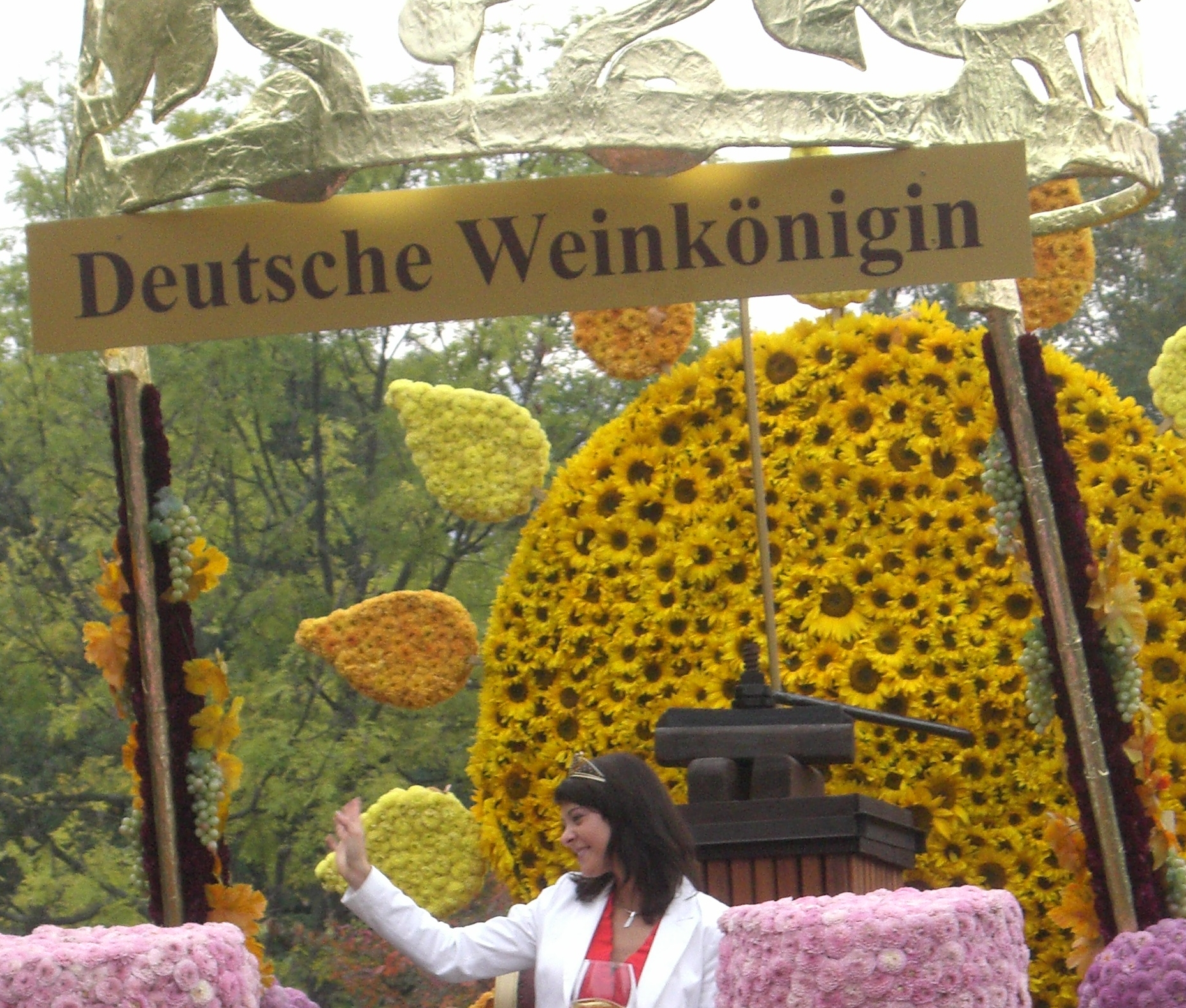
Marlies Dumbsky at the Neustadt Vintners' Parade in 2008

Marlies Dumbsky (born 1985), from the German wine region of Franconia, was the 2008/09 German Wine Queen. She was chosen on 10 October 2008 in the wine town of Neustadt an der Weinstraße as the successor to Evelyn Schmidt from Radebeul in Saxony as Germany's 60th national Wine Queen. The two wine princesses during her reign were Andrea Köninger from Baden and Sarah Schmitt from the Nahe.

Marlies Dumbsky was born on 20 October 1985 in Volkach and comes from a Franconian vintner family that has been in the wine-growing business since 1837. Her parents come from the vineyard of Weingut Dumbsky-Marienhof in Volkach. From 2004 to 2006 she was the local wine princess of her home town. In March 2008 she became the 53rd Franconian Wine Queen. In Neustadt an der Weinstraße she won the German Wine Queen title against five other competitors. She is a trained vintner and "Franconian Wine Experience" tourist guide and speaks several languages in addition to her native German: English, French and Spanish. She is currently doing media and communication studies in Erfurt. She is a native of Volkach and a passionate motorcyclist.

During her time as the German Wine Queen, Marlies Dumbsky toured the US to promote German wine and helped launch a new initiative "Tastings in the Sky" involving a partnership between the German Wine Institute and the German airline, Lufthansa.

Preceded by Evelyn Schmidt	German Wine Queen; 2008/2009	Succeeded by Sonja Christ
