= Nadine Poss =

German wine queen

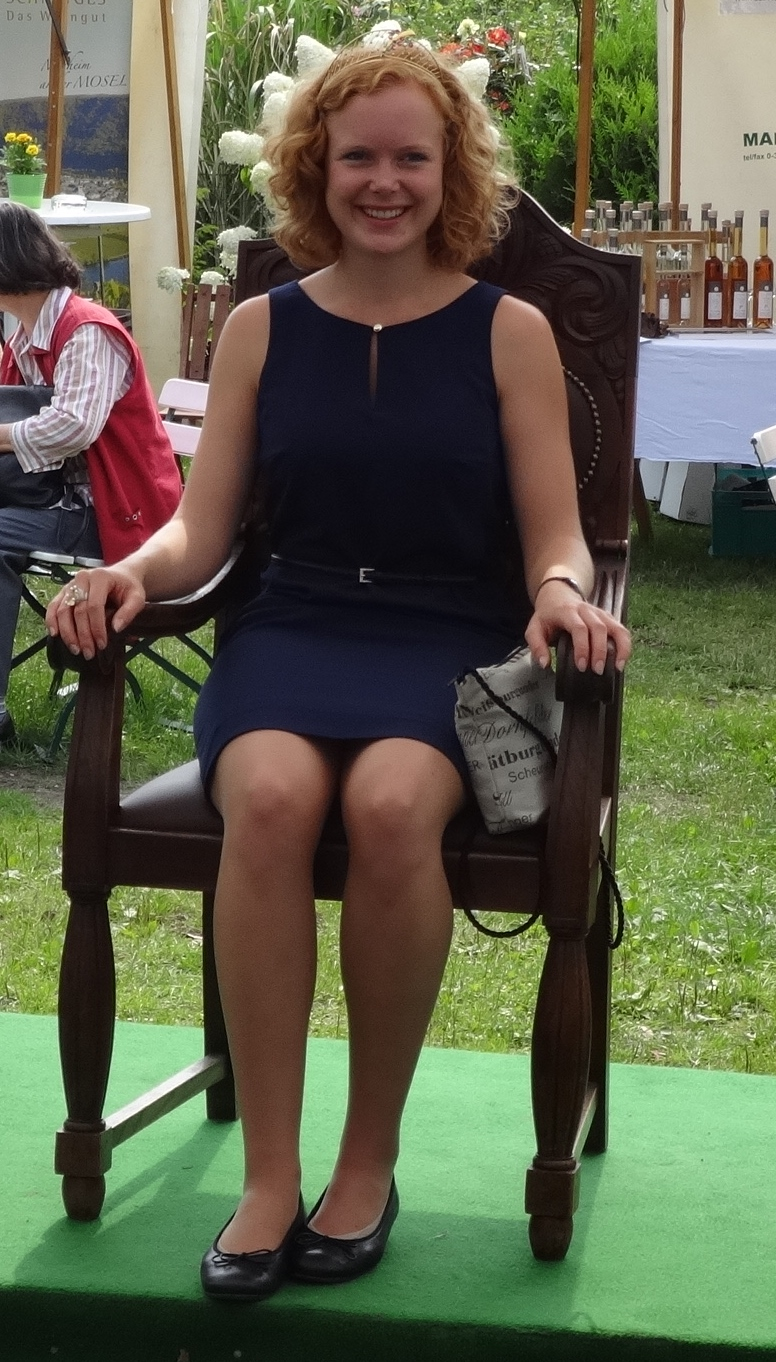
Nadine Poss in the Späth-Arboretum in Berlin, July 2014

Nadine Poss (born 1991), from Windesheim in the German wine region of Nahe, was chosen as the 65th German Wine Queen on 13 September 2013 in Offenburg as the successor to Julia Bertram from the Ahr wine region. She thus became the eighth German Wine Queen from the Nahe. The wine princesses during her twelve-month reign are Ramona Diegel (Rheinhessen) and Sabine Wagner (Rheingau). The German Wine Queen is traditionally crowned in the town of Neustadt an der Weinstraße. By exception that year the ceremony took place in Offenburg. The occasion was the 100th anniversary of the Baden Vintners' Association.

== Life ==
Nadine Poss was born on 8 May 1991 and grew up in Windesheim in the county of Bad Kreuznach at her parents' vineyard, the Weingut Poss, which is one of the leading Burgundy vineyards in the Nahe valley. From 1997 to 2001 she went to the primary school in Guldental and from 2001 to 2010 to the Alfred Delp School in Hargesheim. After her Abitur exams she went to Spain for six months, where she lived with an Andalusian family and went to school locally to learn Spanish.

In 2010 she underwent a placement in wine exporting at Schloss Johannisberg and the Bingen winery of Reh Kendermann. Since 2011 she has been studying international winemaking at the Hochschule Geisenheim. She sees her future at her parents vineyard.

On 10 November 2012 she was elected as the regional wine queen of the Nahe valley.

As Germany's national wine ambassador, Poss has travelled around the world in her role promoting German wines. In June 2014 she helped to launch the "Riesling Weeks" campaign in Hong Kong, joining the Consul General of Germany at a special dinner to celebrate the event. Later that month, Poss was in Canada to host "Generation Riesling" in Vancouver, and, in July 2014, Poss hosted the "Summer of Riesling Concert Cruise" in New York Harbor as part of the "31 Days of German Riesling" in the United States.

In Jan 2015 she was interviewed by Cru Magazine, who described her as "the representative of the German wine industry."

Preceded by Julia Bertram	German Wine Queen; 2013/2014	Succeeded by Janina Huhn
