= Julia Bertram =

German Wine Queen 2012/2013

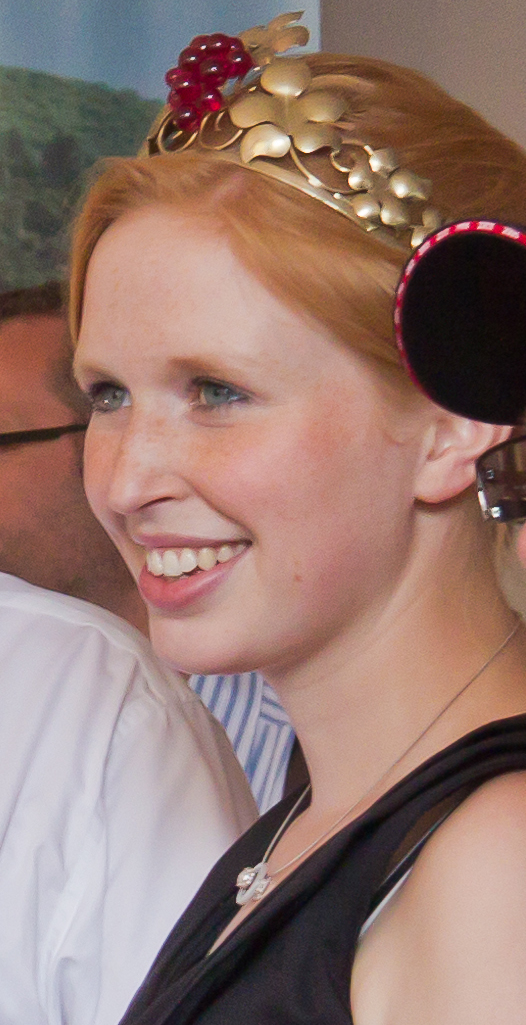
Julia Bertram when she was still the Ahr Wine Queen in 2011

Julia Bertram (born 1989) from Dernau in the German wine region of Ahr was crowned as the 64th German Wine Queen on 29 September 2012 in the town of Neustadt an der Weinstraße as the successor to Annika Strebel from the Rheinhessen wine region. The German Wine Princesses during her twelve-month reign were Natalie Henninger from Baden and Anna Hochdörffer from the Palatinate.

== Life ==
Julia Bertram was born on 24 December 1989 and initially went to St. Martin's Primary School in Dernau and the Kloster Kalvarienberg grammar school in Bad Neuenahr-Ahrweiler. Subsequently, she underwent a placement at the vineyard of Ahr vintner, Werner Näkel, before studying viticulture and oenology, alongside her predecessor, in Geisenheim. In 2012 she was awarded her Bachelor of Science degree for this course. Her aim was to complete a semester in "International Winemaking" at the same college.

From 10 June 2011 to September 2012, Bertram was the Ahr Wine Queen before she took part in the German Wine Queen competition.

Preceded by Annika Strebel	German Wine Queen; 2012/2013	Succeeded by Nadine Poss
