= Saxon Wine Queen =

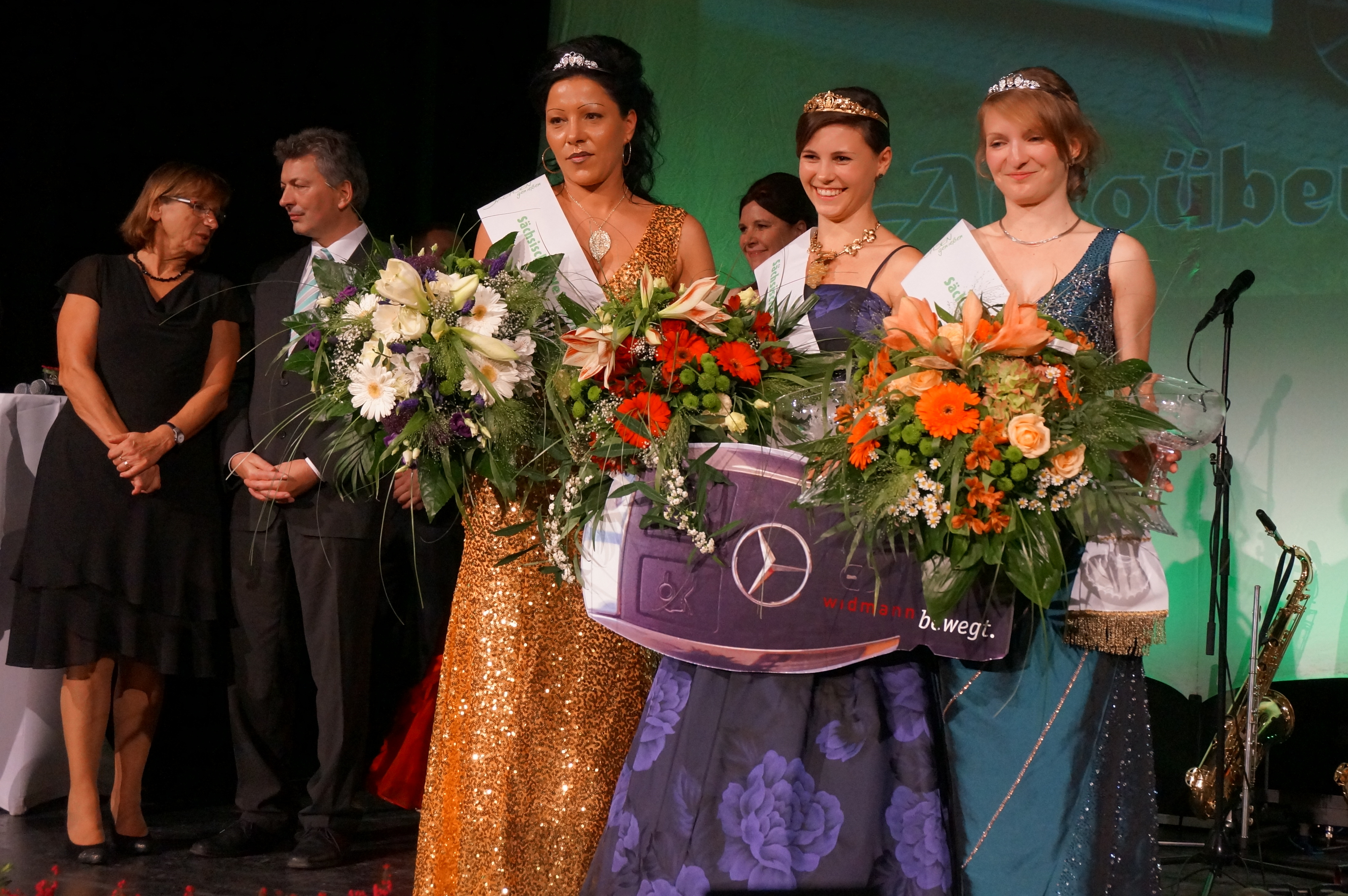
The Saxon Wine Queen 2014/2015, Michaela Tutschke (c) and her wine princesses, Kati Hoffmann (l) and Jana Jordan (r)

The Saxon Wine Queen (German: Sächsische Weinkönigin) is a woman from the wine industry who is chosen for a year to represent the wine region of Saxony in Germany. In the year following her 'reign' she is entitled to run for election as the German Wine Queen.

== Process ==
The election of the Saxon Wine Queen takes place annually in November in the stock exchange at Coswig. Until 2011, it took place in the central inn at Weinböhla. The second and third-placed candidates become the Saxon Wine Princesses. Until 2010/2011 the third-placed candidate was also named as the Saxon Sekt Princess (Sächsische Sektprinzessin). After a year in office, the Saxon Wine Queen, along with the other 12 regional wine queens, may participate in the elections for the German Wine Queen.

== Saxon wine queens ==
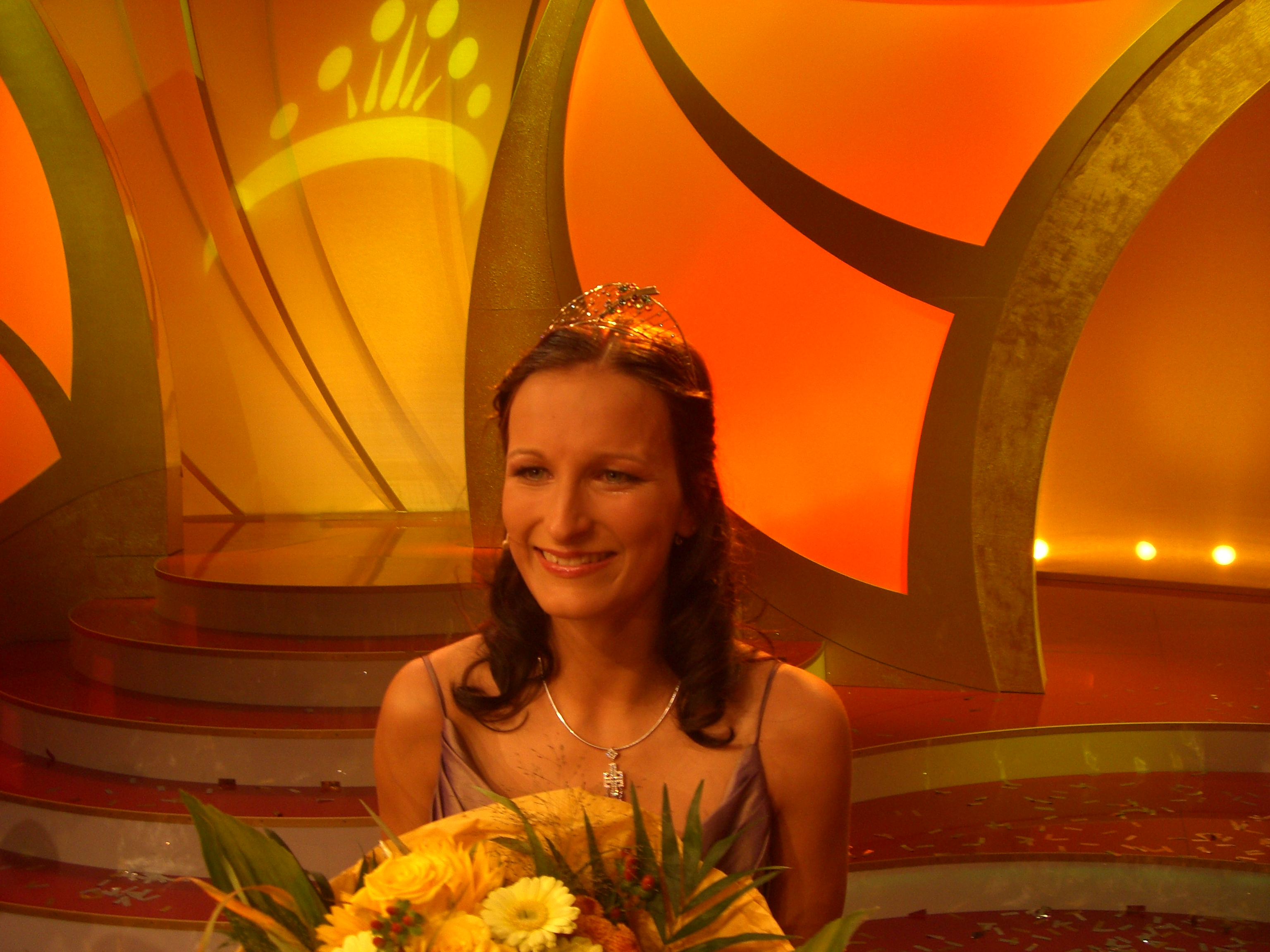
Evelyn Schmidt, Saxon Wine Queen in 2006/07 and German Wine Queen in 2007/08

- 1987/88: Irene Weisflug
- 1988/89: Irene Weisflug
- 1989/90: Gudrun Päßler
- 1990/91: Silke Schlapp
- 1991/92: Silke Schlapp
- 1992/93: Anke Römer
- 1993/94: Jana Ulrich
- 1994/95: Ivonne Rückhardt
- 1995/96: Edda Schmidt
- 1996: Ines Hoffmann (born 1972 in Dresden); German Wine Queen in 1996/97
- 1996/97: Anke Naumann
- 1997/98: Anja Bahner-Schumann
- 1998/99: Annett Meichsner
- 1999/2000: Bärbel Schurr
- 2000/01: Bianca Schumann
- 2001/02: Antje Scheerbaum
- 2002/03: Antje Wiedemann (born 1978 in Hoyerswerda); German Wine Princess in 2003/04
- 2003/04: Fanny Weisflug (born 1977 in Meißen)
- 2004/05: Sandy Horgai (born 1979 in Dresden)
- 2005/06: Christine Liepke (born 22 May 1983 in Radebeul)
- 2006/07: Evelyn Schmidt (born 10 April 1983 in Hoyerswerda); German Wine Queen in 2007/08
- 2007/08: Irene Grusla (born 2 October 1984 in Dresden)
- 2008/09: Marleen Herr (born 13 November 1985 in Dresden)
- 2009/10: Annegret Föllner (born 21 August 1985 in Magdeburg)
- 2010/11: Juliane Kremtz (born 1987 in Meißen)
- 2011/12: Franziska Spiegelberg (born 1991 in Dresden)
- 2012/13: Katja Riedel (from Pirna)
- 2013/14: Katharina Lai (born 1973) (Riesa/Glaubitz)
- 2014/15: Michaela Tutschke
- 2015/16: Daniela Undeutsch
- 2016/17: Friederike Wachtel (born 1989)

== Royal vineyard ==
The reigning Saxon Wine Queen owns her own vineyard: the vineyard, called the Rote Presse, is part of the Meißner Kapitelberg vineyard in the Spaargebirge hills, in the municipality of Oberspaar in the southeast of the borough of Meissen. Not far from the top of the Deutsche Bosel, a hill with a good viewing point, are the steep, terraced slopes of the vineyard, recognisable from afar from a little, yellow and ochre coloured vineyard house, the so-calles Swallow's Nest (Schwalbennest).

Some of the grapes harvested there are worked by the Saxon Wine Queen, who also uses it for representative purposes. Until 2011 the grape variety grown was a Riesling. On the occasion of the 850th anniversary of Saxon viticulture, the variety used for the 'royal' wine was changed to a Traminer, the oldest type of Saxon grape and one that is typical of Saxon wine growing.
