= Annika Strebel =

German Wine Queen 2011/2012

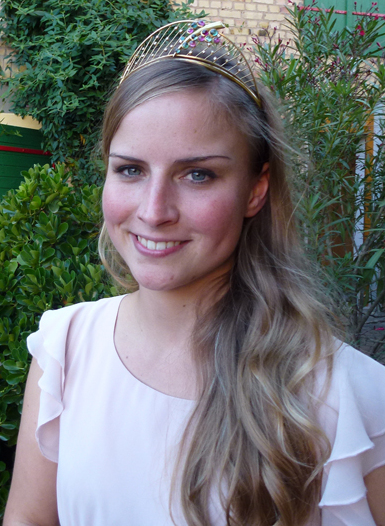
- Annika Strebel, the day after her election
- Born: 3 December 1987 (age 37); Worms, Germany
- Occupation: Vintner
- Known for: German Wine Queen 2011/2012

Annika Strebel (born 1987), from the German Rheinhessen wine region, was chosen as the 63rd German Wine Queen on 30 September 2011 in the town of Neustadt an der Weinstraße, as the successor to Mandy Großgarten from the Ahr wine region. The German Wine Princesses supporting her during her twelve-month reign were Elisabeth Born (Saale-Unstrut) and Ramona Sturm (Moselle).

== Family ==
Her father, Reimund Strebel, is a winemaking engineer at his own vineyard in Wintersheim, and her mother, Ingrid, is a domestic science teacher.

== Training ==
Strebel was born on 3 December 1987 in Worms and initially attended the Nikolaus Krämer primary school (1994–1998) and St Katherine's grammar school in Oppenheim (1998–2005). Thereafter, she successfully completed her training as a vintner in 2008 at the DLR Rheinhessen-Nahe-Hunsrück in Oppenheim. She worked at several well-known vineyards such as the Schales Vineyard in Flörsheim-Dalsheim, the Weingut Rappenhof in Alsheim and the Weingut Rebholz in Siebeldingen (Palatinate). In the years 2008 and 2009 she attended Bad Kreuznach Technical College. Subsequently, she studied viticulture and oenology at the RheinMain University of Applied Sciences, Geisenheim Department (see also →Geisenheim Grape Breeding Institute).

== Time as wine queen ==
From Sep 2010 to Sep 2011, Strebel was the Rheinhessen Wine Queen, before taking part in the German Wine Queen competition.

Preceded by Mandy Großgarten	German Wine Queen; 2011/2012	Succeeded by Julia Bertram
