= Temmels =

- Municipality
- Coat of arms

- Location of Temmels within Trier-Saarburg district
- Interactive map of Temmels
- Location within Germany Location within Rhineland-Palatinate
- Coordinates: 49°41′24″N 6°27′46″E
- Country: Germany
- State: Rhineland-Palatinate
- District: Trier-Saarburg
- Municipal assoc.: Konz

Government
  - Mayor (2019–24): Herbert Martin Schneider (SPD)

Area
  - Total: 6.62 km^{2} (2.56 sq mi)
- Elevation: 140 m (460 ft)

Population (2025-12-31)
  - Total: 773
  - Density: 117/km^{2} (302/sq mi)
- Time zone: UTC+01:00 (CET)
  - Summer (DST): UTC+02:00 (CEST)
- Postal codes: 54441
- Dialling codes: 06584
- Vehicle registration: TR
- Website: www.temmels.de

Temmels is a municipality in the Trier-Saarburg district, in Rhineland-Palatinate, Germany.

== Gallery ==
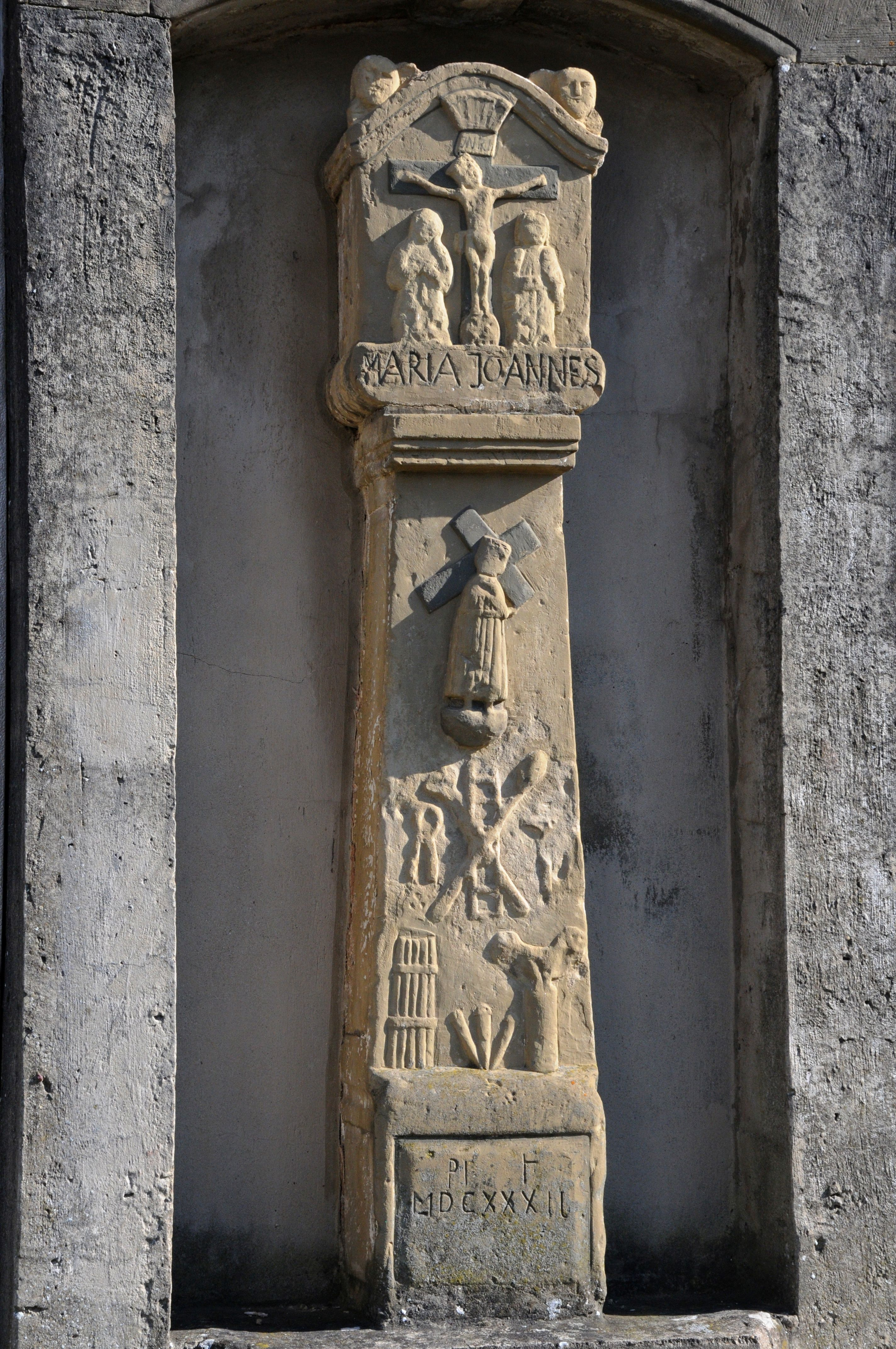
Piety column in Temmels

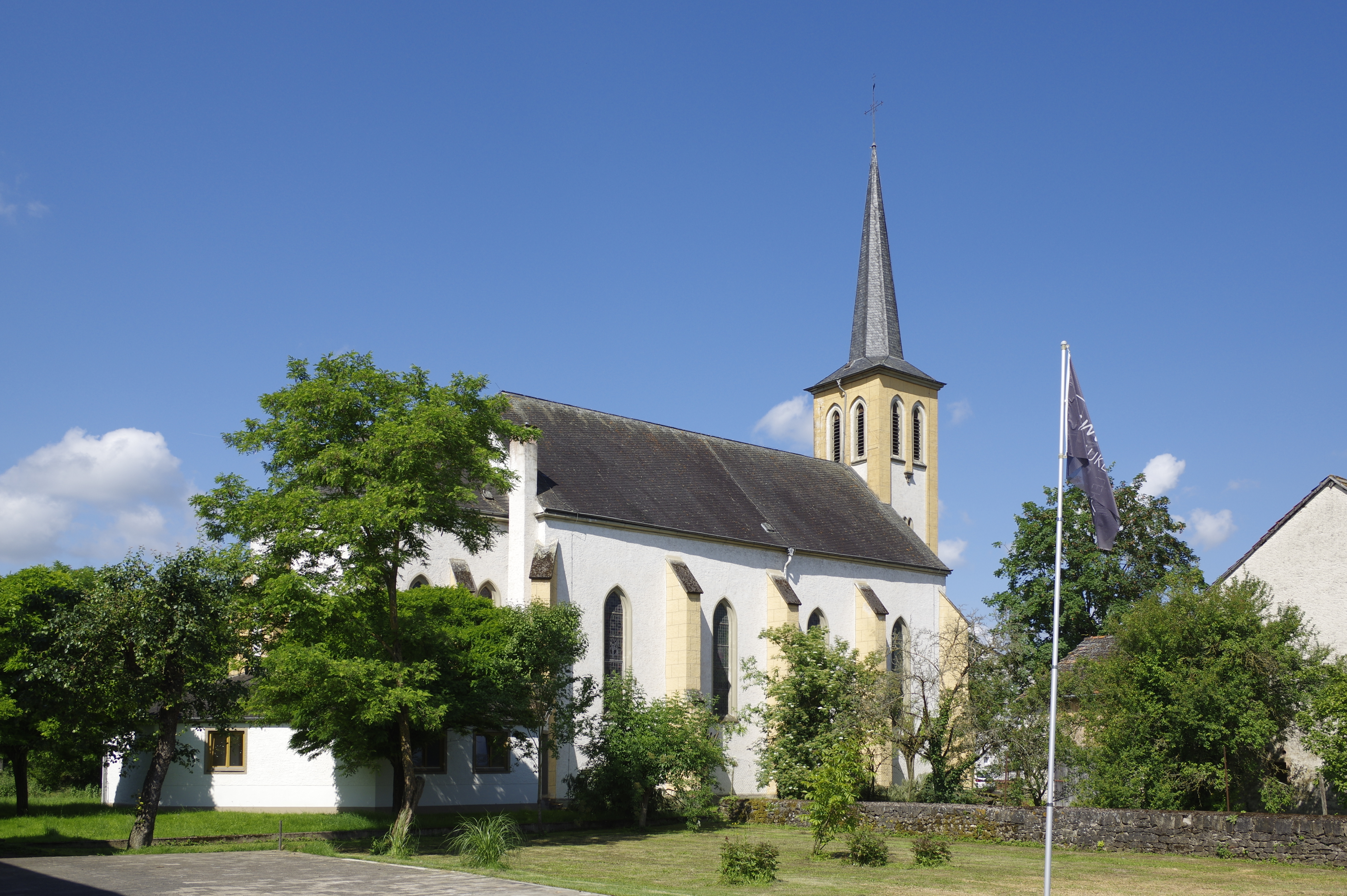
St. Peter in Temmels

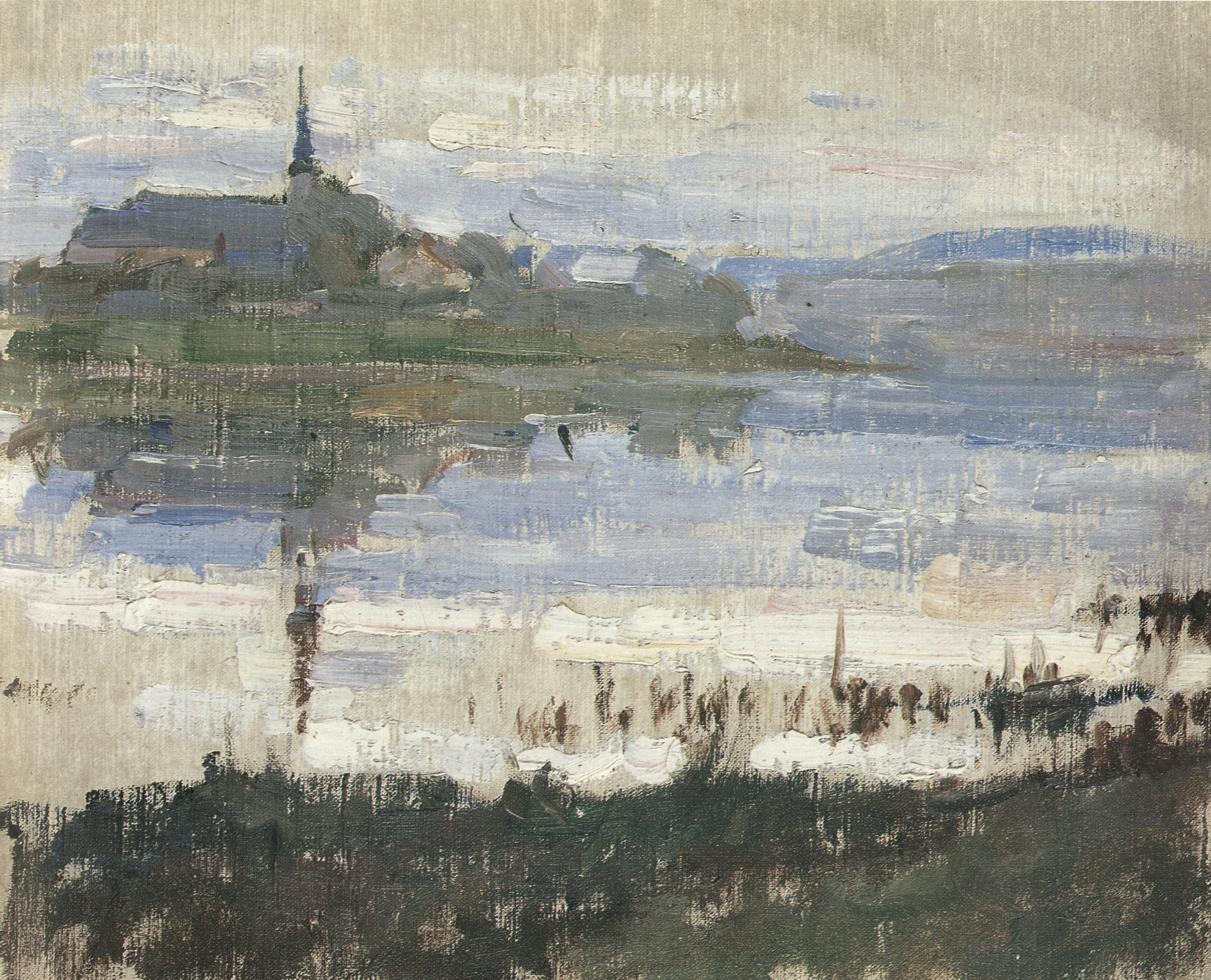
Temmels
by Jean-Pierre Beckius

== History ==
From 18 July 1946 to 6 June 1947 Temmels, in its then municipal boundary, formed part of the Saar Protectorate.
