= Mehring, Rhineland-Palatinate =

Mehring
- Municipality
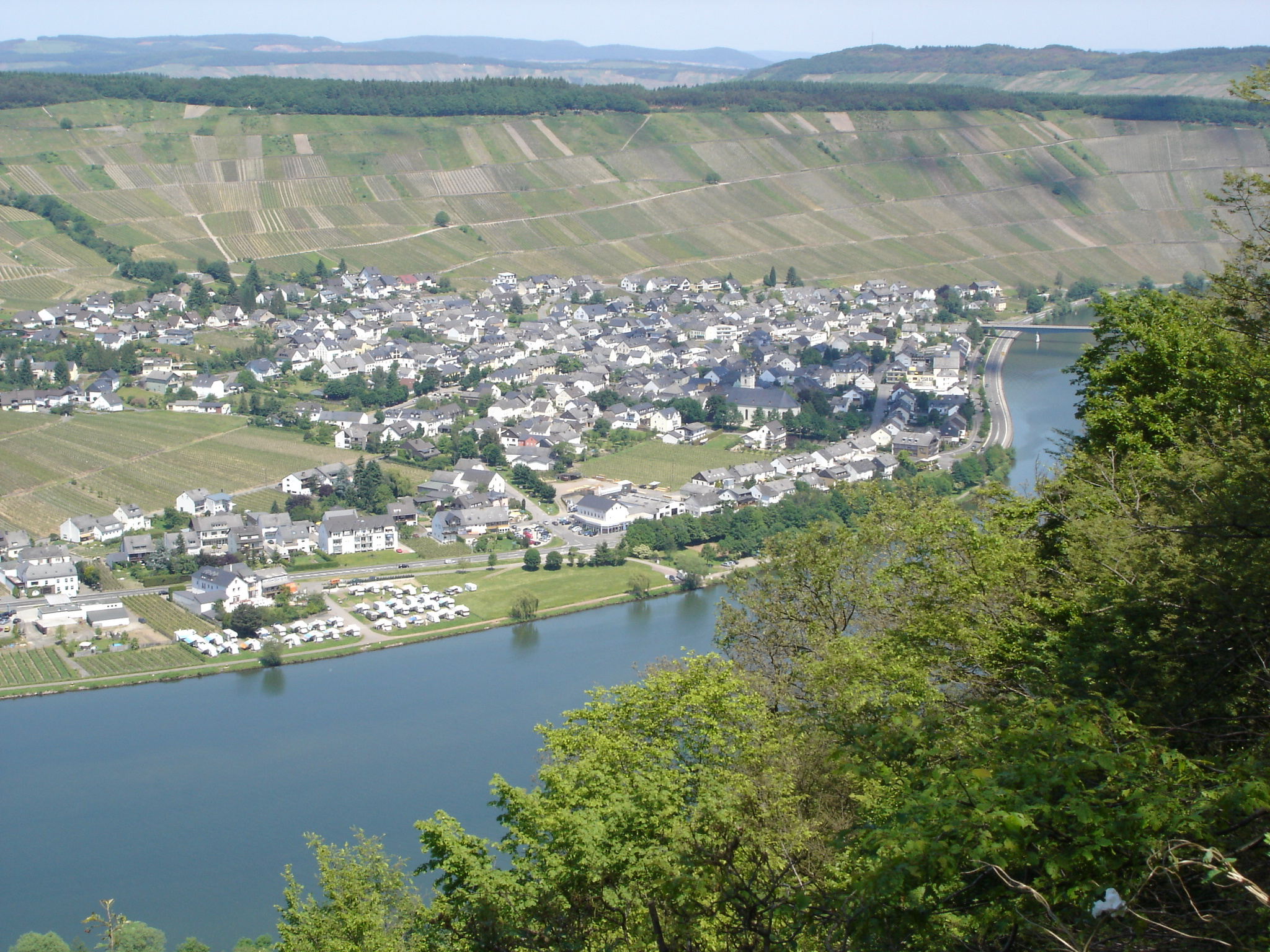

- Coat of arms

- Location of Mehring within Trier-Saarburg district
- Interactive map of Mehring
- Location within Germany Location within Rhineland-Palatinate
- Coordinates: 49°47′49″N 6°49′33″E
- Country: Germany
- State: Rhineland-Palatinate
- District: Trier-Saarburg
- Municipal assoc.: Schweich an der Römischen Weinstraße

Government
  - Mayor (2019–24): Jürgen Kollmann (CDU)

Area
  - Total: 22.3 km^{2} (8.6 sq mi)
- Elevation: 130 m (430 ft)

Population (2025-12-31)
  - Total: 2,351
  - Density: 105/km^{2} (273/sq mi)
- Time zone: UTC+01:00 (CET)
  - Summer (DST): UTC+02:00 (CEST)
- Postal codes: 54346
- Dialling codes: 06502
- Vehicle registration: TR
- Website: mehring.org

Mehring (German pronunciation: [ˈmeːʁɪŋ]) is a municipality in the Trier-Saarburg district of the Rhineland-Palatinate, Germany.
