= Oberfell =

- Municipality
- Coat of arms

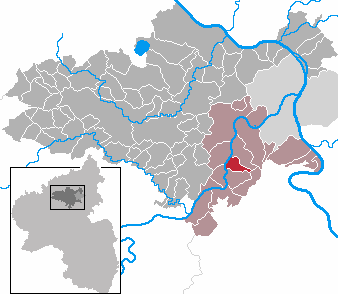
- Location of Oberfell within Mayen-Koblenz district
- Interactive map of Oberfell
- Location within Germany Location within Rhineland-Palatinate
- Coordinates: 50°15′39″N 7°26′51″E
- Country: Germany
- State: Rhineland-Palatinate
- District: Mayen-Koblenz
- Municipal assoc.: Rhein-Mosel

Government
  - Mayor (2019–24): Detlef Reil (CDU)

Area
  - Total: 5.57 km^{2} (2.15 sq mi)
- Elevation: 90 m (300 ft)

Population (2025-12-31)
  - Total: 1,139
  - Density: 204/km^{2} (530/sq mi)
- Time zone: UTC+01:00 (CET)
  - Summer (DST): UTC+02:00 (CEST)
- Postal codes: 56332
- Dialling codes: 02605
- Vehicle registration: MYK
- Website: www.oberfell.de

Oberfell is a municipality in the district of Mayen-Koblenz in Rhineland-Palatinate, western Germany.
