= German Wine Princess =

Deputies of the German Wine Queen

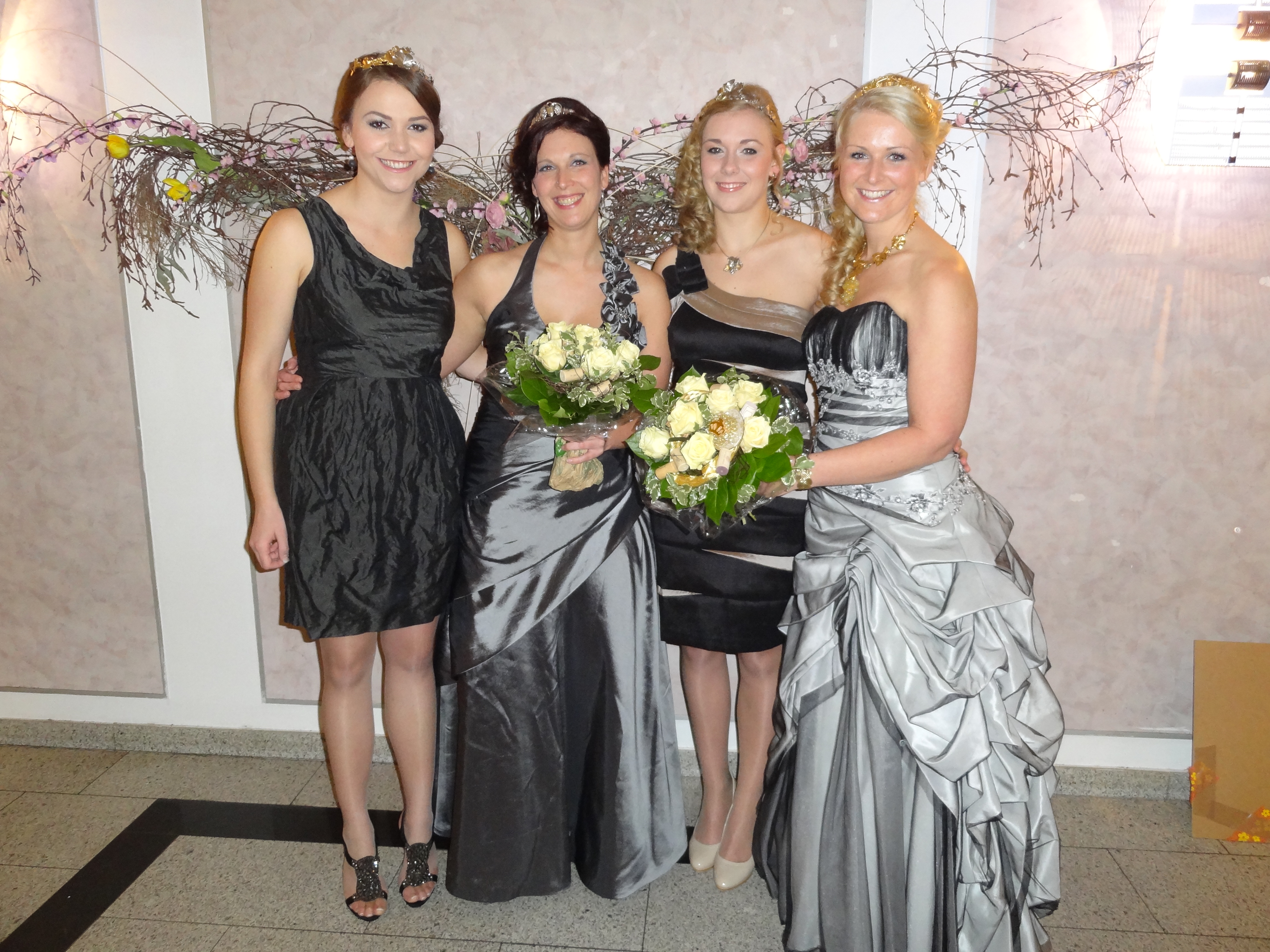
The 2013/2014 German Wine Princesses, Ramona Diegel from Rheinhessen (left) and Sabine Wagner from the Rheingau (2nd from right) at the competition for the Saxon Wine Queen in 2013 at the Coswig Börse. Also present are the 2012/13 Saxon Wine Queen, Katja Riedel (right), and 2012/13 Saxon Wine Princess, Christin Lustik, (2nd from left)

The German Wine Princesses (German: Deutschen Weinprinzessinnen) are the deputies of the German Wine Queen. Each year, up to three runners up in the German Wine Queen competition are awarded the title of "Wine Princess". Like the Wine Queen, they then become national and international representatives of the German wine industry under the direction of the German Wine Institute.

== German Wine Princesses ==
(list is complete from 1994/1995)

8. 1956/1957 Ursel Schwarzbeck from the Moselle
15. 1963/1964 Gerdi Sexauer, later Staiblin, from Baden
19. 1967/1968 Margot Leiser from Württemberg
20. 1968/1969 Marianne Menten, later Henrichs, from the Moselle, Christa Jung from the Palatinate
22. 1970/1971 Ingrid Näkel from the Ahr
23. 1971/1972 Reinhilde Rothbrust from the Moselle
31. 1979/1980 Rosemarie Blankenhorn from Baden
38. 1986/1987 Maria Bergold from the Palatinate
40. 1988/1989 Annette Borell from the Palatinate
41. 1989/1990 Hilke Dahlem from Rheinhessen, Astrid Forneck from the Middle Rhine, Margit Klein from the Nahe
42. 1990/1991 Antoinette Barth from the Nahe
44. 1992/1993 Bettina Fischer from the Moselle
45. 1993/1994 Anita Krämer from the Ahr
46. 1994/1995 Tanja Elflein from Franconia, Birgit Schneider from the Nahe
47. 1995/1996 Claudia Franconiaberger from Saale-Unstrut, Martina Nickenig from the Middle Rhine
48. 1996/1997 Gaby Hoffmann from the Moselle, Monika Metz from the Palatinate
49. 1997/1998 Sonja Freund, later Freund-Kuhmann, from the Palatinate, Birgit Zehe from Rheinhessen
50. 1998/1999 Michaela Heusinger from Franconia, Catharina Ries from the Rheingau
51. 1999/2000 Sabrina Koll from the Ahr, Sandra Polomski from Saale-Unstrut
52. 2000/2001 Wiebke Lawall from Rheinhessen, Salome Nies from the Rheingau
53. 2001/2002 Julia Hurst from Baden, Martina Klein from the Ahr, Christina Specht from the Middle Rhine
54. 2002/2003 Esther Knewitz from Rheinhessen, Friedrun Schwerdtle from Württemberg, Simone Wagner from the Rheingau
55. 2003/2004 Lisa Edling from the Bergstraße, Antje Wiedemann from Sachsen
56. 2004/2005 Nadine Jäger from the Rheingau, Tina Kiefer from the Palatinate
57. 2005/2006 Katharina Jost from the Middle Rhine, Nicole Kochan from the Moselle
58. 2006/2007 Barbara Fendel from the Middle Rhine, Sandra Soldmann from Saale-Unstrut
59. 2007/2008 Julia Metzler from Rheinhessen, Susanne Winterling from the Palatinate
60. 2008/2009 Sarah Schmitt from the Nahe, Andrea Köninger from Baden
61. 2009/2010 Christl Schäfer from Württemberg, Isabell Kindle from Baden
62. 2010/2011 Katja Bohnert from Baden, Melanie Unsleber from Franconia
63. 2011/2012 Elisabeth Born from Saale/Unstrut, Ramona Sturm from the Moselle
64. 2012/2013 Anna Hochdörffer from the Palatinate, Natalie Henninger from Baden
65. 2013/2014 Ramona Diegel from Rheinhessen, Sabine Wagner from the Rheingau
66. 2014/2015 Judith Dorst from Rheinhessen, Kathrin Schnitzius from the Moselle
67. 2015/2016 Katharina Fladung from the Rheingau, Caroline Guthier from the Bergstraße
68. 2016/2017 Christina Schneider from Nordheim in Franken, Mara Walz from Ensingen in Württemberg
69. 2017/2018 Laura Lahm from Rheinhessen, Charlotte Freiberger from the Bergstraße
70. 2018/2019 Inga Storck from Einselthum in the Palatinate, Klara Zehnder from Randersacker in Franken
