= Ruwer (wine region) =

Wine-growing district in Germany

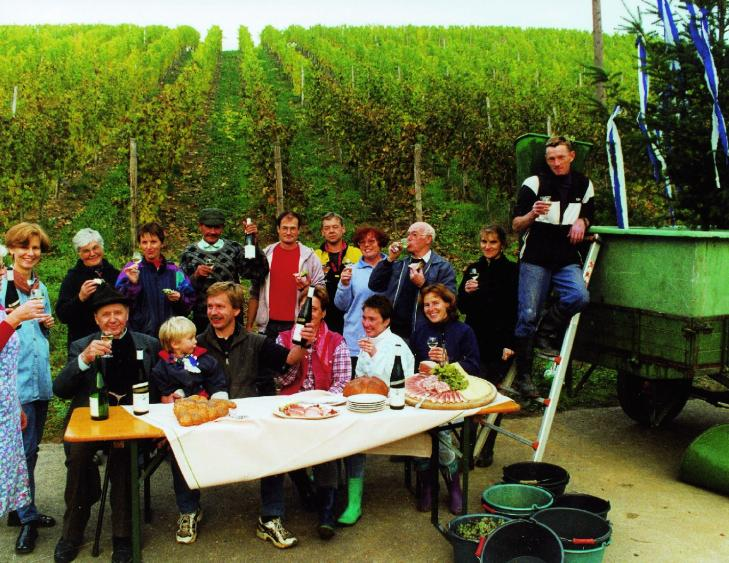
Ruwer valley

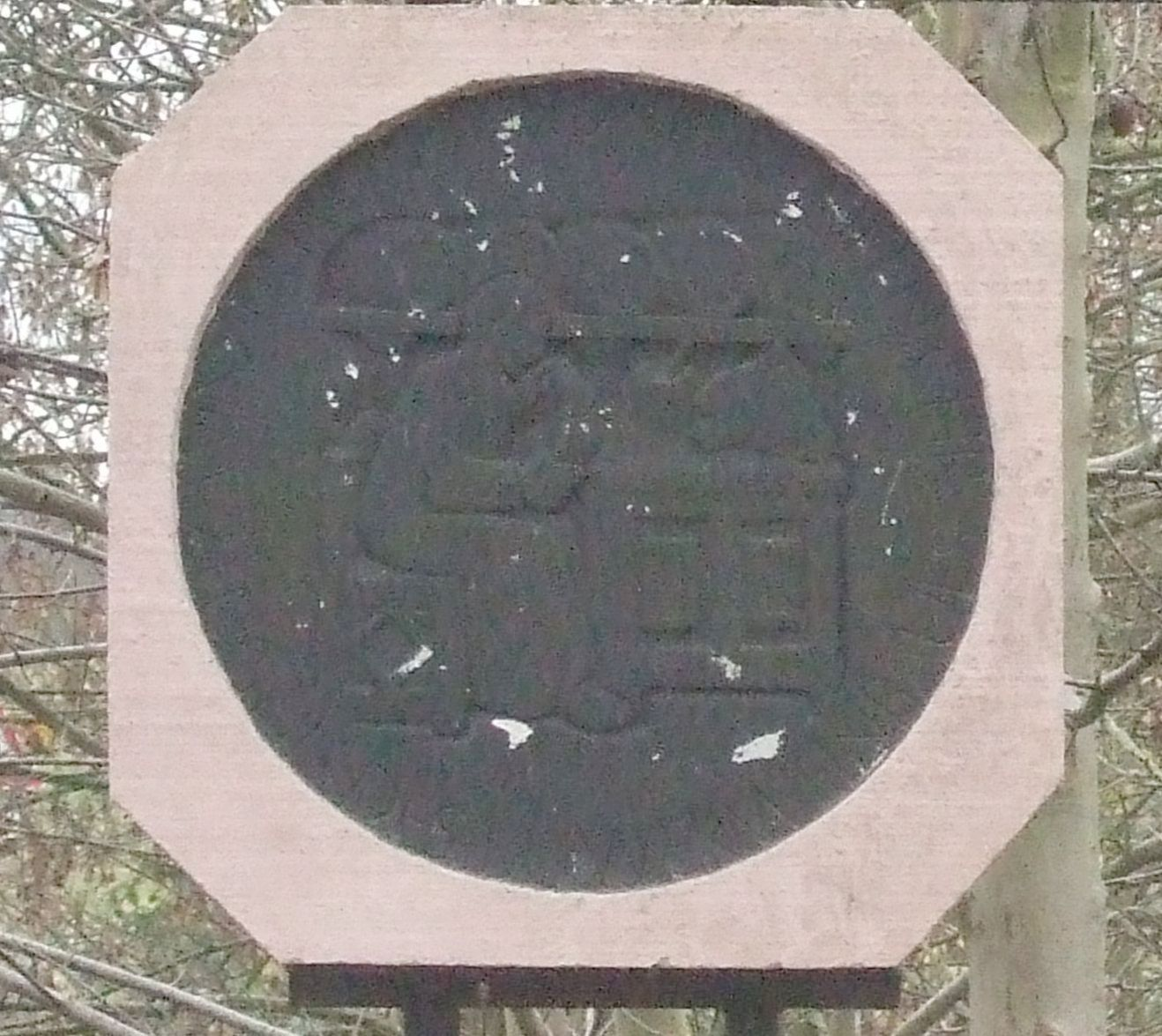
Roman relief: Vintner in his office

Ruwer or Ruwerthal is a wine-growing district (Bereich) at the Ruwer (river) near Trier, Germany. It is a district of the Mosel region, which used to be called Mosel-Saar-Ruwer.

The Romans produced wine in the Ruwer region since the 2nd century.

== Villages and vineyards ==
- Ruwer/Eitelsbach: Karthäuserhofberg, Sonnenberg, Marienholz, Maximiner, Domherrenberg.
- Mertesdorf: Maximin Grünhaus: Bruderberg, Abtsberg, Herrenberg; Lorenzhöfer Mäuerchen, Lorenzhöfer Felslay, Johannisberg, Herrenberg;
- Kasel: Herrenberg, Dominikanerberg, Kehrnagel, Hitzlay, Nieschen, Paulinsberg, Timpert.
- Waldrach: Heiligenhäuschen, Hubertusberg, Sonnenberg, Jungfernberg, Krone, Laurentiusberg, Ehrenberg, Doktorberg, Meisenberg, Jesuitengarten, Kurfürstenberg.
- Morscheid: Heiligenhäuschen, Dominikanerberg.
- Riveris: Kuhnchen, Heiligenhäuschen.
- Sommerau: Schlossberg
- Korlingen: Leikaul
