= Ruwer-Hochwald-Radweg =

Cyclable trail in Rhineland-Palatinate, Germany

Coordinates: 49.7828°N 6.7079°E

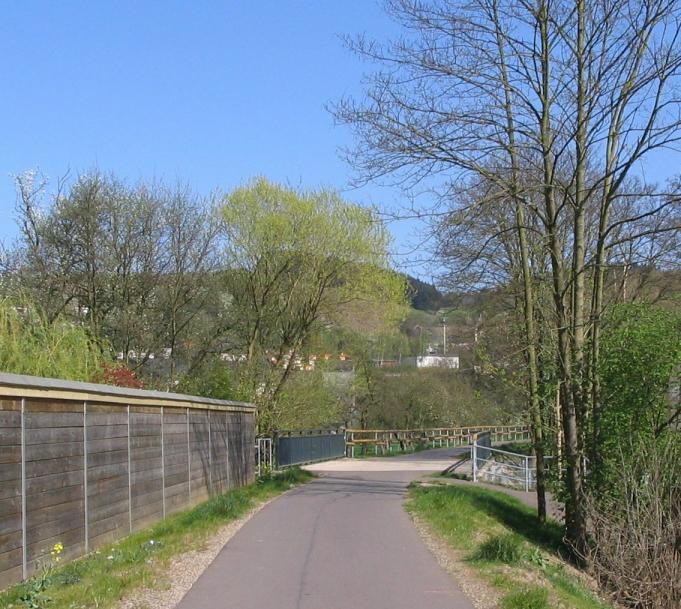
Bicycle way in Ruwer

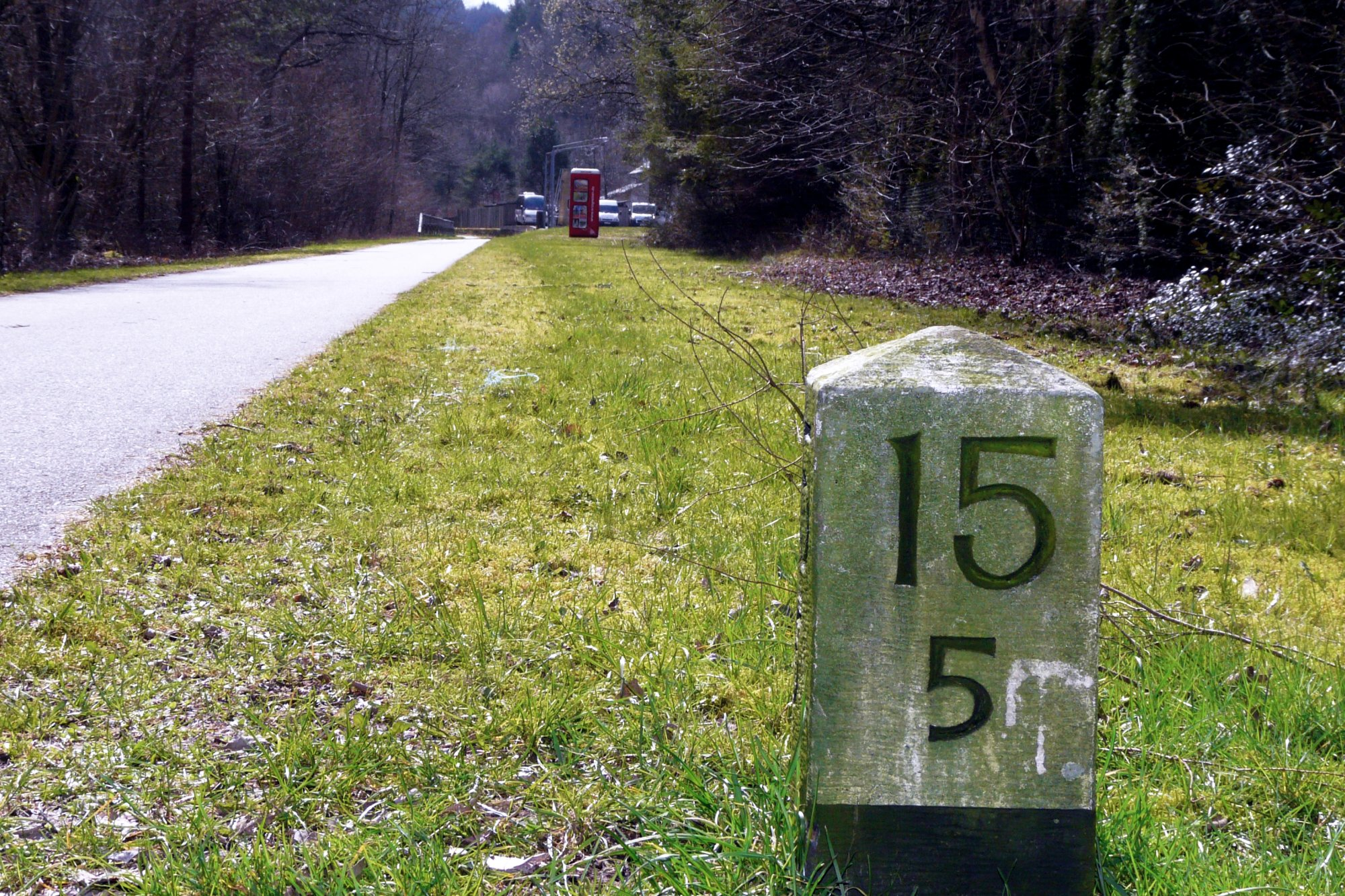
Remains of the railway: milestone on the side of the bicycle way near Pluwig

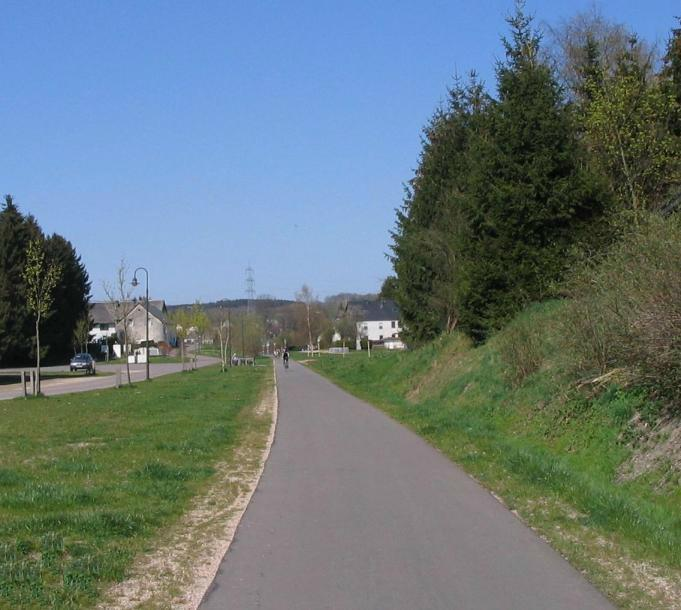
Bicycle way in Reinsfeld

The Ruwer-Hochwald-Radweg is a cyclable trail. It is for bicycles. It links the Moselle-valley and the Hunsrück from Trier to Hermeskeil in Rhineland-Palatinate, Germany. The length is about 48 km:

- Trier-Ruwer - Mertesdorf - Kasel - Waldrach: 5,8 km
- Waldrach - Sommerau - Gusterath-Tal - Pluwigerhammer: 7,7 km
- Pluwigerhammer - Hinzenburg - Burg Heid: 6,0 km
- Burg Heid - Hentern - Zerf: 5,6 km
- Zerf - Niederkell: 5,4 km
- Niederkell - Kell am See: 4,0 km
- Kell am See - Reinsfeld: 7,0 km
- Reinsfeld - Hermeskeil: 6,3 km
