= Gusterath =

- Municipality
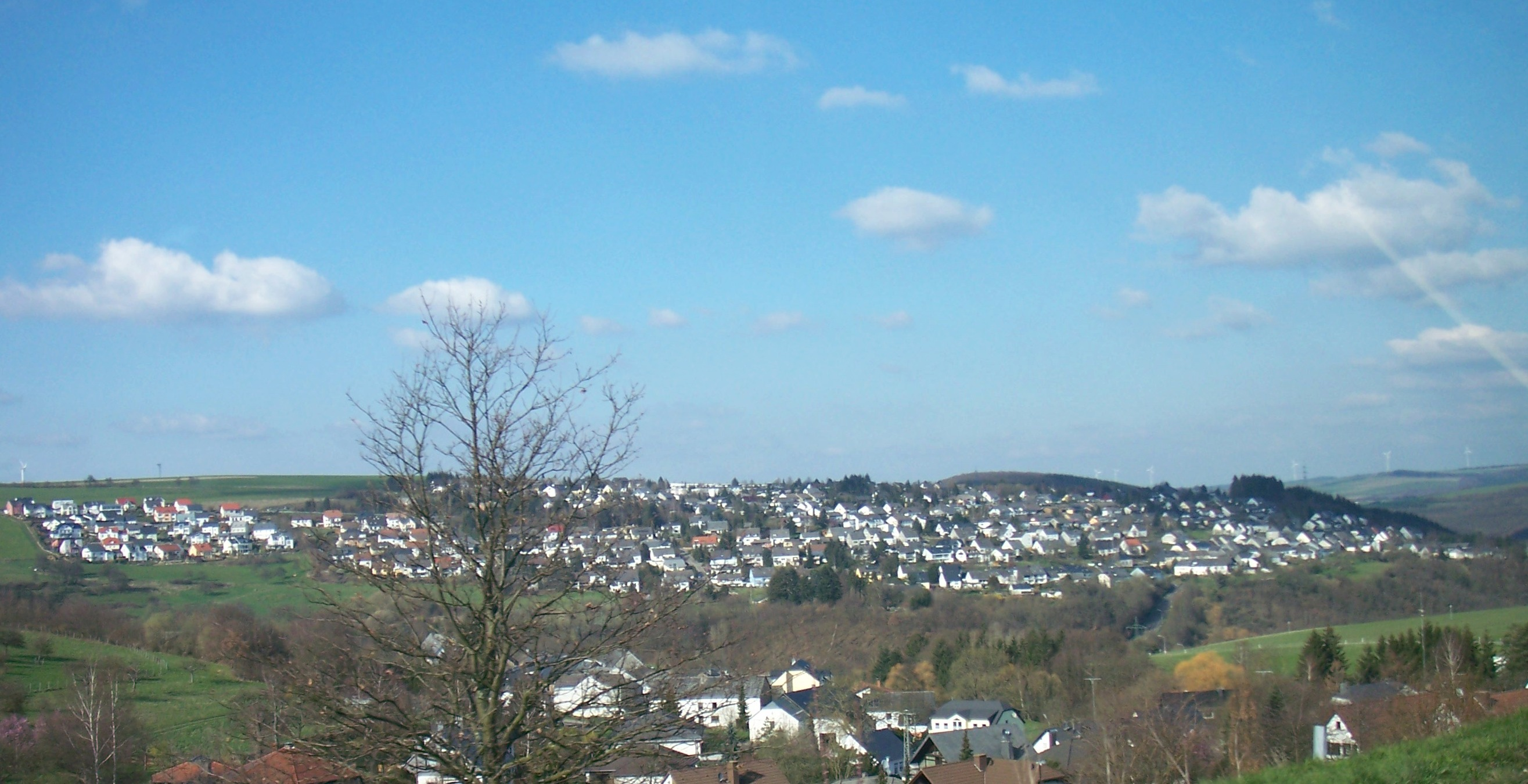

- Coat of arms

- Location of Gusterath within Trier-Saarburg district
- Interactive map of Gusterath
- Location within Germany Location within Rhineland-Palatinate
- Coordinates: 49°42′3″N 6°43′2″E
- Country: Germany
- State: Rhineland-Palatinate
- District: Trier-Saarburg
- Municipal assoc.: Ruwer

Area
  - Total: 4.41 km^{2} (1.70 sq mi)
- Elevation: 261 m (856 ft)

Population (2025-12-31)
  - Total: 1,901
  - Density: 431/km^{2} (1,120/sq mi)
- Time zone: UTC+01:00 (CET)
  - Summer (DST): UTC+02:00 (CEST)
- Postal codes: 54317
- Dialling codes: 06588
- Vehicle registration: TR
- Website: www.gusterath.de

Gusterath is a municipality in the Trier-Saarburg district, in Rhineland-Palatinate, Germany. It belongs to the Verbandsgemeinde Ruwer.

== Geography ==
Gusterath is located in the Ruwer valley close to Trier. To the north, the closest villages are Korlingen and Gutweiler. Due east is Lonzenburg, itself a part of Schöndorf. Pluwig is to the south and Hockweiler to the west. The closest part of Trier to Gusterath is Irsch.

== History ==
In the era of Ancient Rome, several small farms existed in the area of modern Gusterath.

== Politics ==
=== Local mayor ===
- 1987–2009: Günter Scherer, SPD
- 2009–2019: Alfred Bläser, FWG
- since 2019: Stefan Metzdorf, SPD
