= Ruwer (disambiguation) =

The Ruwer is a river in Germany.

Ruwer can also refer to:

- Ruwer (municipality), a convention community (Verbandsgemeinde) in Rhineland-Palatinate, Germany
- Ruwer/Eitelsbach, a suburban part of Trier, Germany
- Ruwer (wine region), formally Ruwertal, a subordinate region of the German wine-growing region Mosel, which was formerly known as Mosel-Saar-Ruwer
