= BBk II =

Cold War German banknote series

The BBk II was a secret series of emergency banknotes produced by the Deutsche Bundesbank during the Cold War. Commissioned as a contingency reserve against large-scale counterfeiting or economic destabilization of the Deutsche Mark, the notes were never circulated. They were destroyed in 1988–1989, and only a small number of surviving examples are believed to exist.

== Background ==
Planning for a reserve banknote series began in 1959, when an internal Bundesbank memorandum noted that several central banks maintained reserve printing plates for use "in all eventualities". The program was formally commissioned on 1 July 1960.

The primary threat identified was that Eastern Bloc states might flood West Germany with counterfeit money, causing hyperinflation and undermining public confidence in the currency and economy. The strategy of destabilizing an enemy economy through counterfeiting was not without historical precedent: during World War II, Nazi Germany had conducted Operation Bernhard, in which concentration camp prisoners were forced to produce counterfeit British pounds intended to undermine the British economy. The strategy was also associated with a maxim attributed to Vladimir Lenin: "whoever wants to destroy a society must ruin its currency."

Economic historian Carl-Ludwig Holtfrerich considered large-scale criminal counterfeiting an implausible trigger, given the existing security features of the Deutsche Mark, and assessed an Eastern Bloc military or economic attack as the more likely scenario the program was designed to address. A further scenario was that the notes would be needed to replace currency physically destroyed in a nuclear strike.

== Design and production ==
=== Western Germany series ===
The BBk II notes were produced between 1963 and 1974 by the Bundesdruckerei and Giesecke & Devrient, the two German banknote printing works, after designs by the Frankfurt graphic artist Max Bittrof. Bittrof had been one of the unsuccessful entrants in the design competition for the regular circulating series (BBk I), and the reverse sides of the replacement notes were required to follow the ornamental style of his BBk I submission for the 50-mark note. The 20-mark and 100-mark notes were printed by the Bundesdruckerei; the 10-mark and 50-mark notes were printed by Giesecke & Devrient.

The series comprised denominations of 10, 20, 50, and 100 Deutsche Mark. The notes closely resembled the regular BBk I series in size, colour, and the portrait subjects on their obverse sides. The 20-mark note featured the patrician Elsbeth Tucher (1473–1517), subject of a portrait by Albrecht Dürer; the 100-mark note featured the cosmographer Sebastian Münster, as in the circulating series. The reverse sides were entirely different: instead of architectural landmarks such as the Holstentor on the 50-mark note, or the Federal Eagle on the 100-mark note, the BBk II notes bore only abstract, curved graphic patterns.

The Bundesbank's own monthly report of November 1962 had briefly disclosed the existence of the replacement series publicly, describing it as a "shortened replacement series" limited to the four most important denominations — though this attracted little attention at the time. Full details remained subject to a 30-year confidentiality period, which expired in 2010.

=== West Berlin series ===
A separate emergency currency was produced for West Berlin by Rudolf Gerhardt, a graphic artist employed at the Bundesdruckerei, where it was also printed exclusively. Unlike the western Germany series, the West Berlin series included an additional 5 DM denomination, though like the western Germany series it lacked the two largest denominations of 500 and 1,000 DM. With a total face value of approximately 3.99 billion Deutsche Marks, it was stored at the former Landeszentralbank in West Berlin until its destruction.

The reasons for commissioning a distinct series for the city have never been established; Dr. Reinhold Walburg of the Bundesbank, the principal researcher on the subject, found no surviving documentation explaining the decision. Economic historian Holtfrerich offered a tentative explanation: in the event of nuclear war, neither side would have bombed Berlin directly, leaving it relatively intact while West Germany was devastated; a separate local currency may have been intended to prevent desperate mainland demand from depleting Berlin's supplies.

Across both series, just under 785 million banknotes were printed, with a combined face value of approximately 29 billion Deutsche Marks.

== Storage ==
The majority of the western Germany reserve — nearly 14.5 billion Deutsche Marks in face value, held in 18,354 boxes each containing 20,000 banknotes — was stored in the Bundesbank bunker, a secret underground facility near Cochem in Rhineland-Palatinate. The operation remained classified throughout the Cold War — reportedly unknown even to the East German Stasi. An additional approximately 11 billion Deutsche Marks was held in the vaults of the Bundesbank's main headquarters in Frankfurt am Main, bringing the western Germany reserve to approximately 25.278 billion Deutsche Marks in total — roughly equal to the entire volume of cash in circulation in the German economy in 1963.

== Planned deployment ==
Had the reserve been activated, citizens would have had 14 days to exchange their existing banknotes before the old notes lost legal validity, with exchanges conducted at banks and savings banks throughout the country. Replacement notes would have been transported from Cochem and Frankfurt to regional central banks for onward distribution to financial institutions.

== Destruction ==
In 1988, before the fall of the Berlin Wall, a decision was taken to destroy the entire reserve. Two factors drove the decision: the imminent introduction from 1990 of a new Deutsche Mark series (BBk III) incorporating more advanced counterfeit-resistant security features, and a reduced perceived need for large physical cash reserves as electronic payment transactions became more widespread. The notes were removed by lorry and destroyed by specialist contractors; by early 1989 the destruction was complete.

== Surviving notes ==
Despite the systematic destruction of the reserve, a small number of notes are believed to have escaped — either through mechanical failure during shredding or because individual boxes were inadvertently unsealed. Dr. Walburg estimated that approximately five to ten BBk II notes remain in existence. When examples appear at auction, the Bundesbank moves to confiscate them, a practice that has contributed to their status as sought-after collectors' items.

== Research ==
The principal scholarly account of the BBk II program is the paper "'für alle Fälle' – Die geheimnisvollen Banknoten aus der Zeit der deutschen Mark" ("'For all eventualities' – The mysterious banknotes from the era of the Deutsche Mark") by Dr. Reinhold Walburg, head of the Bundesbank's coin and banknote collection, who reviewed thousands of documents to compile the factual record of the series.

== See also ==
- Deutsche Mark
- Deutsche Bundesbank
- Bundesbank bunker
- Operation Bernhard
- Cold War
- West Berlin
