= Schöndorf =

Schöndorf may refer to the following places in Germany:

- Schöndorf, Rhineland-Palatinate, in the Trier-Saarburg district, Rhineland-Palatinate
- Schöndorf, Thuringia, in the Saale-Orla-Kreis, Thuringia
- a part of Waldfeucht, North Rhine-Westphalia
- a part of Weimar, Thuringia

and to:

- Schöndorf, the German name for Frumușeni Commune, Arad County, Romania
