= Ruwer (Verbandsgemeinde) =

- Verbandsgemeinde
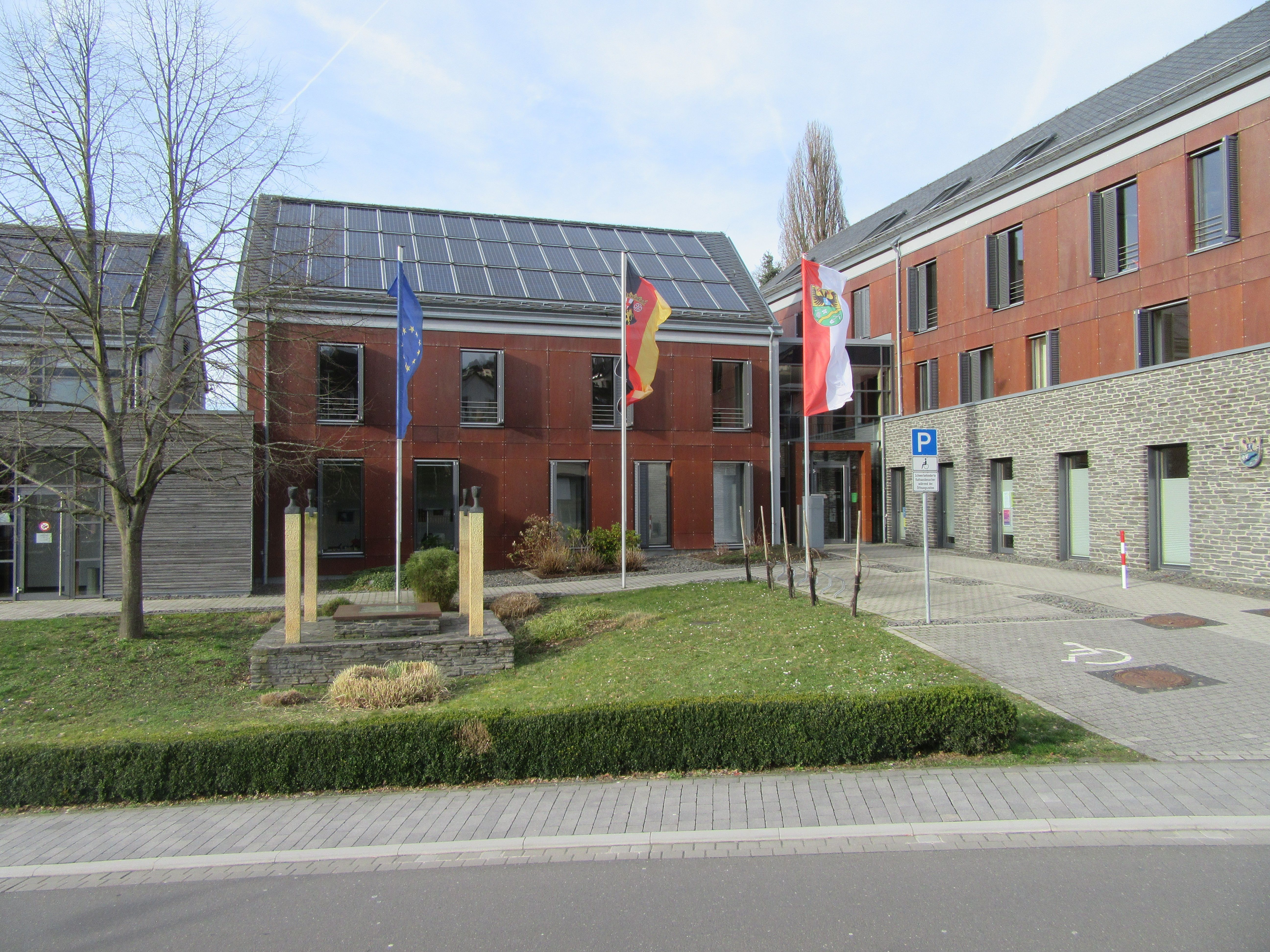
- Rathaus Waldrach

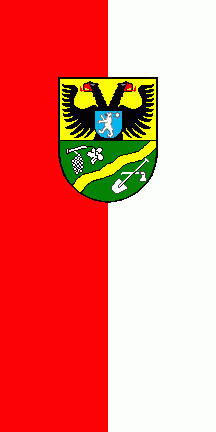
- Flag Coat of arms

- Location of Ruwer (Verbandsgemeinde) in the district
- Interactive map of Ruwer
- Location within Germany Location within Rhineland-Palatinate
- Coordinates: 49°44′44″N 6°44′41″E
- Country: Germany
- State: Rhineland-Palatinate
- District: Trier-Saarburg
- Founded: October 1, 1968
- Subdivisions: 20 municipalities

Government
  - Mayor (2017–25): Stephanie Nickels (CDU)

Area
  - Total: 126.6 km^{2} (48.9 sq mi)

Population (2025-12-31)
  - Total: 18,185
  - Density: 143.6/km^{2} (372.0/sq mi)
- Time zone: UTC+01:00 (CET)
  - Summer (DST): UTC+02:00 (CEST)
- Vehicle registration: TR, SAB
- Website: www.ruwer.de

Ruwer is a Verbandsgemeinde (collective municipality) with 18,171 inhabitants (as at Dec 2015) on the river Ruwer near Trier in Rhineland-Palatinate, Germany. It is famous for the wine from the Moselle wine-growing region, which used to be called Moselle-Saar-Ruwer, and which was founded by the Romans. The administrative seat used to be located in Ruwer, which was an independent municipality until it was incorporated into the city of Trier. The seat has been located in Waldrach since November 2005.

Ruwer consists of the following 20 Ortsgemeinden ("local municipalities"):

Name	Area (km²)	1563 (Fireplaces)	1684 (Fireplaces)	1818 (Population)	2000 (Population)	2015 (Population)
Bonerath	4.25	6	6	151	256	245
Farschweiler	7.45	13	8	197	760	784
Gusterath	4.41	5	9	141	2,015	1,891
Gutweiler	2.51	7	7	100	739	648
Herl	2.83	5	7	140	254	268
Hinzenburg	2.87	3	3	82	164	142
Holzerath	6.76	6	5	186	498	429
Kasel	4.53	25	21	255	1,347	1,312
Korlingen	2.08	9	6	97	890	771
Lorscheid	5.09	11	12	187	621	568
Mertesdorf	6.47	20	14	287	1,762	1,650
Morscheid	5.48	17	18	227	821	954
Ollmuth	3.93	4	4	91	174	160
Osburg	33.92	23	17	515	1,943	2,457
Pluwig	4.87	9	9	250	1,231	1,600
Riveris	2.11	4	4	133	364	408
Schöndorf	10.03	12	12	296	831	734
Sommerau	1.04	1	1	29	74	73
Thomm	4.49	16	12	327	1,041	1,050
Waldrach	12.45	53	41	533	2,179	2,027
Σ Ruwer (Verbandsgemeinde)	127.57	249	216	4,224	17,964	18,171

The Verbandsgemeinde Ruwer is a part of the district Trier-Saarburg.

== Gallery ==
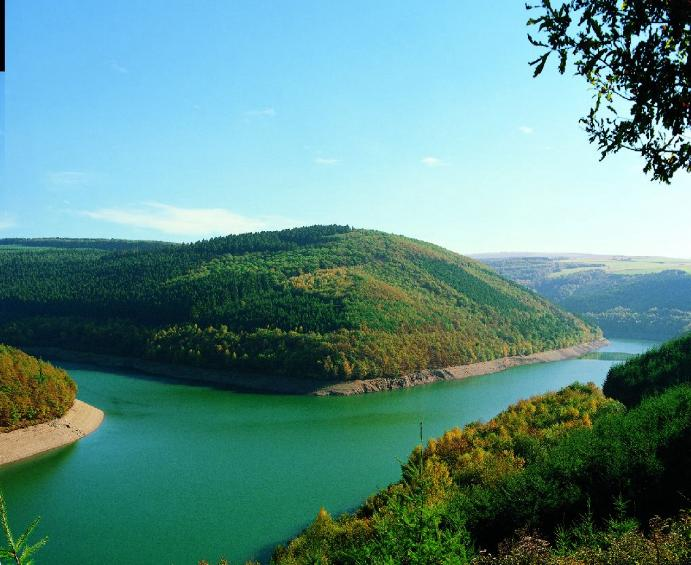
Riveristalsperre

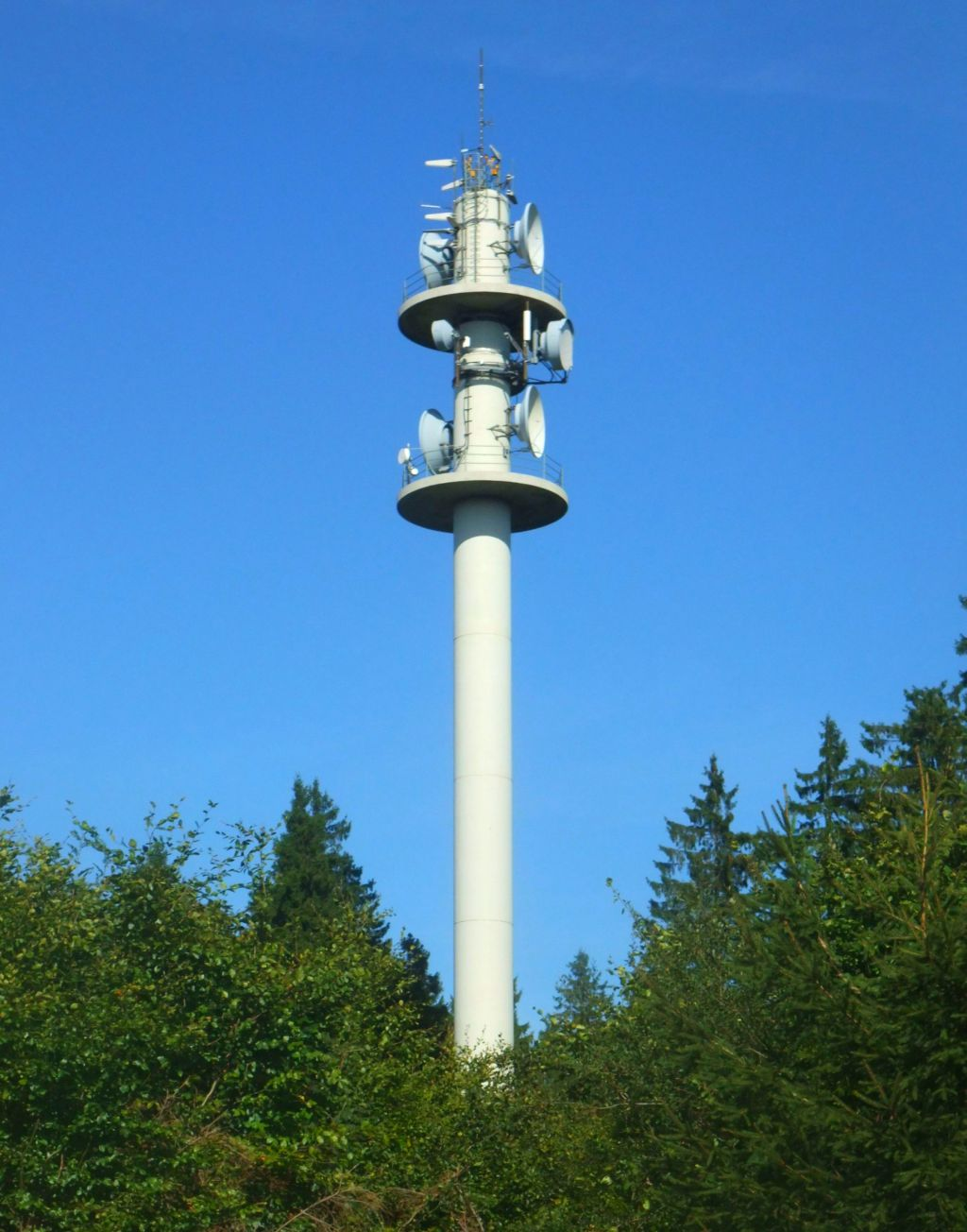
Rösterkopf

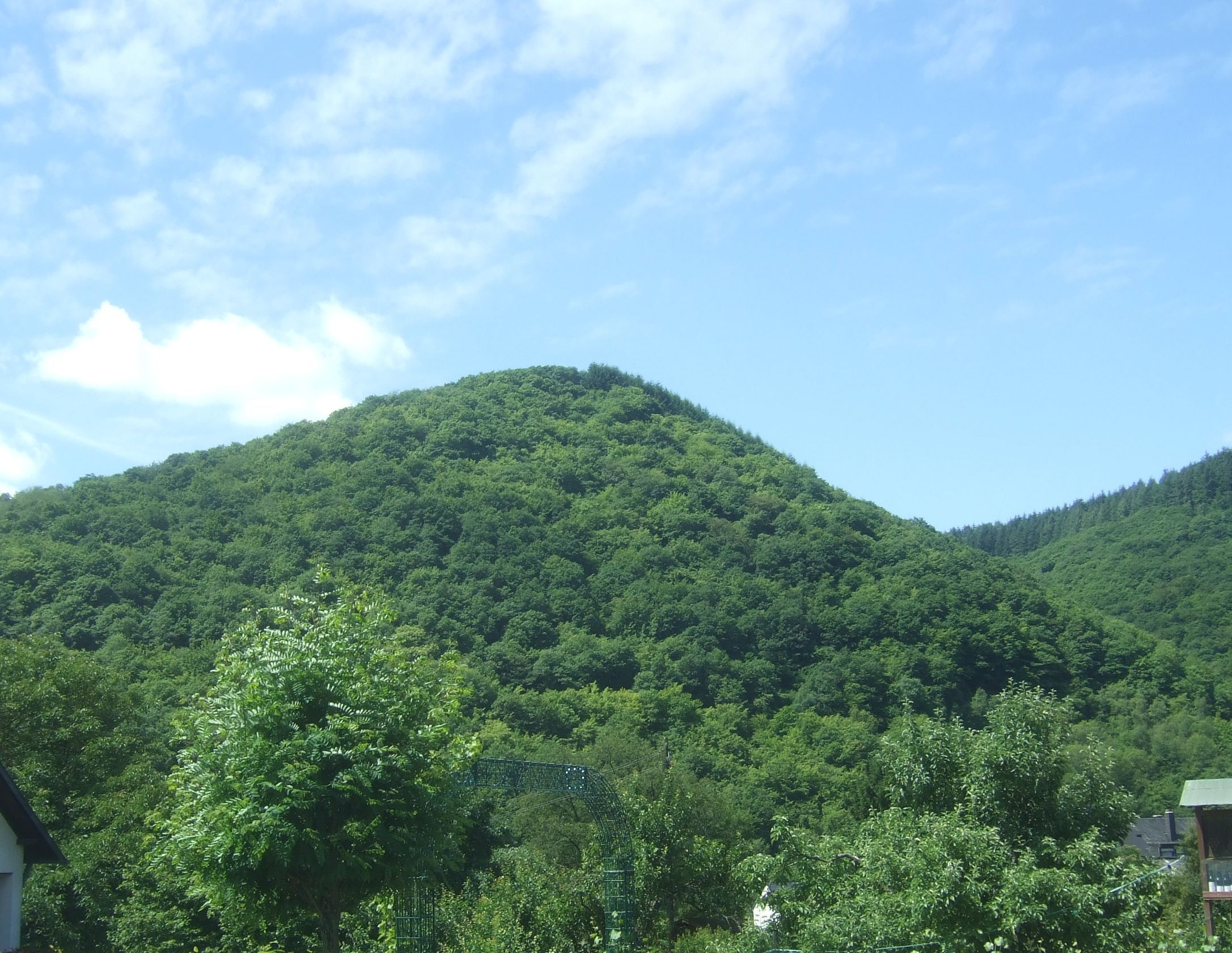
Naumeter Kupp

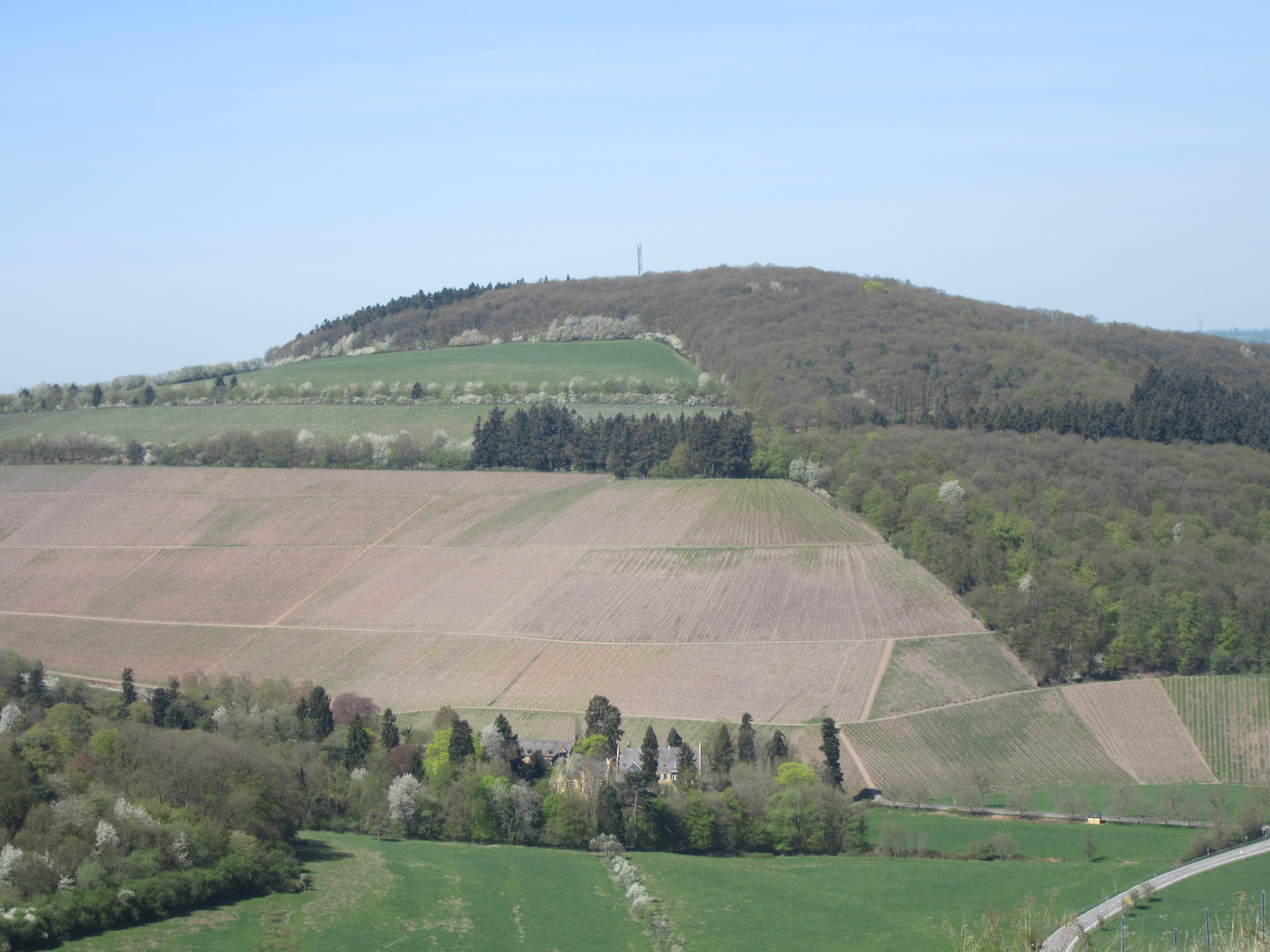
Grüneberg

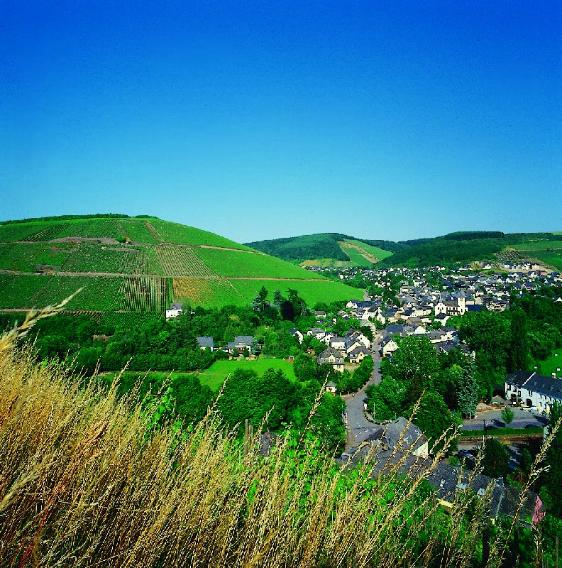
Kaseler Nieschen

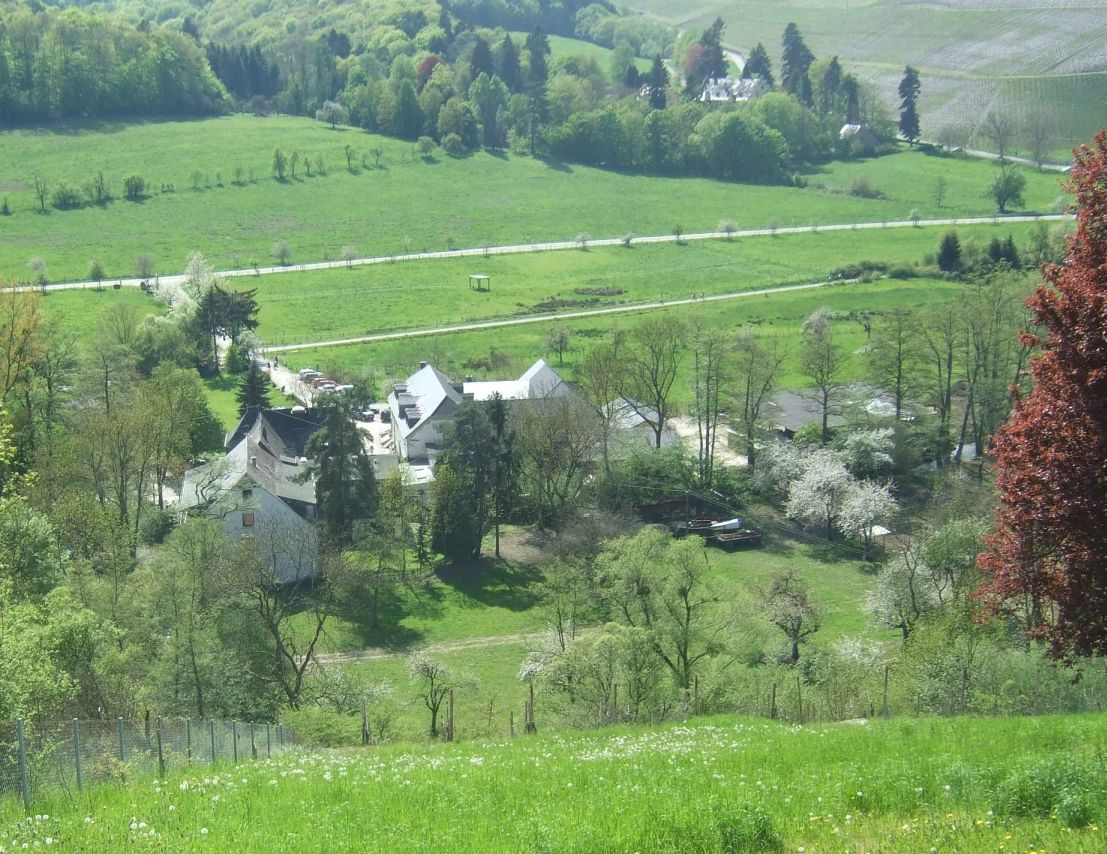
Karlsmühle

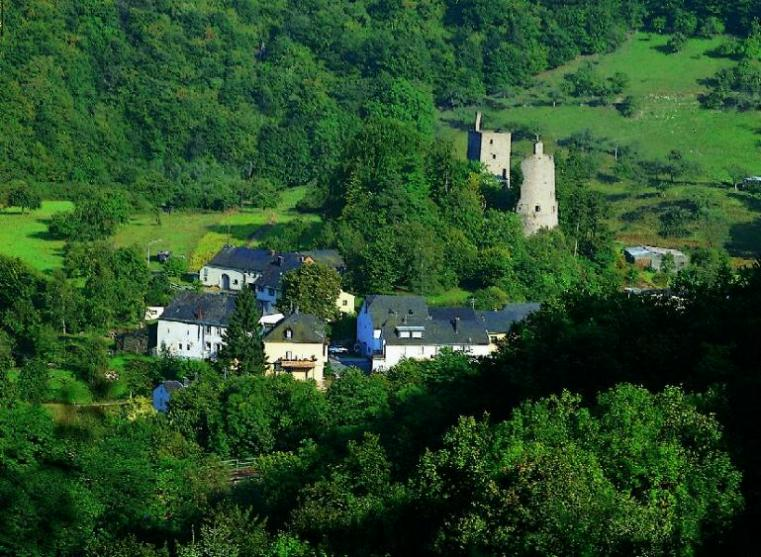
Burgruine Sommerau

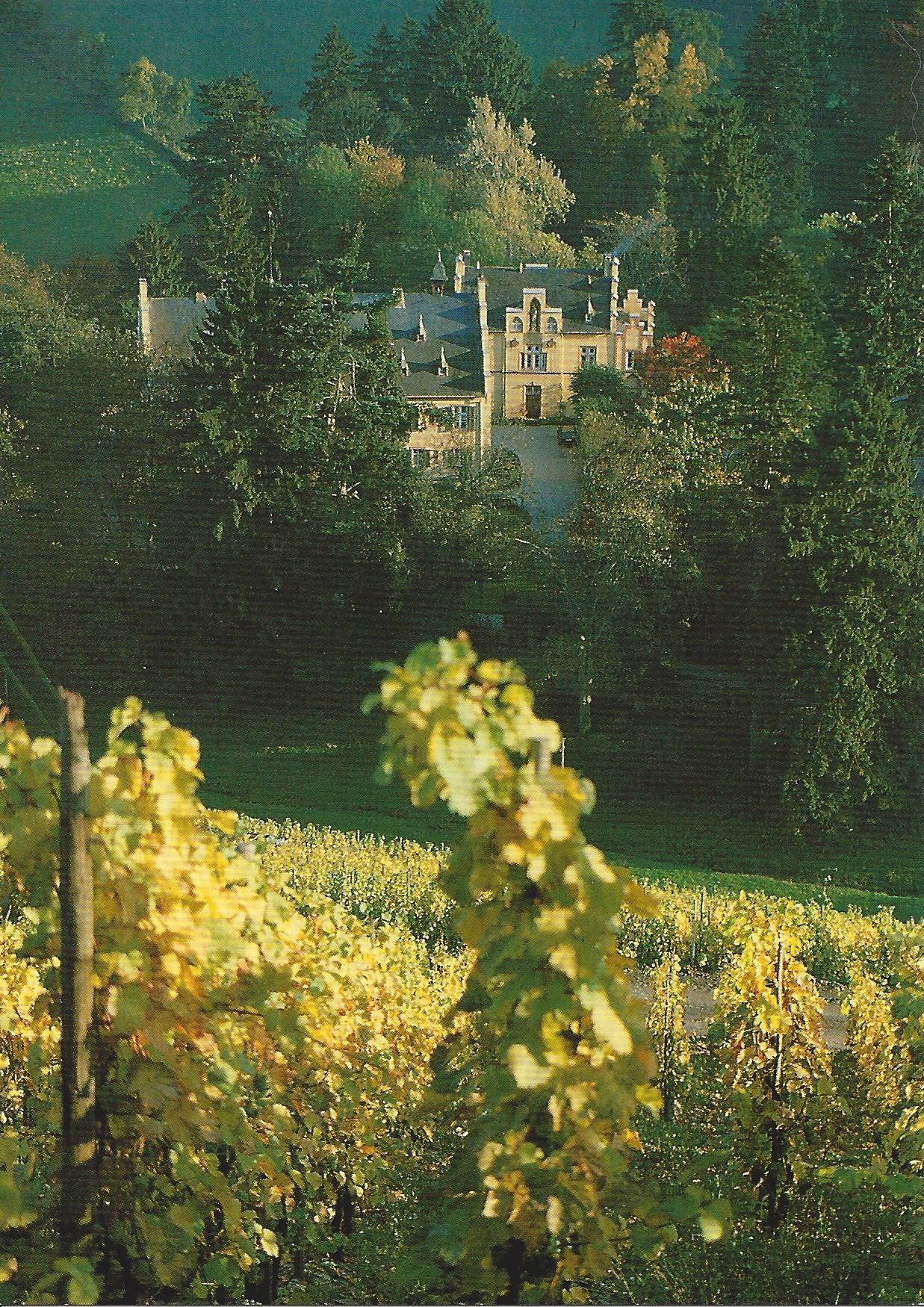
Schloss Grünhaus

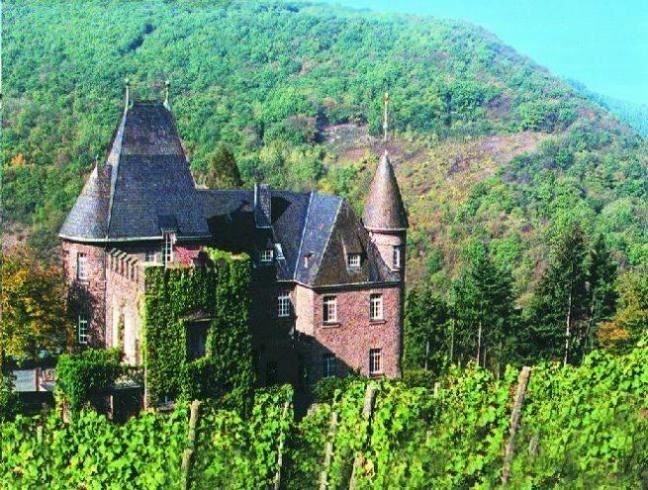
Schloss Marienlay

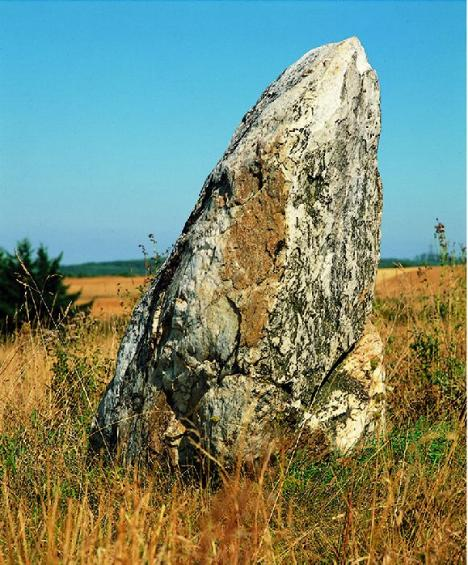
Menhir

== See also ==
- Ruwer-Hochwald-Radweg
