= Holzerath =

- Municipality
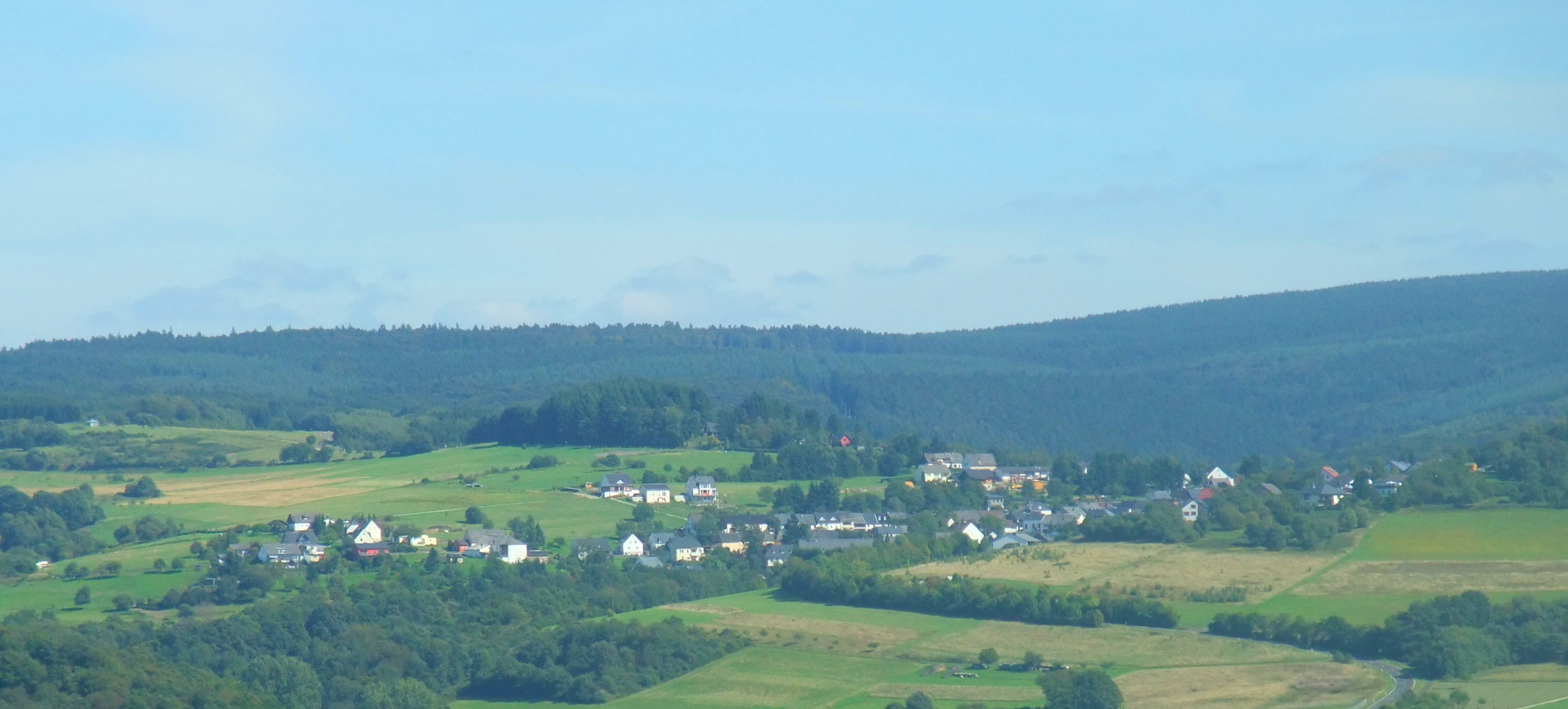

- Coat of arms

- Location of Holzerath within Trier-Saarburg district
- Interactive map of Holzerath
- Location within Germany Location within Rhineland-Palatinate
- Coordinates: 49°40′47.13″N 6°45′35.99″E
- Country: Germany
- State: Rhineland-Palatinate
- District: Trier-Saarburg
- Municipal assoc.: Ruwer

Government
  - Mayor (2019–24): Friedbert Theis

Area
  - Total: 6.76 km^{2} (2.61 sq mi)
- Elevation: 453 m (1,486 ft)

Population (2025-12-31)
  - Total: 434
  - Density: 64.2/km^{2} (166/sq mi)
- Time zone: UTC+01:00 (CET)
  - Summer (DST): UTC+02:00 (CEST)
- Postal codes: 54316
- Dialling codes: 06588
- Vehicle registration: TR
- Website: www.holzerath.de

Holzerath (German pronunciation: [ˈhɔlt͡səʁaːt]) is a municipality in the Trier-Saarburg district, in Rhineland-Palatinate, Germany. The total population is 431 as of December 31, 2018. The Mayor is Freedbert Theis. The size of Holzerath is 6.76 km^{2} with elevation of 453 meters (1,486 feet).
