= Pluwig =

- Municipality
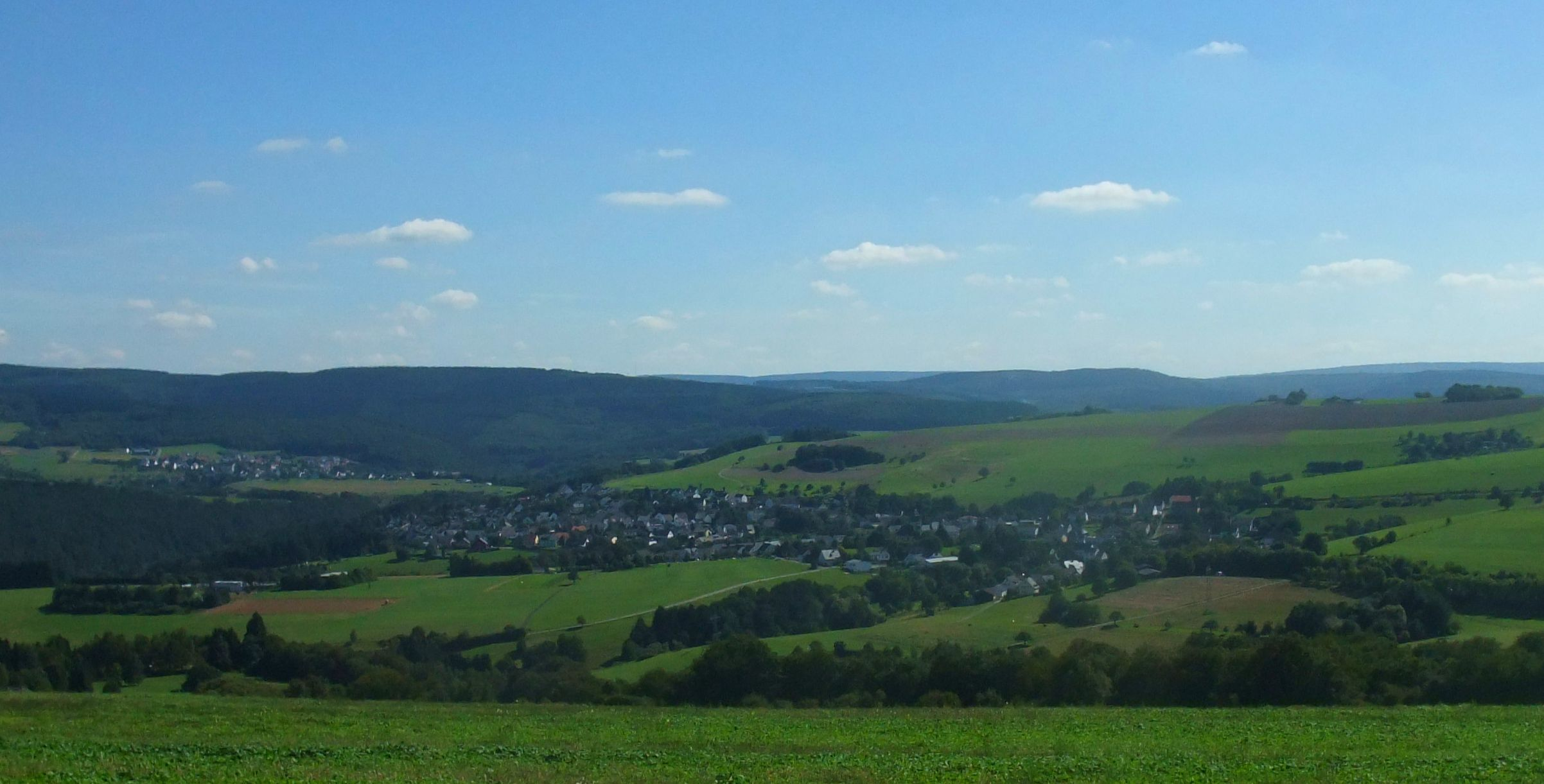

- Coat of arms

- Location of Pluwig within Trier-Saarburg district
- Interactive map of Pluwig
- Location within Germany Location within Rhineland-Palatinate
- Coordinates: 49°41′26″N 6°42′36″E
- Country: Germany
- State: Rhineland-Palatinate
- District: Trier-Saarburg
- Municipal assoc.: Ruwer

Government
  - Mayor (2019–24): Annelie Scherf

Area
  - Total: 4.87 km^{2} (1.88 sq mi)
- Elevation: 310 m (1,020 ft)

Population (2025-12-31)
  - Total: 1,619
  - Density: 332/km^{2} (861/sq mi)
- Time zone: UTC+01:00 (CET)
  - Summer (DST): UTC+02:00 (CEST)
- Postal codes: 54316
- Dialling codes: 06588
- Vehicle registration: TR
- Website: www.pluwig.de

Pluwig is a municipality in the Trier-Saarburg district, in Rhineland-Palatinate, Germany. It belongs to the Verbandsgemeinde Ruwer.

== Geography ==
Pluwig is close to Gusterath, Ollmuth and Franzenheim.

Districts are Pluwig, Wilzenburg, Willmerich, Geizenburg and Pluwigerhammer with the former railway station of Pluwig.

Flowig waters, which belong to Pluwig, are the left inflows of the Ruwer: the Gusterather Waschbach, the Wilzenburger Waschbach and the Geizenburger Waschbach.

== History ==
=== Population Growth ===
The development of the population is based on censuses:

Year	Population
1815	250
1835	370
1871	409
1905	441
1939	603
1950	657

Year	Population
1961	693
1970	779
1987	1.115
1997	1.192
2005	1.265
2019	1.681
