= Farschweiler =

- Municipality
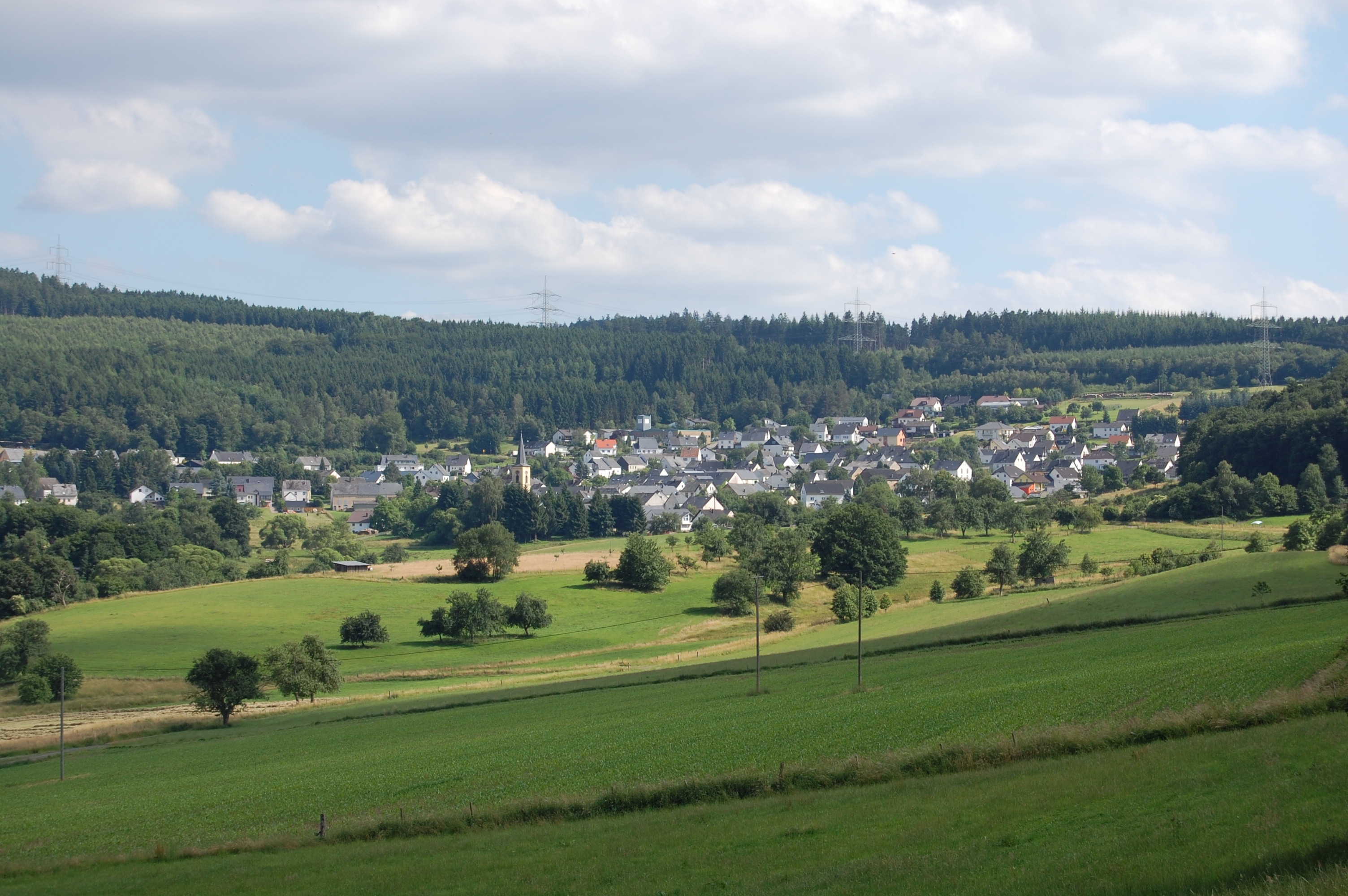

- Coat of arms

- Location of Farschweiler within Trier-Saarburg district
- Interactive map of Farschweiler
- Location within Germany Location within Rhineland-Palatinate
- Coordinates: 49°42′56″N 6°49′38″E
- Country: Germany
- State: Rhineland-Palatinate
- District: Trier-Saarburg
- Municipal assoc.: Ruwer

Area
  - Total: 7.45 km^{2} (2.88 sq mi)
- Elevation: 470 m (1,540 ft)

Population (2025-12-31)
  - Total: 816
  - Density: 110/km^{2} (284/sq mi)
- Time zone: UTC+01:00 (CET)
  - Summer (DST): UTC+02:00 (CEST)
- Postal codes: 54317
- Dialling codes: 06500
- Vehicle registration: TR
- Website: www.farschweiler.de

Farschweiler is a municipality in the Trier-Saarburg district, in Rhineland-Palatinate, Germany.
