= Osburg =

- Municipality
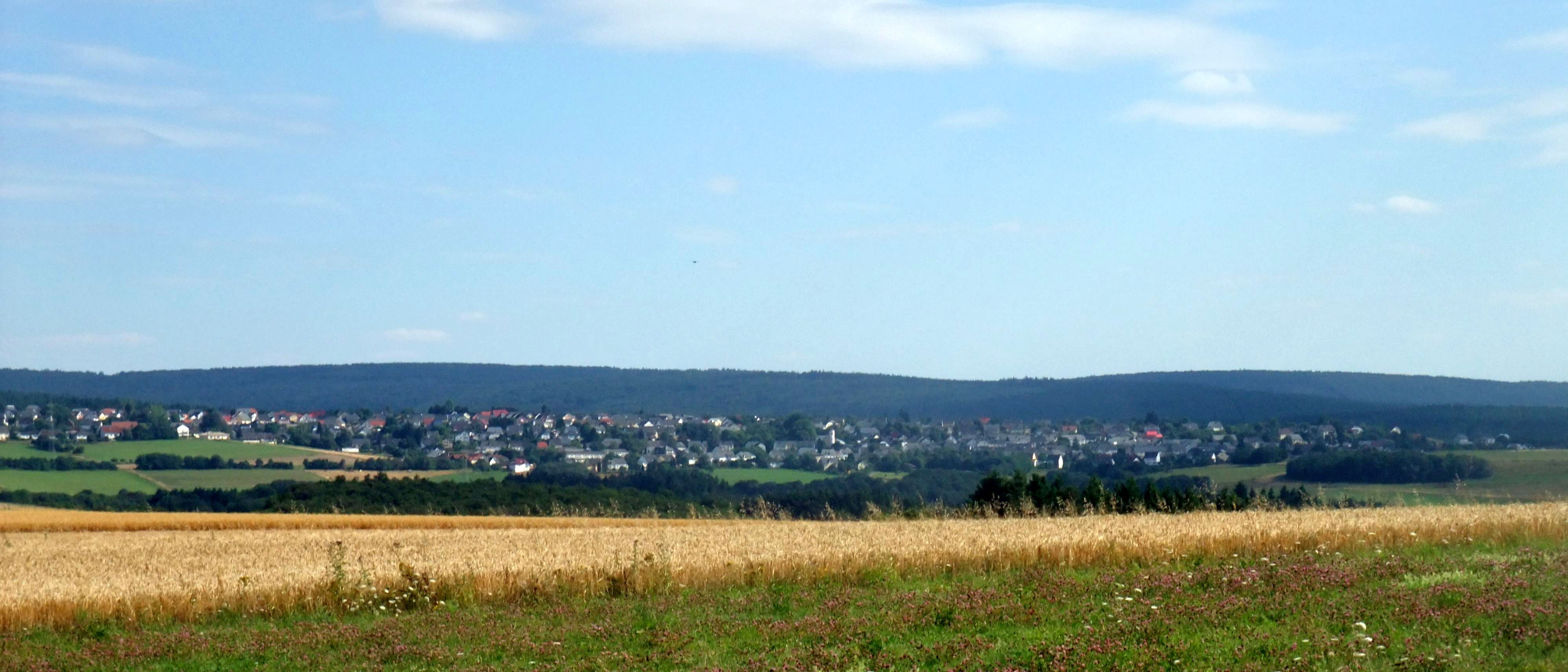

- Coat of arms

- Location of Osburg within Trier-Saarburg district
- Interactive map of Osburg
- Location within Germany Location within Rhineland-Palatinate
- Coordinates: 49°42′53″N 6°47′34″E
- Country: Germany
- State: Rhineland-Palatinate
- District: Trier-Saarburg
- Municipal assoc.: Ruwer

Area
  - Total: 33.92 km^{2} (13.10 sq mi)
- Elevation: 456 m (1,496 ft)

Population (2025-12-31)
  - Total: 2,296
  - Density: 67.69/km^{2} (175.3/sq mi)
- Time zone: UTC+01:00 (CET)
  - Summer (DST): UTC+02:00 (CEST)
- Postal codes: 54317
- Dialling codes: 06500
- Vehicle registration: TR

Osburg (German pronunciation: [ˈoːsbʊʁk]) is a municipality in the Trier-Saarburg district, in Rhineland-Palatinate, Germany, near Trier. The elevation of the built up area lies between 437 and 500 m, and the lowest and highest points of the municipality are 239 and 708 m.
