= Bundesbank bunker =

Underground bunker in Germany

- Near Cochem in Germany
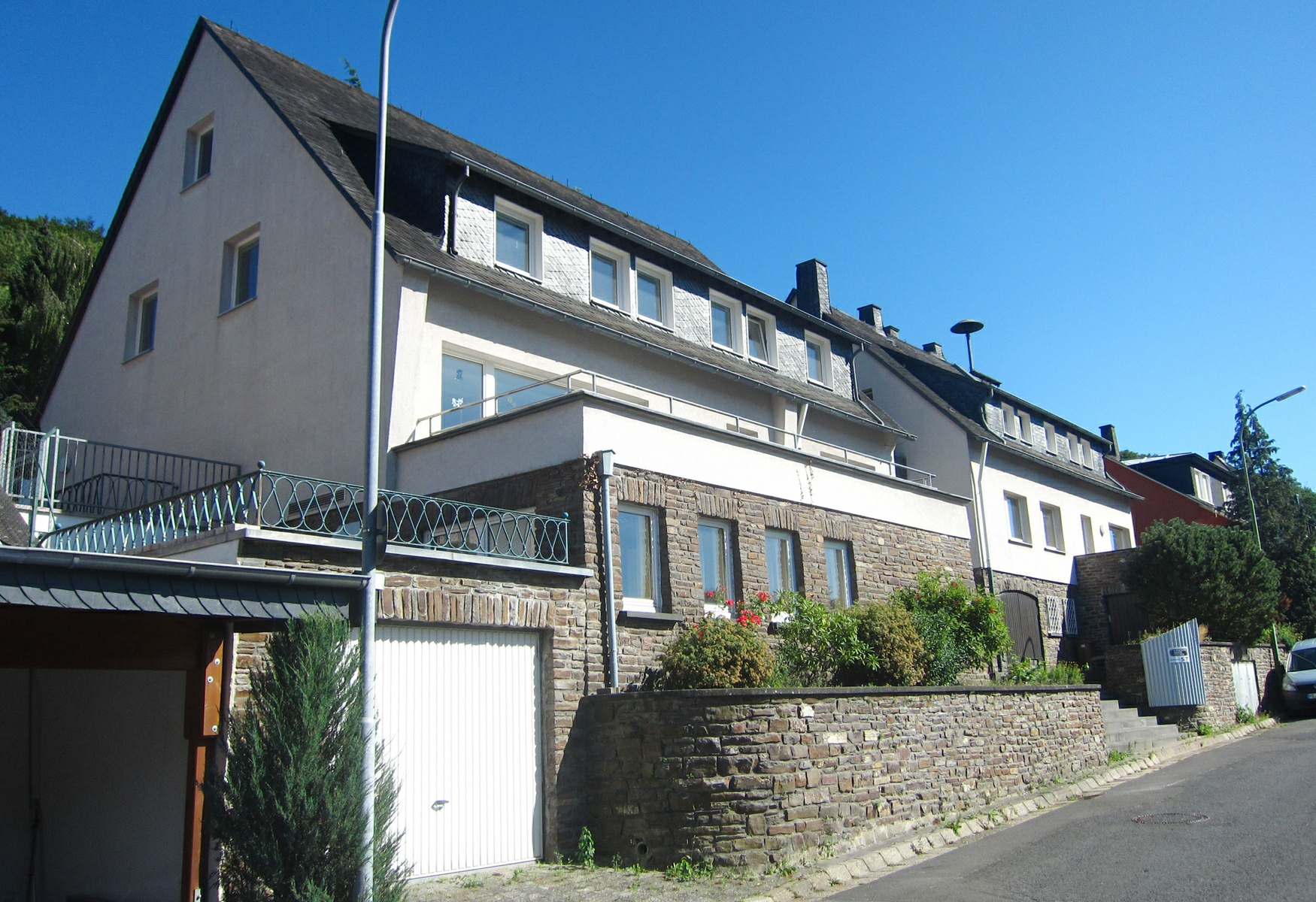

Site information
- Type: Bunker

Location
- Location within Rhineland-Palatinate
- Coordinates: 50.1523111°N 7.1751388°E

Site history
- Built: 1964
- In use: 1988

The Bundesbank bunker was the German central bank's bunker in Cochem (Rheinland-Pfalz) for the preservation of an emergency currency. From 1964 to 1988, the Deutsche Bundesbank stored up to 15 billion marks in the top-secret facility, to protect West Germany from a national economic crisis in the event of potential hyperinflation that might be caused by the Cold War.

== History ==
In the years of the Cold War there was always the danger that a conflict between the West (NATO) and the Eastern bloc (Warsaw Pact) could break out. The Federal Republic of Germany was endangered by its position as a border state between the two blocs. For this reason, various security measures were taken in the Federal Republic, such as the government bunker built at this time at Ahrweiler. A similar bunker for the preservation of currency reserves was built for the then Landeszentralbank of Rheinland-Pfalz at the Spechtmühle near Lorscheid in the district of Trier-Saarburg.

There was a concern that the Eastern bloc might introduce large numbers of counterfeit banknotes into West Germany to cause hyperinflation. Therefore, a reserve emergency currency was stored so that purchasing power could be maintained. For this purpose, a special series of the German Mark, the BBk II, was printed. The money stock was randomly checked every three months by a Bundesbank auditor. Apart from these auditors, nobody was allowed to enter the bunker.

In 1988, the emergency currency was destroyed and the bunker was initially left empty. In 1994, the Deutsche Bundesbank sold the investment to Volksbank Cochem. Lockers for customers were installed in a vault of the bunker, but most of the complex remained untouched.

The entire facility, consisting of the above-ground plot with two large camouflage dwellings and the underground bunker and vault system, was sold in 2014 for less than 500,000 euros to a Treis-Karden entrepreneur, who repaired the bunker and turned it into a museum. The zoning plan was changed in 2015 for this purpose, but group tours have been offered since the end of 2015. Since March 2016, the bunker at Cochem is also open to individuals for guided tours as an official documentation site; a shuttle bus runs from May to the end of October from Endertplatz in Cochem to the bunker. The former camouflage homes were converted into a hotel.

== Location and structure ==
The 1,500-square-metre bunker was built by the Deutsche Bundesbank between 1962 and 1964 in the Cond district of Cochem, near the Hunsrück, some 30 metres below the surface. Cochem was deliberately chosen for the location because the Moselle valley offers a very good protection, for example against a nuclear blast. Furthermore, it is on the left bank of the Rhine. Frankfurt am Main is 108 km east as the crow flies and was thus closer to the inner German border and the Fulda Gap.

The above-ground part of the plant, on a 8,700 square metre site, was disguised as a training and recreational home of the Deutsche Bundesbank in a residential area. The bunker has a main and an emergency access. The bunker can be accessed via the main entrance, located at 35, Am Wald, or through the basement of the training centre. The emergency exit is located in the cooling tower in the back of the garden and is camouflaged by trees and shrubs.

To protect the bunker, a security system with sensors was installed in the walls of the vaults, which reacted to shocks and noise. When an alarm was triggered, the local police were automatically notified, but they did not know what was in the bunker. Only the director of the installation could enter the bunker and listen to noises in the vault by means of an intercom. The vault itself could only be accessed by a few employees of the Bundesbank from Frankfurt, as the associated keys were not stored on site.

In the event of a nuclear war, the bunker would have protected up to 100 civilians who could have survived two weeks there. In addition to the vaults, there were also sleeping and working rooms, a warning post and a radio room with a direct connection to the Ministry of the Interior. The system had its own electricity supply by diesel generators and 18,000 litres of fuel reserves; the drinking water supply was secured by means of deep well secured and a 40,000 litre tank. The air supply for breathing was ensured by a sand filter.
