= Bonerath =

- Municipality
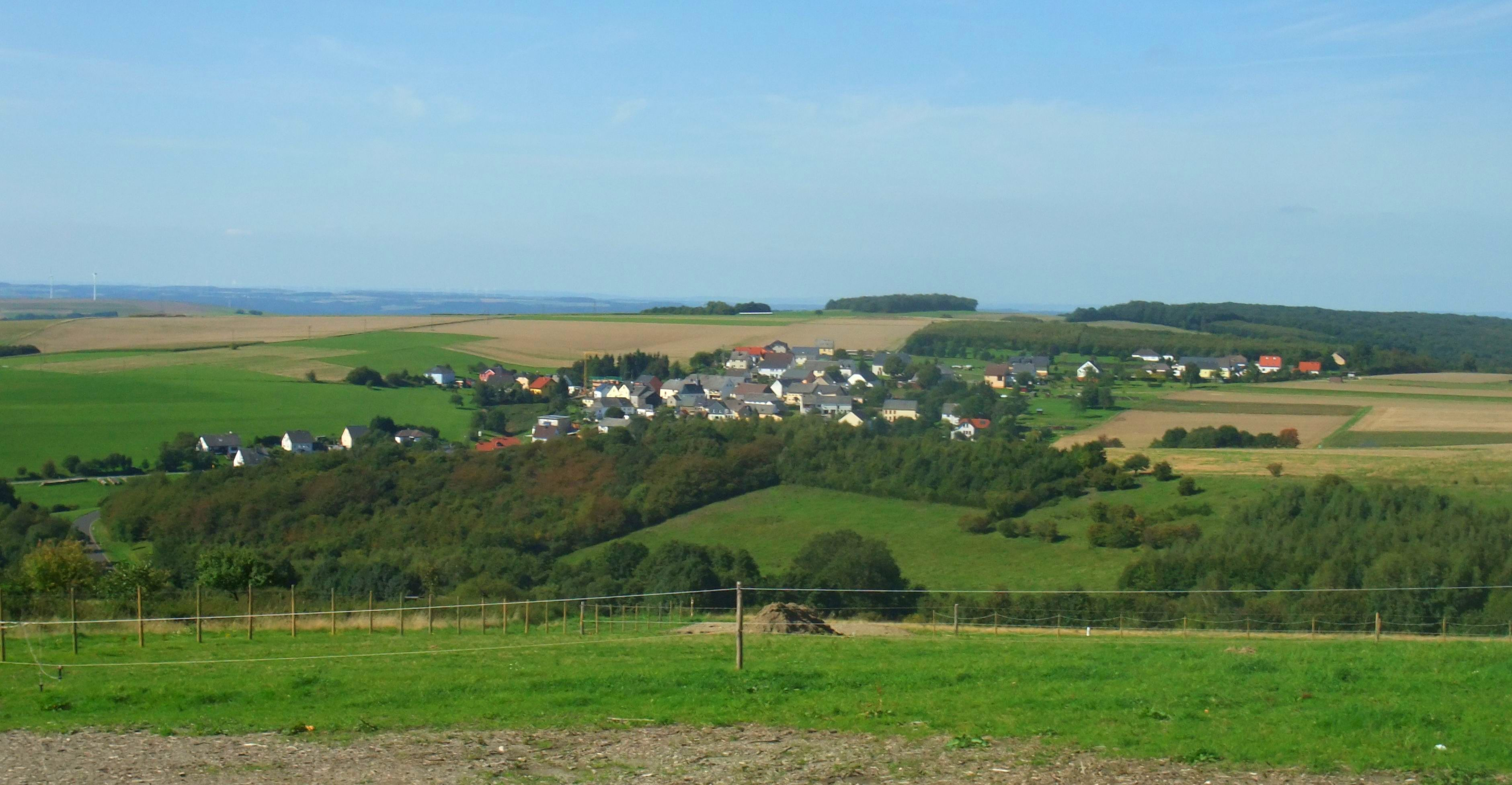

- Coat of arms

- Location of Bonerath within Trier-Saarburg district
- Interactive map of Bonerath
- Location within Germany Location within Rhineland-Palatinate
- Coordinates: 49°41′25″N 6°45′29″E
- Country: Germany
- State: Rhineland-Palatinate
- District: Trier-Saarburg
- Municipal assoc.: Ruwer

Government
  - Mayor (2019–24): Gabriele Terres

Area
  - Total: 4.25 km^{2} (1.64 sq mi)
- Elevation: 320 m (1,050 ft)

Population (2025-12-31)
  - Total: 226
  - Density: 53.2/km^{2} (138/sq mi)
- Time zone: UTC+01:00 (CET)
  - Summer (DST): UTC+02:00 (CEST)
- Postal codes: 54316
- Dialling codes: 06588
- Vehicle registration: TR
- Website: bonerath.de

Bonerath is a municipality in the Trier-Saarburg district, in Rhineland-Palatinate, Germany.
