= Gutweiler =

- Municipality
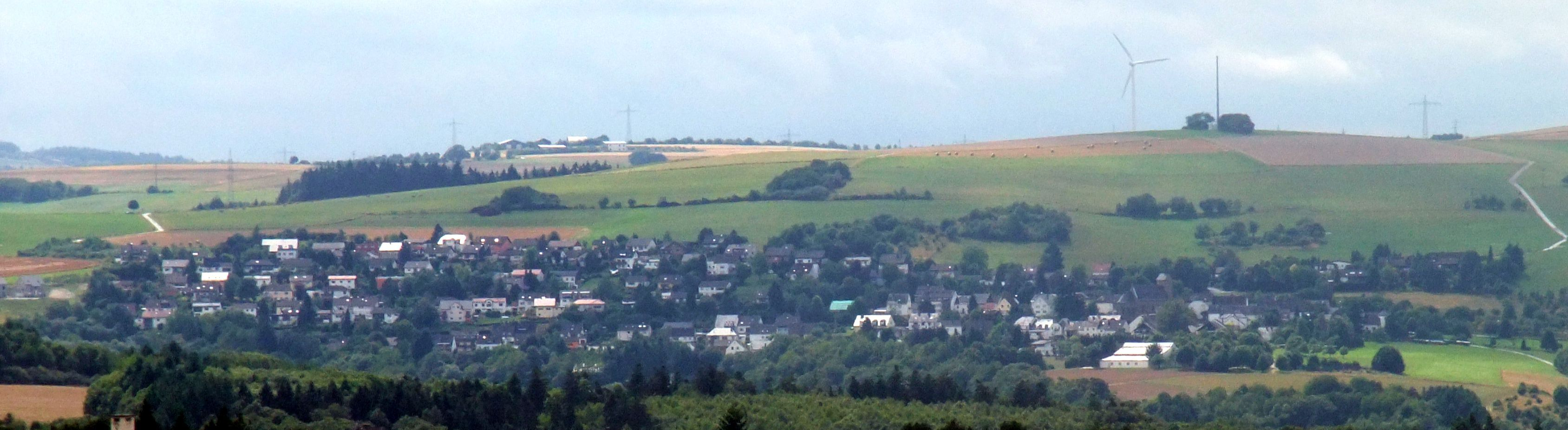

- Coat of arms

- Location of Gutweiler within Trier-Saarburg district
- Interactive map of Gutweiler
- Location within Germany Location within Rhineland-Palatinate
- Coordinates: 49°43′12″N 6°43′36″E
- Country: Germany
- State: Rhineland-Palatinate
- District: Trier-Saarburg
- Municipal assoc.: Ruwer

Government
  - Mayor (2019–24): Ralph Biedinger

Area
  - Total: 2.51 km^{2} (0.97 sq mi)
- Elevation: 300 m (980 ft)

Population (2025-12-31)
  - Total: 748
  - Density: 298/km^{2} (772/sq mi)
- Time zone: UTC+01:00 (CET)
  - Summer (DST): UTC+02:00 (CEST)
- Postal codes: 54317
- Dialling codes: 06588
- Vehicle registration: TR
- Website: www.gutweiler.de

Gutweiler is a municipality in the Trier-Saarburg district, in Rhineland-Palatinate, Germany.
