= Hinzenburg =

- Municipality
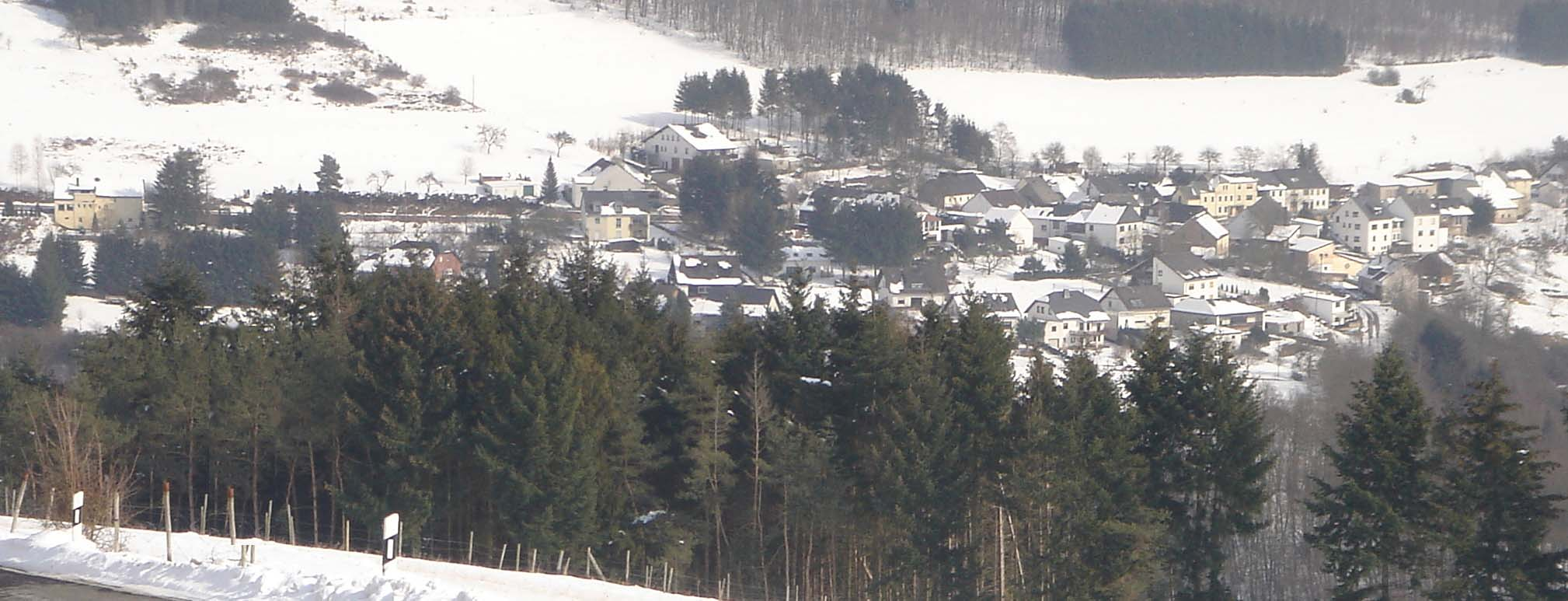

- Coat of arms

- Location of Hinzenburg within Trier-Saarburg district
- Interactive map of Hinzenburg
- Location within Germany Location within Rhineland-Palatinate
- Coordinates: 49°39′51.65″N 6°43′33.75″E
- Country: Germany
- State: Rhineland-Palatinate
- District: Trier-Saarburg
- Municipal assoc.: Ruwer

Government
  - Mayor (2019–24): Werner Scherf

Area
  - Total: 2.87 km^{2} (1.11 sq mi)
- Elevation: 331 m (1,086 ft)

Population (2025-12-31)
  - Total: 129
  - Density: 44.9/km^{2} (116/sq mi)
- Time zone: UTC+01:00 (CET)
  - Summer (DST): UTC+02:00 (CEST)
- Postal codes: 54316
- Dialling codes: 06588
- Vehicle registration: TR
- Website: www.hinzenburg.de

Hinzenburg is a municipality in the Trier-Saarburg district, in Rhineland-Palatinate, Germany.
