= Ollmuth =

- Municipality
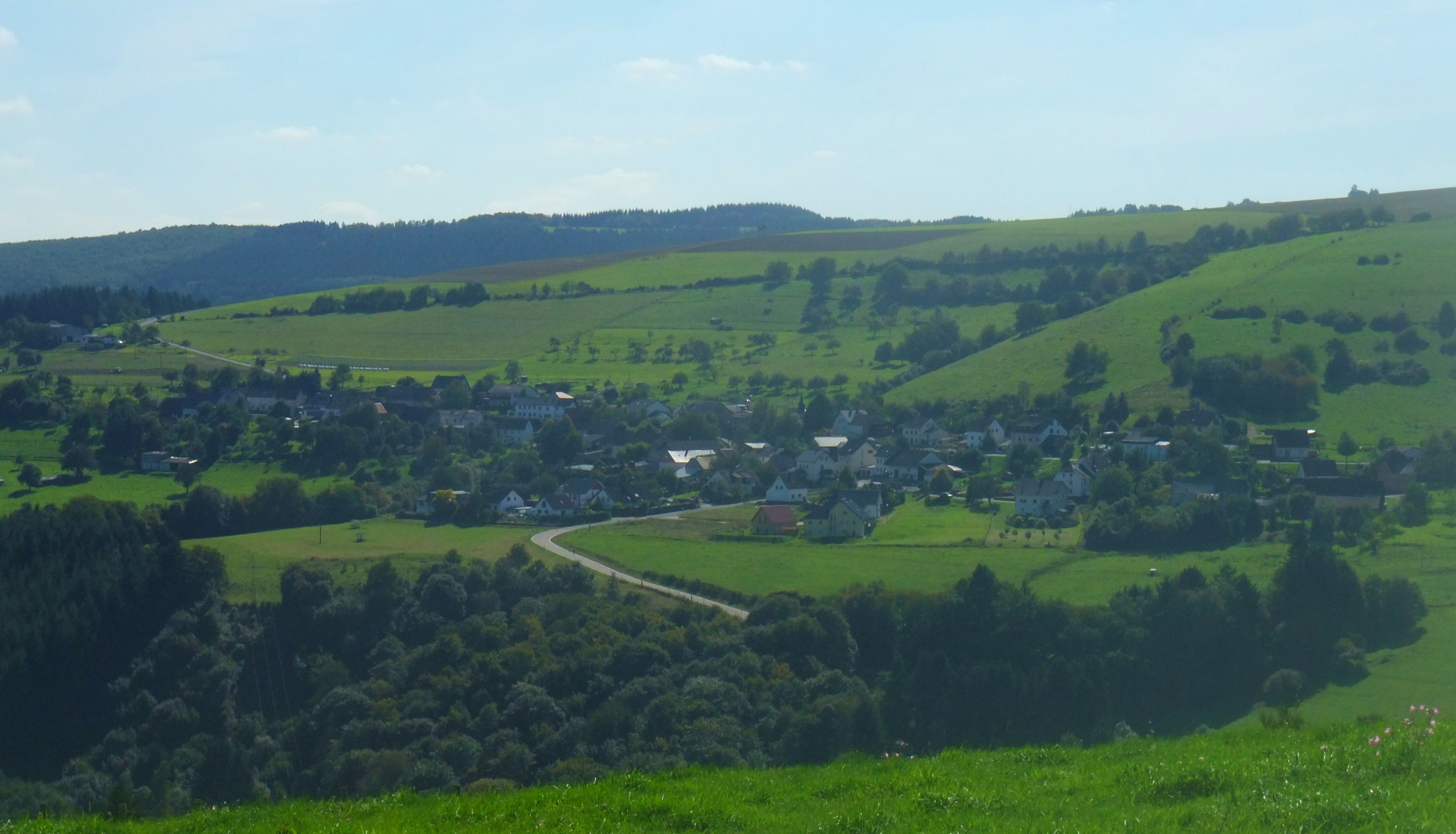

- Coat of arms

- Location of Ollmuth within Trier-Saarburg district
- Interactive map of Ollmuth
- Location within Germany Location within Rhineland-Palatinate
- Coordinates: 49°40′15.92″N 6°42′51.87″E
- Country: Germany
- State: Rhineland-Palatinate
- District: Trier-Saarburg
- Municipal assoc.: Ruwer

Government
  - Mayor (2019–24): Gerd Dietzen

Area
  - Total: 3.95 km^{2} (1.53 sq mi)
- Elevation: 338 m (1,109 ft)

Population (2025-12-31)
  - Total: 150
  - Density: 38/km^{2} (98/sq mi)
- Time zone: UTC+01:00 (CET)
  - Summer (DST): UTC+02:00 (CEST)
- Postal codes: 54316
- Dialling codes: 06588
- Vehicle registration: TR
- Website: www.ollmuth.de

Ollmuth is a municipality in the Trier-Saarburg district, in Rhineland-Palatinate, Germany.
