= Morscheid =

- Municipality
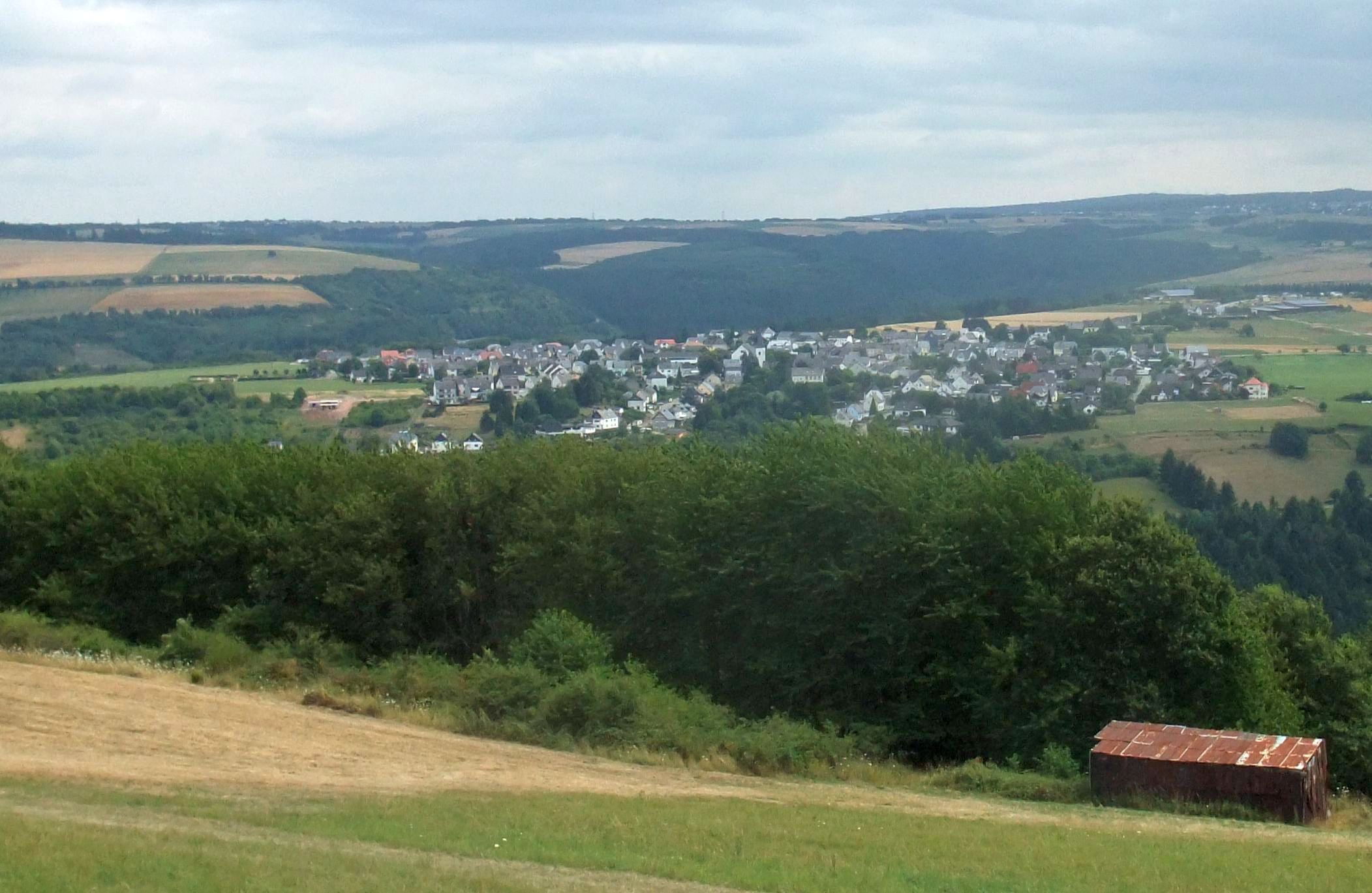

- Coat of arms

- Location of Morscheid within Trier-Saarburg district
- Interactive map of Morscheid
- Location within Germany Location within Rhineland-Palatinate
- Coordinates: 49°43′57″N 6°44′58″E
- Country: Germany
- State: Rhineland-Palatinate
- District: Trier-Saarburg
- Municipal assoc.: Ruwer

Government
  - Mayor (2019–24): Josef Weber

Area
  - Total: 5.48 km^{2} (2.12 sq mi)
- Elevation: 245 m (804 ft)

Population (2025-12-31)
  - Total: 878
  - Density: 160/km^{2} (415/sq mi)
- Time zone: UTC+01:00 (CET)
  - Summer (DST): UTC+02:00 (CEST)
- Postal codes: 54317
- Dialling codes: 06500
- Vehicle registration: TR
- Website: www.morscheid.de

Morscheid is a municipality in the Trier-Saarburg district, in Rhineland-Palatinate, Germany.
