= Lorscheid =

- Municipality
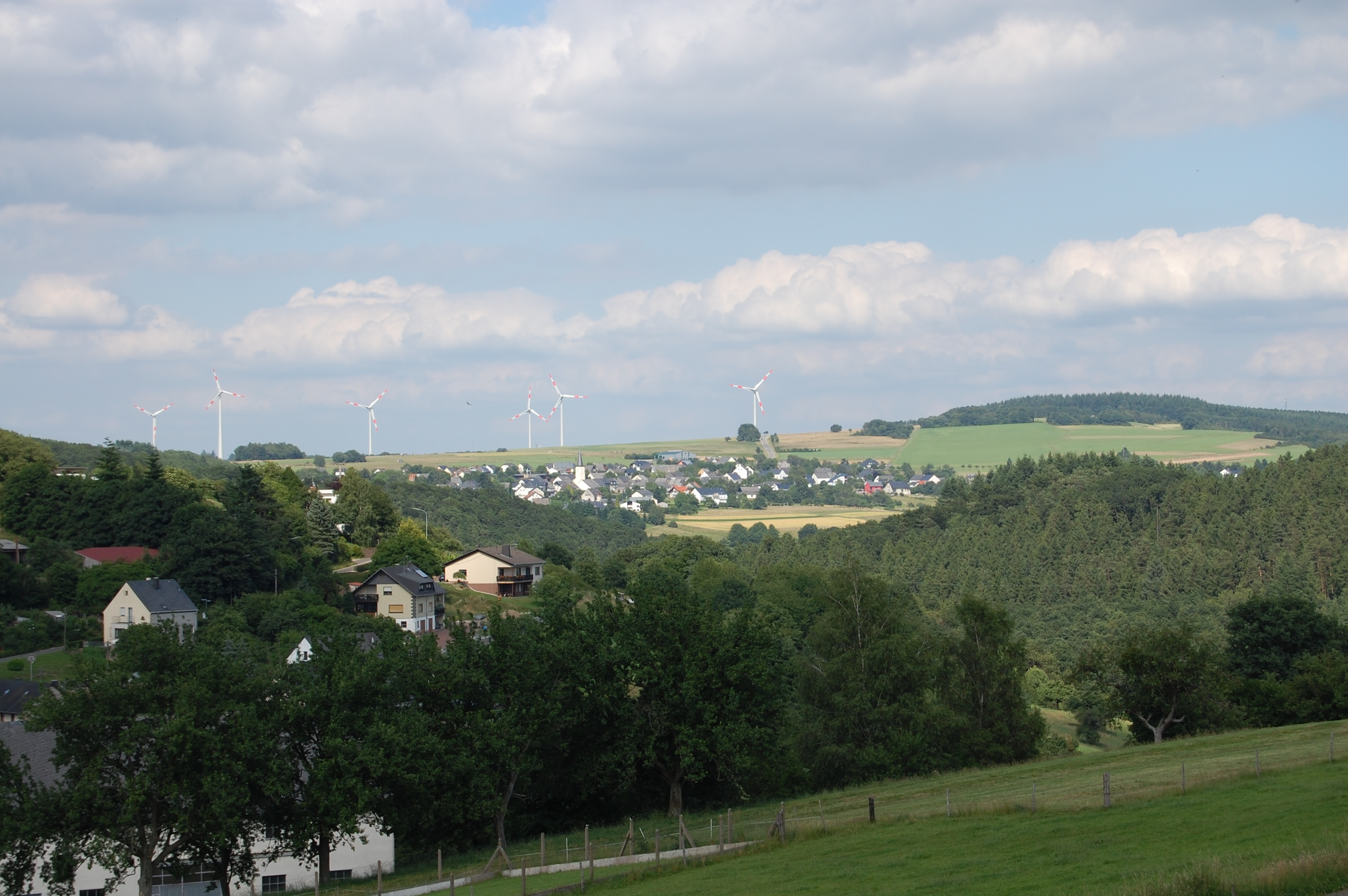

- Coat of arms

- Location of Lorscheid within Trier-Saarburg district
- Interactive map of Lorscheid
- Location within Germany Location within Rhineland-Palatinate
- Coordinates: 49°44′14″N 6°50′57″E
- Country: Germany
- State: Rhineland-Palatinate
- District: Trier-Saarburg
- Municipal assoc.: Ruwer

Government
  - Mayor (2019–24): Jutta Gard-Becker

Area
  - Total: 5.09 km^{2} (1.97 sq mi)
- Elevation: 420 m (1,380 ft)

Population (2025-12-31)
  - Total: 528
  - Density: 104/km^{2} (269/sq mi)
- Time zone: UTC+01:00 (CET)
  - Summer (DST): UTC+02:00 (CEST)
- Postal codes: 54317
- Dialling codes: 06500
- Vehicle registration: TR

Lorscheid is a municipality in the Trier-Saarburg district, in Rhineland-Palatinate, Germany.
