= Korlingen =

- Municipality
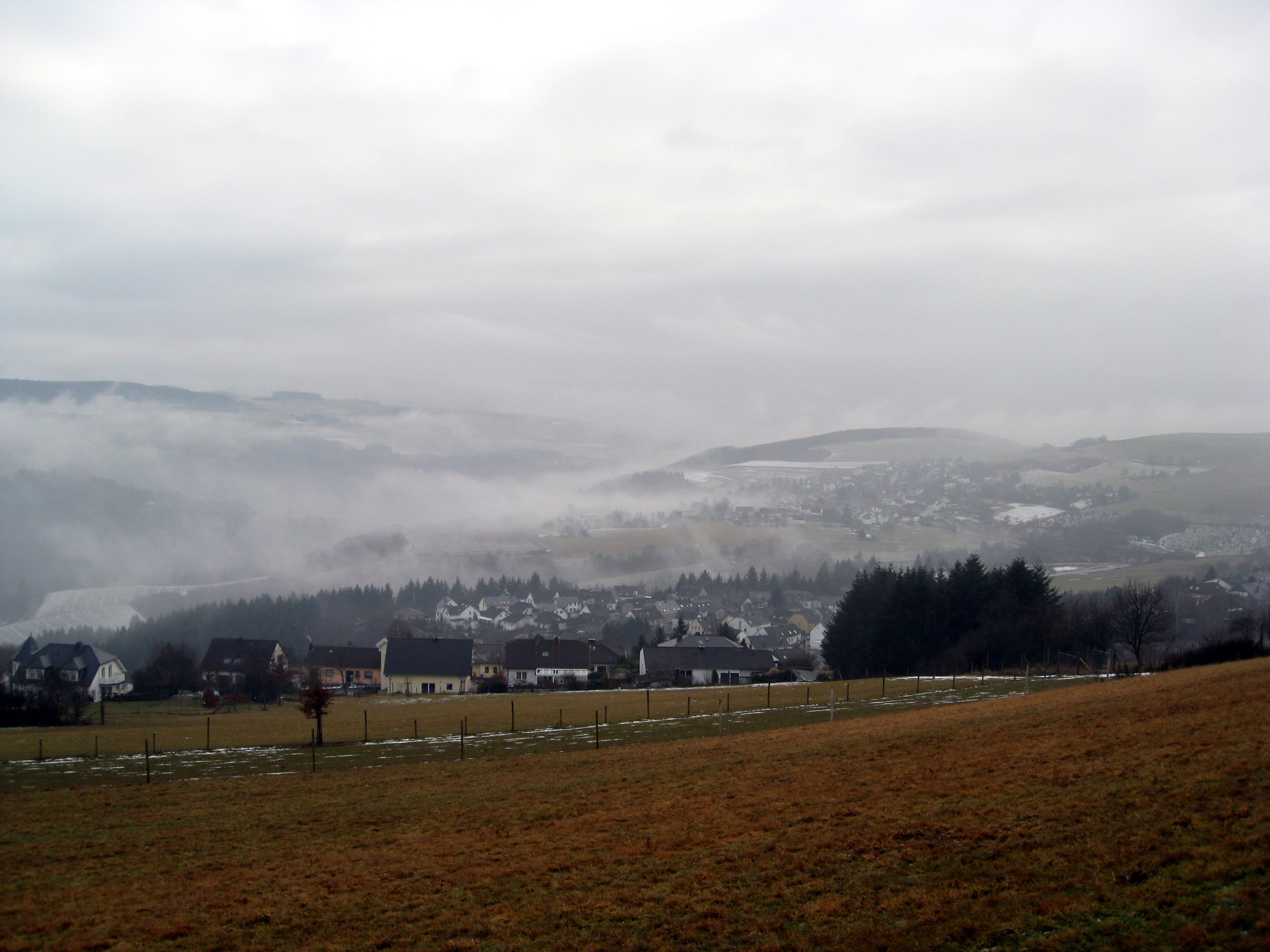

- Coat of arms

- Location of Korlingen within Trier-Saarburg district
- Interactive map of Korlingen
- Location within Germany Location within Rhineland-Palatinate
- Coordinates: 49°43′38.35″N 6°43′28.15″E
- Country: Germany
- State: Rhineland-Palatinate
- District: Trier-Saarburg
- Municipal assoc.: Ruwer

Government
  - Mayor (2019–24): Damian Peter Marx

Area
  - Total: 2.08 km^{2} (0.80 sq mi)
- Elevation: 300 m (980 ft)

Population (2025-12-31)
  - Total: 747
  - Density: 359/km^{2} (930/sq mi)
- Time zone: UTC+01:00 (CET)
  - Summer (DST): UTC+02:00 (CEST)
- Postal codes: 54317
- Dialling codes: 06588
- Vehicle registration: TR
- Website: www.korlingen.de

Korlingen is a municipality in the Trier-Saarburg district, in Rhineland-Palatinate, Germany.
