= Sommerau =

- Municipality
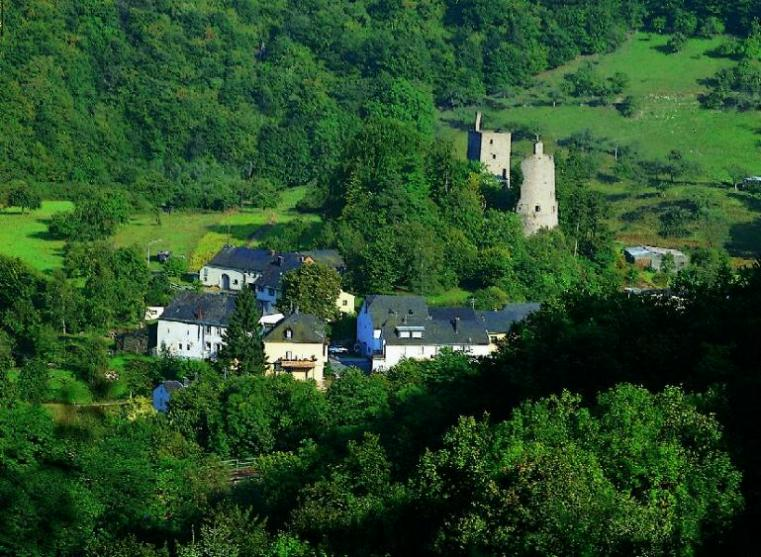

- Coat of arms

- Location of Sommerau within Trier-Saarburg district
- Interactive map of Sommerau
- Location within Germany Location within Rhineland-Palatinate
- Coordinates: 49°42′52″N 6°44′12″E
- Country: Germany
- State: Rhineland-Palatinate
- District: Trier-Saarburg
- Municipal assoc.: Ruwer

Government
  - Mayor (2019–24): Lydia Mittelbronn

Area
  - Total: 1.04 km^{2} (0.40 sq mi)
- Elevation: 322 m (1,056 ft)

Population (2025-12-31)
  - Total: 71
  - Density: 68/km^{2} (180/sq mi)
- Time zone: UTC+01:00 (CET)
  - Summer (DST): UTC+02:00 (CEST)
- Postal codes: 54317
- Dialling codes: 06588
- Vehicle registration: TR

Sommerau is a municipality in the Trier-Saarburg district, in Rhineland-Palatinate, Germany.
