= Ruwer/Eitelsbach =

Quarter of Trier, Germany

Coordinates: 49°47′N 6°43′E

Ruwer/Eitelsbach is a quarter of Trier, Germany.

Eitelsbach was a small village at the Ruwer (river) in Germany's Mosel region and famous for the wine estate Karthäuserhof and the associated vineyard Karthäuserhofberg, which means "Carthusians' Hill". The wines are labeled "Eitelsbacher Karthäuserhofberger."

Eitelsbach and Ruwer were added to Trier in 1969. They formed the Trier district of Ruwer/Eitelsbach in 1974.
