= Schöndorf, Rhineland-Palatinate =

Schöndorf
- Municipality
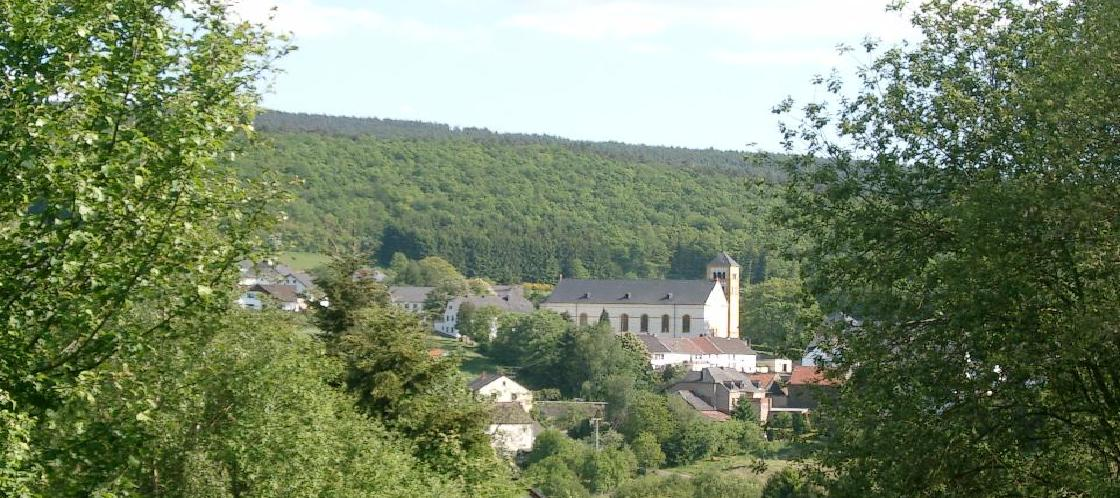

- Coat of arms

- Location of Schöndorf within Trier-Saarburg district
- Interactive map of Schöndorf
- Location within Germany Location within Rhineland-Palatinate
- Coordinates: 49°40′43.46″N 6°44′26.25″E
- Country: Germany
- State: Rhineland-Palatinate
- District: Trier-Saarburg
- Municipal assoc.: Ruwer

Government
  - Mayor (2019–24): Uwe Kirchartz (FW)

Area
  - Total: 10 km^{2} (3.9 sq mi)
- Elevation: 435 m (1,427 ft)

Population (2025-12-31)
  - Total: 788
  - Density: 79/km^{2} (200/sq mi)
- Time zone: UTC+01:00 (CET)
  - Summer (DST): UTC+02:00 (CEST)
- Postal codes: 54316
- Dialling codes: 06588
- Vehicle registration: TR
- Website: gemeinde-schoendorf.de

Schöndorf (German pronunciation: [ˈʃøːndɔʁf]) is a municipality in the Trier-Saarburg district, in Rhineland-Palatinate, Germany.
