= Mertesdorf =

- Municipality
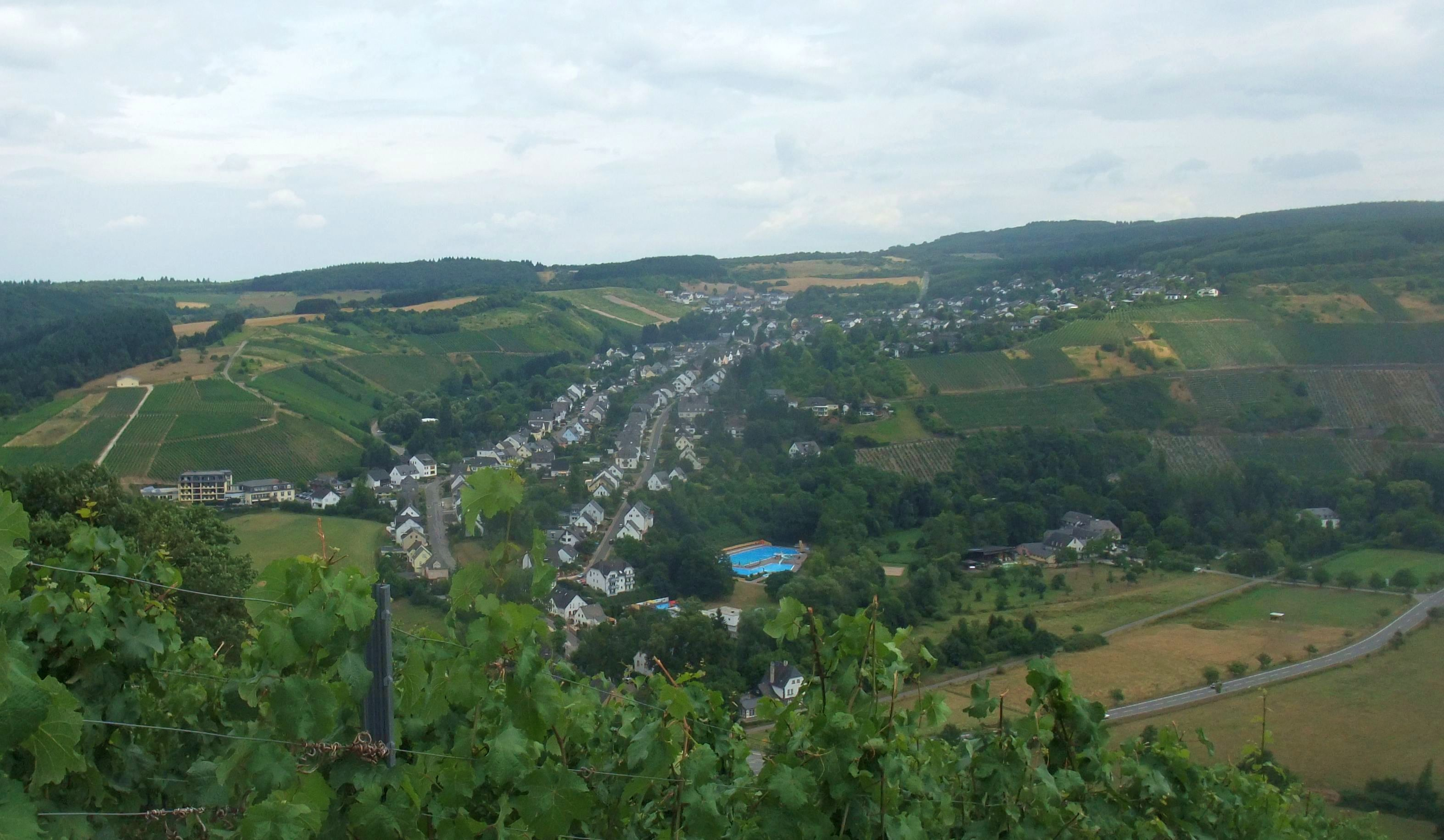

- Coat of arms

- Location of Mertesdorf within Trier-Saarburg district
- Interactive map of Mertesdorf
- Location within Germany Location within Rhineland-Palatinate
- Coordinates: 49°46′19″N 6°43′58″E
- Country: Germany
- State: Rhineland-Palatinate
- District: Trier-Saarburg
- Municipal assoc.: Ruwer

Government
  - Mayor (2019–24): Andreas Stüttgen (SPD)

Area
  - Total: 6.47 km^{2} (2.50 sq mi)
- Elevation: 300 m (980 ft)

Population (2025-12-31)
  - Total: 1,751
  - Density: 271/km^{2} (701/sq mi)
- Time zone: UTC+01:00 (CET)
  - Summer (DST): UTC+02:00 (CEST)
- Postal codes: 54318
- Dialling codes: 0651
- Vehicle registration: TR
- Website: www.mertesdorf.de

Mertesdorf is a municipality in the Trier-Saarburg district, in Rhineland-Palatinate, Germany, near Trier. Grünhaus is a part of Mertesdorf.
