= Waldrach =

- Municipality
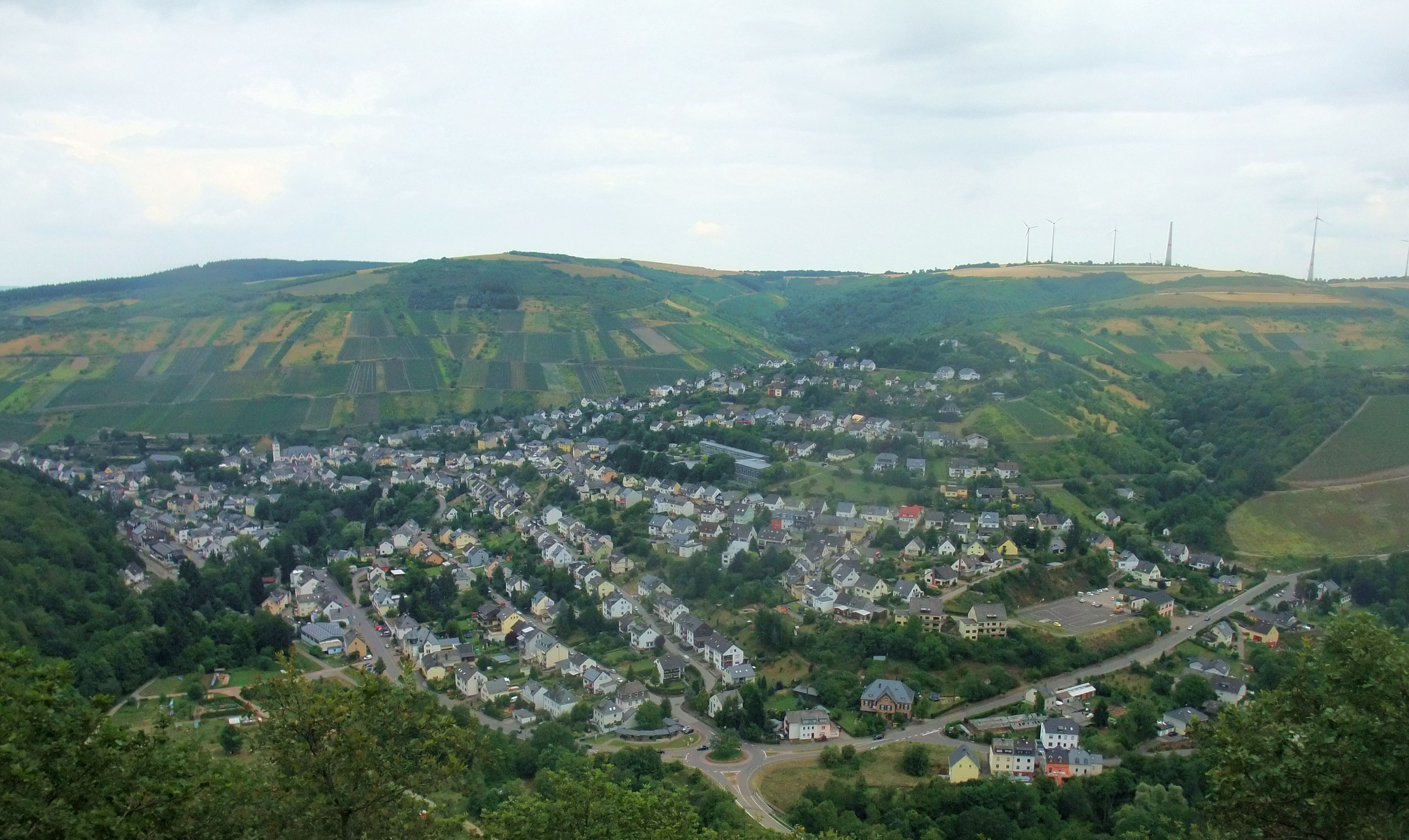

- Coat of arms

- Location of Waldrach within Trier-Saarburg district
- Interactive map of Waldrach
- Location within Germany Location within Rhineland-Palatinate
- Coordinates: 49°45′N 6°45′E
- Country: Germany
- State: Rhineland-Palatinate
- District: Trier-Saarburg
- Municipal assoc.: Ruwer

Government
  - Mayor (2019–24): Rainer Krämer (CDU)

Area
  - Total: 12.45 km^{2} (4.81 sq mi)
- Elevation: 159 m (522 ft)

Population (2025-12-31)
  - Total: 2,114
  - Density: 169.8/km^{2} (439.8/sq mi)
- Time zone: UTC+01:00 (CET)
  - Summer (DST): UTC+02:00 (CEST)
- Postal codes: 54320
- Dialling codes: 06500
- Vehicle registration: TR
- Website: www.waldrach.de

Waldrach is a municipality in the Trier-Saarburg district, in Rhineland-Palatinate, Germany, near Trier.
