= Kasel =

- Municipality
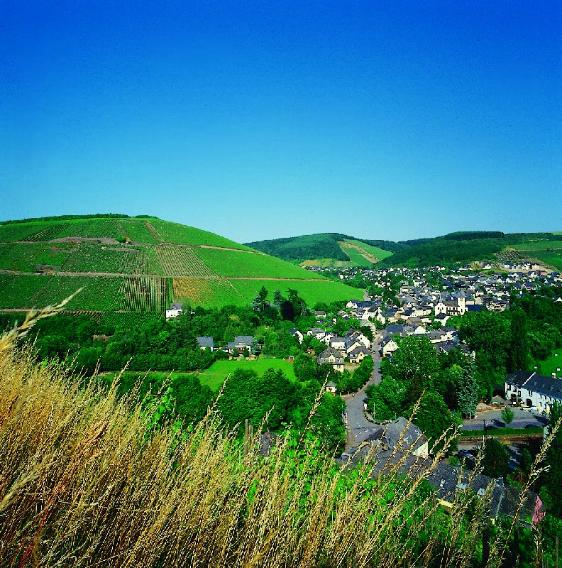

- Coat of arms

- Location of Kasel within Trier-Saarburg district
- Interactive map of Kasel
- Location within Germany Location within Rhineland-Palatinate
- Coordinates: 49°45′40″N 6°44′3″E
- Country: Germany
- State: Rhineland-Palatinate
- District: Trier-Saarburg
- Municipal assoc.: Ruwer

Government
  - Mayor (2019–24): Karl-Heinrich Ewald (SPD)

Area
  - Total: 4.53 km^{2} (1.75 sq mi)
- Elevation: 300 m (980 ft)

Population (2025-12-31)
  - Total: 1,285
  - Density: 284/km^{2} (735/sq mi)
- Time zone: UTC+01:00 (CET)
  - Summer (DST): UTC+02:00 (CEST)
- Postal codes: 54317
- Dialling codes: 0651
- Vehicle registration: TR
- Website: Website von Kasel

Kasel (German pronunciation: [ˈkaːzl̩]) is a municipality in the Trier-Saarburg district, in Rhineland-Palatinate, Germany.
