= Jauch family =

German Hanseatic family

Jauch
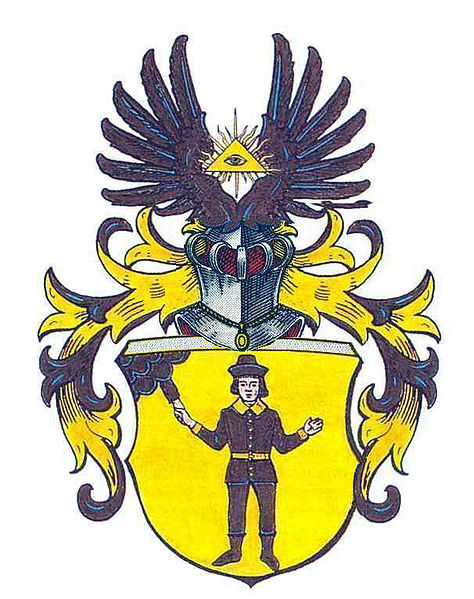
- Motto (1683); HERR DU LEITEST MICH; NACH DEINEN RATH (Lord thou shalt guide me with thy counsel)
- Current region: Germany; Canada
- Earlier spellings: Joherr
- Etymology: yes-man
- Origin: Sultza Villa (1495) in the; Electorate of Saxony, Imperial State of the; Holy Roman Empire
- Members: Günther Jauch (German television host); Hans Jauch (German Freikorps leader); Heinrich Jauch (State attorney in the Third Reich); Joachim Daniel Jauch (German Baroque architect); Walter Jauch (Founder of AON Germany)
- Distinctions: Hereditary Grand Burghers of the Free and Hanseatic City of Hamburg (1832); Hanseaten (class); The most popular German: Günther Jauch embodies for the Germans ahead of any other celebrity ″the Germany they desire". (2010); Dedication: Baroque cradle of August Jauch, National Museum, Kraków, christening gift from August the Strong
- Estates: In Germany: – Manor houses: Krummbek Manor; Schönhagen Manor; Wellingsbüttel Manor; – Wineries: Von Othegraven Winery; In Guatemala: Armenia Lorena Plantation; In Poland: Palais Jauch (Warsaw); Lelewel Palace (Warsaw)

The Jauch family is a German Hanseatic family that can be traced back to the Late Middle Ages. In the late 17th century, they settled in the Free and Hanseatic City of Hamburg, where they engaged in long-distance trade. Members of the family became hereditary grand burghers of Hamburg and acquired the Lordship of Wellingsbüttel, today a part of the city's Wellingsbüttel district.

The Jauch family has produced a number of notable descendants, both through the male and female lines.

== Overview ==
=== Pre-Hanseatic time ===
The Jauch family originates from Thuringia, where the earliest known family member, the widow Lena Joherrin, is recorded in 1495 in what is now Bad Sulza.

Johann Christian Jauch the Elder (1638–1718) left Sulza and entered the service of the Güstrow branch of the Grand Ducal House of Mecklenburg. Two of his sons subsequently entered the service of the Electors of Saxony, who were also Kings of Poland –Franz Georg Jauch (b. 1681), a lieutenant colonel in the Royal Guards and Joachim Daniel Jauch (1688–1754), a major general. Both branches were erroneously regarded as aristocratic. They became extinct in the 18th century.

The members of the family who had served the Grand Ducal House of Mecklenburg left the ducal residence of Güstrow in 1696 and moved to Lüneburg, which at that time held a status equivalent to that of a Free Imperial City. In 1701 they acquired Lüneburg citizenship (German: Bürgerrecht). Although the family in Lüneburg produced clerics and jurists–including a canon, a lay canon, a dean and a Hanover council senator–it was not limited to the urban educated middle class (German: Bildungsbürgertum). Other members engaged in commerce, being recorded 1699 as members of the „Uraltes löbliches Kramer-Amt“, the traditional merchants' guild of Hamburg – and later developed into internationally active merchants.

=== Hanseatics ===
==== Grand Burghers of Hamburg ====
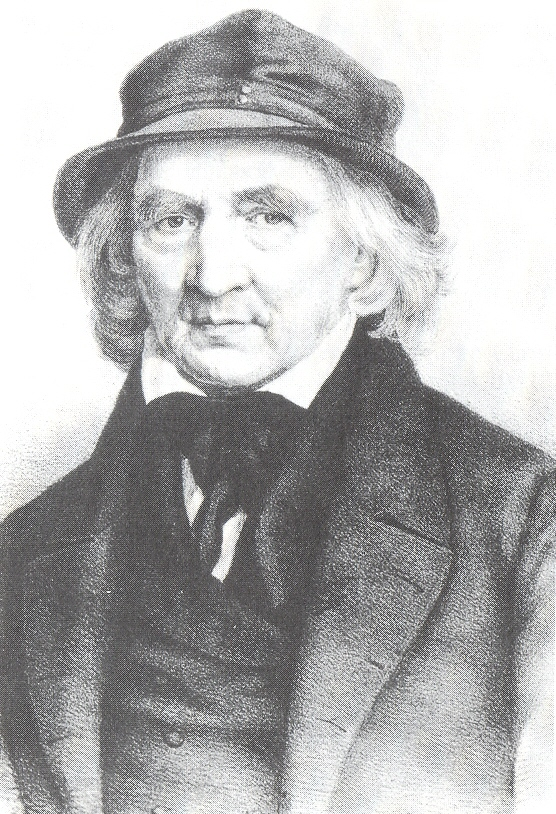
Johann Christian Jauch (1765–1855) Grand Burgher of the Free and Hanseatic City of Hamburg

In the mid-18th century, Carl Daniel Jauch (1714–1794) relocated the family's trading firm from the declining town of Lüneburg to Hamburg, the so-called "Queen of the Cities." Since the 17th century Hamburg played a unique role in Germany's economic history, emerging from the devastations of the Thirty Years' War as the wealthiest and most populous of all German cities, thanks in part to its strong fortifications.

At that time, Hamburg was a strictly bourgeois mercantile republic. The nobility had been formally excluded from the city since 1276, and there was no patrician class in the narrow legal sense as found in other Free Imperial Cities. Unlike the mediatised burghers in monarchically ruled towns governed by authoritarian structures, Hamburg's free citizens developed a civic culture closely tied to that of England. Though nominally a republic, Hamburg was not a democracy in the modern sense, but rather an oligarchy, governed exclusively by the Hanseaten, a small, purely bourgeois upper class that also existed in the sister republics of Bremen and Lübeck.

Between 1630 and 1650, these three cities formed what became known as the Hanseatic Community (German: Hanseatische Gemeinschaft), which succeeded the defunct Hanseatic League that had effectively dissolved at the beginning of the 17th century. It is therefore important to distinguish between the earlier Hanseatic merchants (German: Hansekaufleute) of the old League and the later Hanseaten as a socio-political class within the three Hanseatic republics.

By the late 18th century, the Jauch family had become part of this Hanseatic elite. Johann Christian Jauch senior (1765–1855), the last common ancestor of the present-day family, acquired the citizenship (Bürgerrecht) of the Free and Hanseatic City of Hamburg and was subsequently granted the hereditary grand burghership (German: Großbürgerrecht). August Jauch (1848–1930), a cavalry captain (Rittmeister), served for nearly two decades in the Hamburg Parliament until 1915—when he volunteered for military service in the Landwehr cavalry despite his age. He was one of the last members of Parliament to represent the grand burghers (German: Notabelnabgeordnete), a group appointed without direct election by the general burgherry.

The rule of the Hanseaten in Hamburg came to an end during the German Revolution of 1918–1919, when workers' and soldiers' councils took control of the city administration.

==== Land Owners in Hamburg, Lords of Manors in the Kingdom of Denmark ====
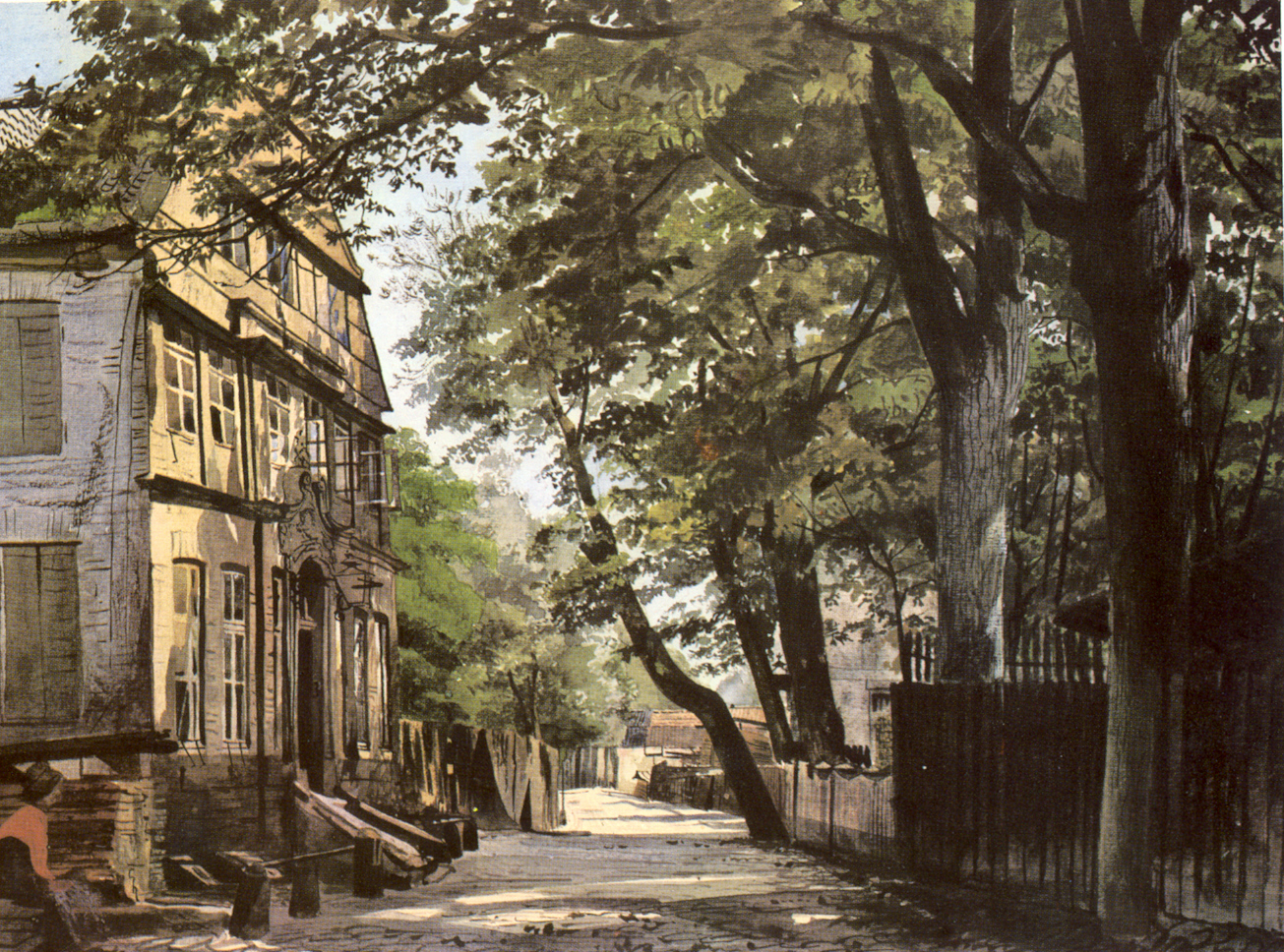
Stadtdeich 9 Hamburg

The family held extensive property along the Elbe River, adjacent to the historic timber harbour of Hamburg, with several houses located on the city's protective dyke Stadtdeich. Among these were the Baroque townhouse Stadtdeich No. 10 as well as the nearby properties Stadtdeich No. 3 and Stadtdeich an der Elbseite No. 159 (literally: "Stadtdeich on the Elbe side").

The house at Stadtdeich 10—occasionally also referenced as Stadtdeich 9—was designated a by the City of Hamburg protected cultural heritage site (Kulturdenkmal). It was destroyed at the end of July 1943 during Operation Gomorrah, the most devastating aerial bombing campaign in history at that time. British officials later referred to the destruction of Hamburg as “the Hiroshima of Germany.”

Destroyed along with this historical building were the family crypt on the former cemetery in Hamm, Hamburg (German: Alter Hammer Friedhof) and the Auguste Jauch Woman's Home for Needy Widows (German: Auguste-Jauch-Stift für bedürftige Witwen) located Bürgerweide 59 there.

Around the Outer Alster Lake the Jauch possessed the houses An der Alster 24, An der Alster 28 and Schwanenwik 18. In addition, they possessed country houses on the Bille in Reinbek and in the then popular garden suburb Hamm.

The regions surrounding Hamburg belonged to the Duchy of Holstein and were since 1713 territory of the Kingdom of Denmark, later Province of Schleswig-Holstein in the Kingdom of Prussia. Here became the property of the Jauch Wellingsbüttel Manor, Schönhagen Manor and Krummbek Manor and the estates Fernsicht and Marienhof on the Stör at Kellinghusen and Schwonendal in Karby, Schleswig-Holstein.

Today the Jauch own the Von Othegraven Winery. The manor house, its English garden and the vineyard Kanzemer Altenberg constitute a listed cultural heritage site. The manor house was heavily damaged at the end of the Second World War by the U.S. 10th Armored Division shooting from the other side of the Saar river. It was restored and enlarged between 1954 and 1956. According to Stuart Pigott von Othegraven Winery ″is one of the most beautiful properties″ in the region.

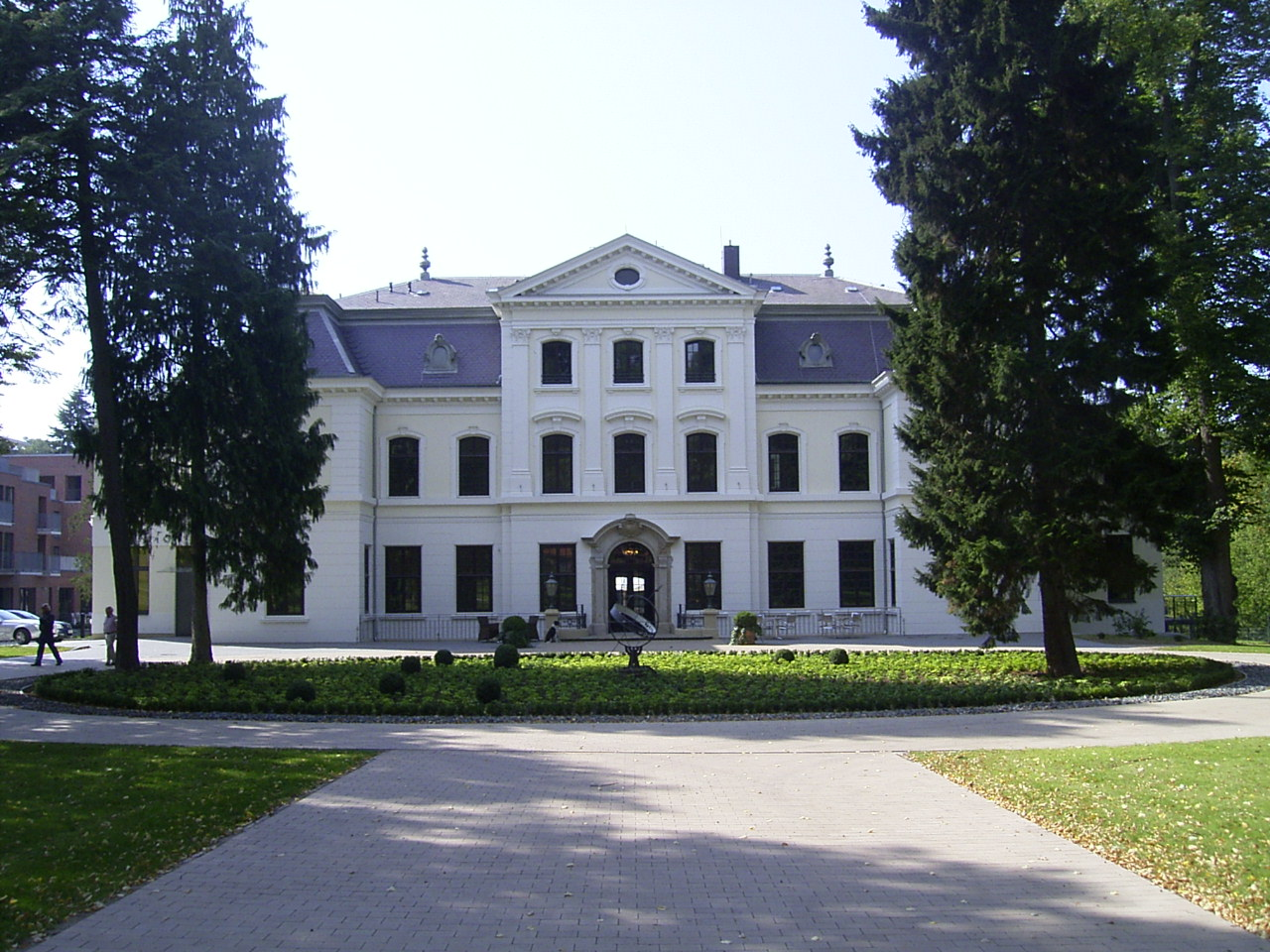
Wellingsbüttel Manor

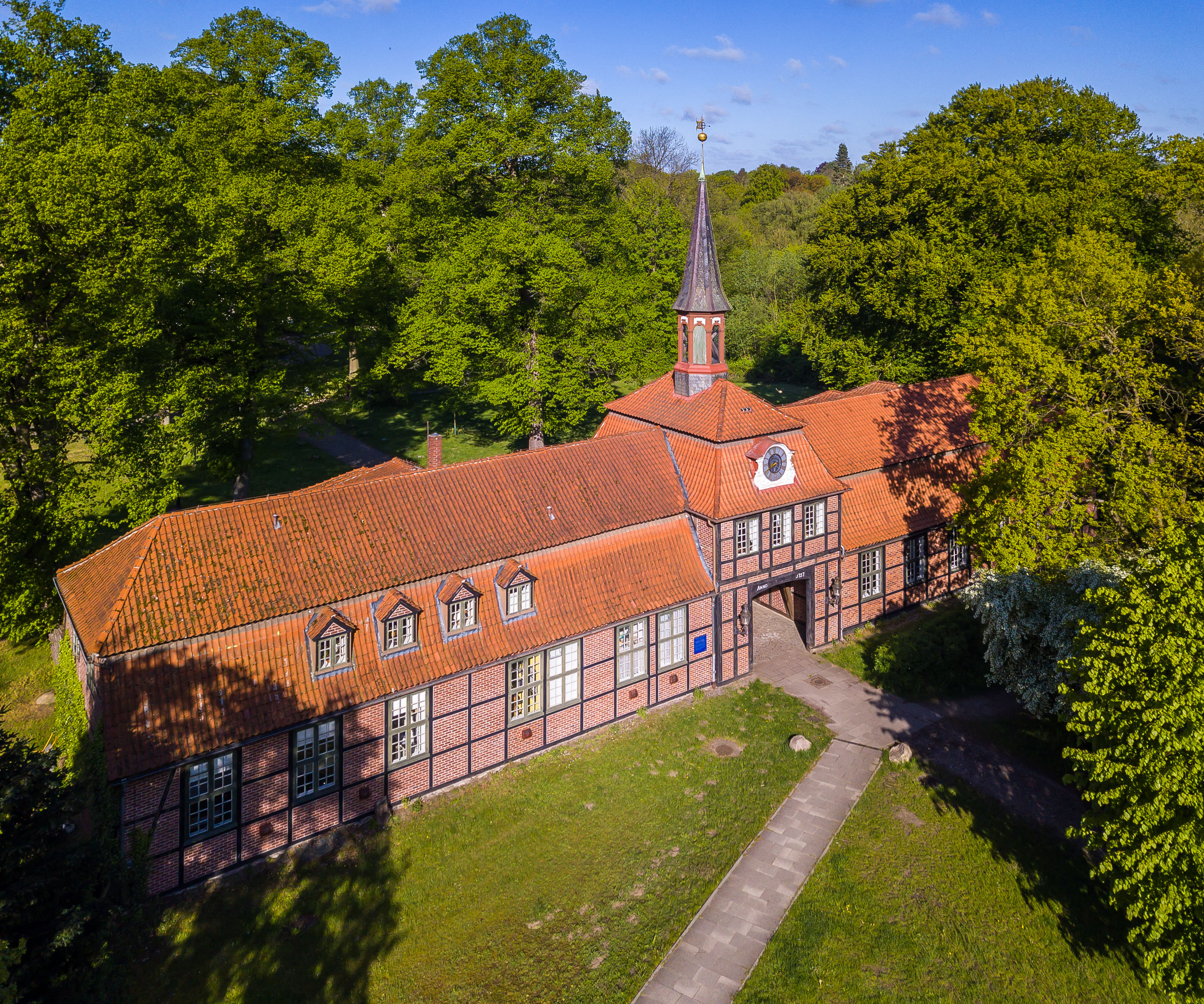
Gatehouse of Wellingsbüttel

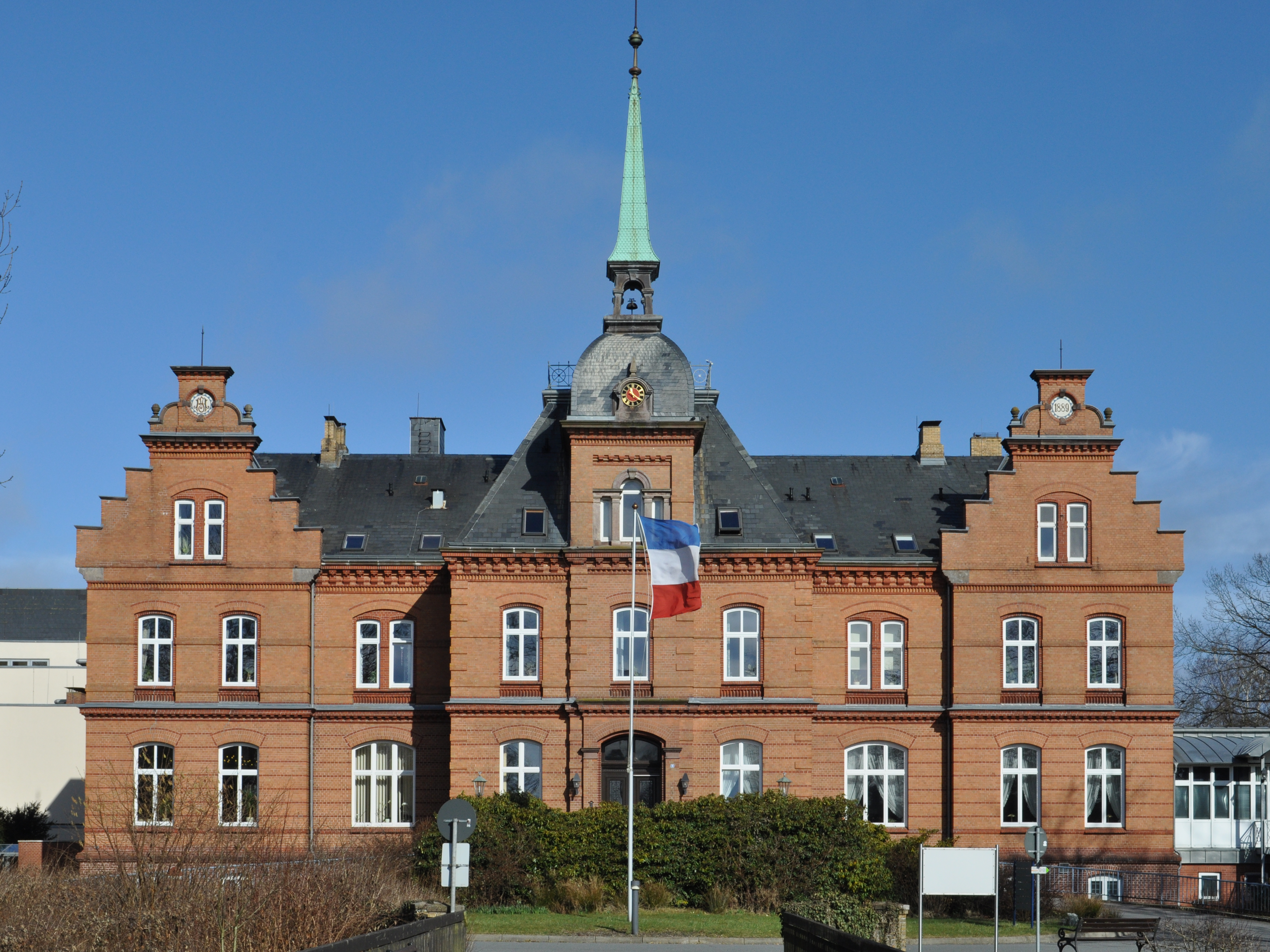
Schönhagen Manor

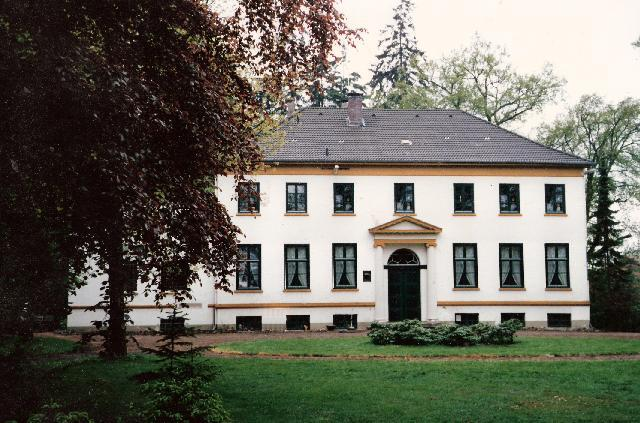
Krummbek Manor

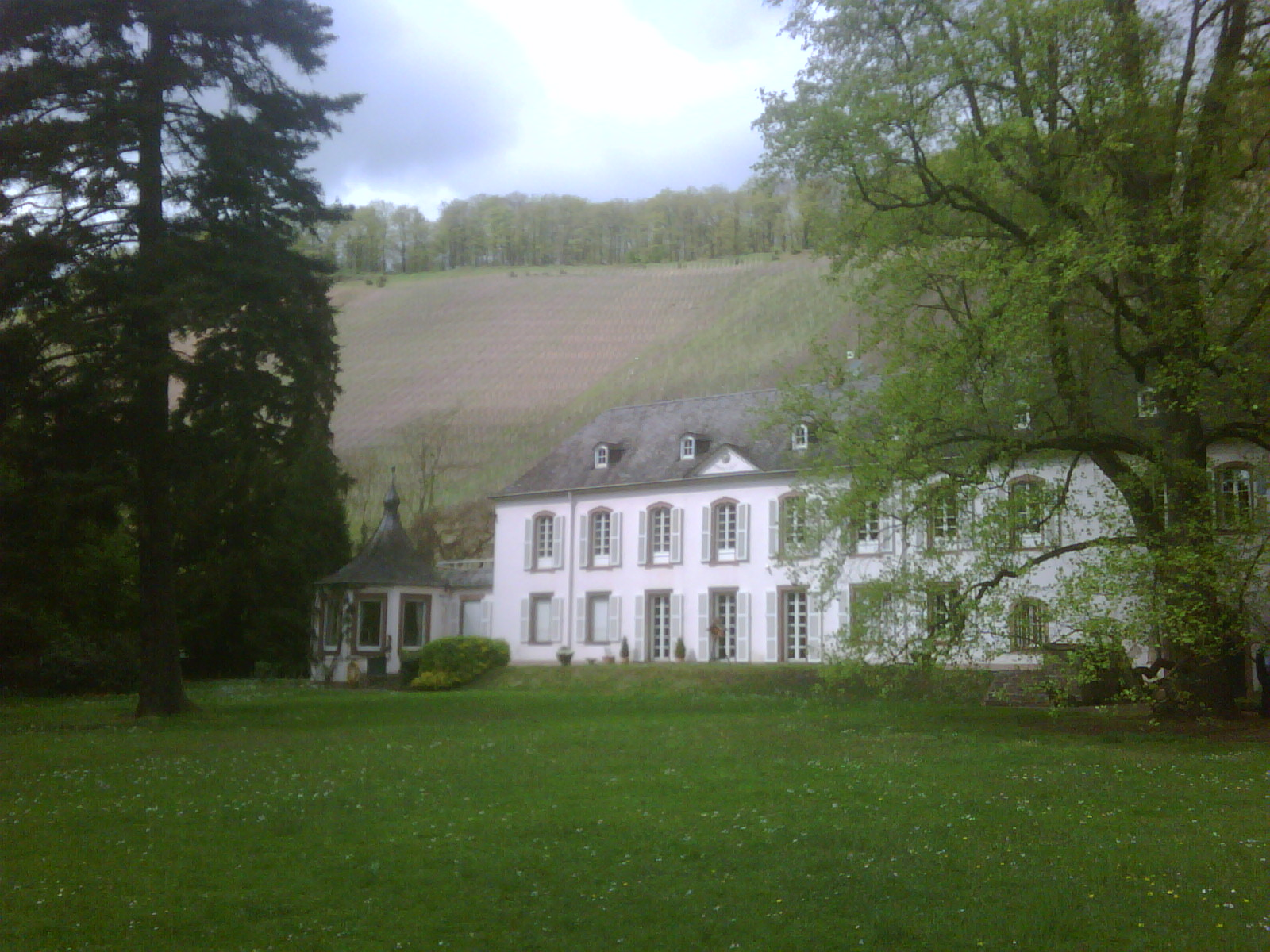
Weingut
von Othegraven

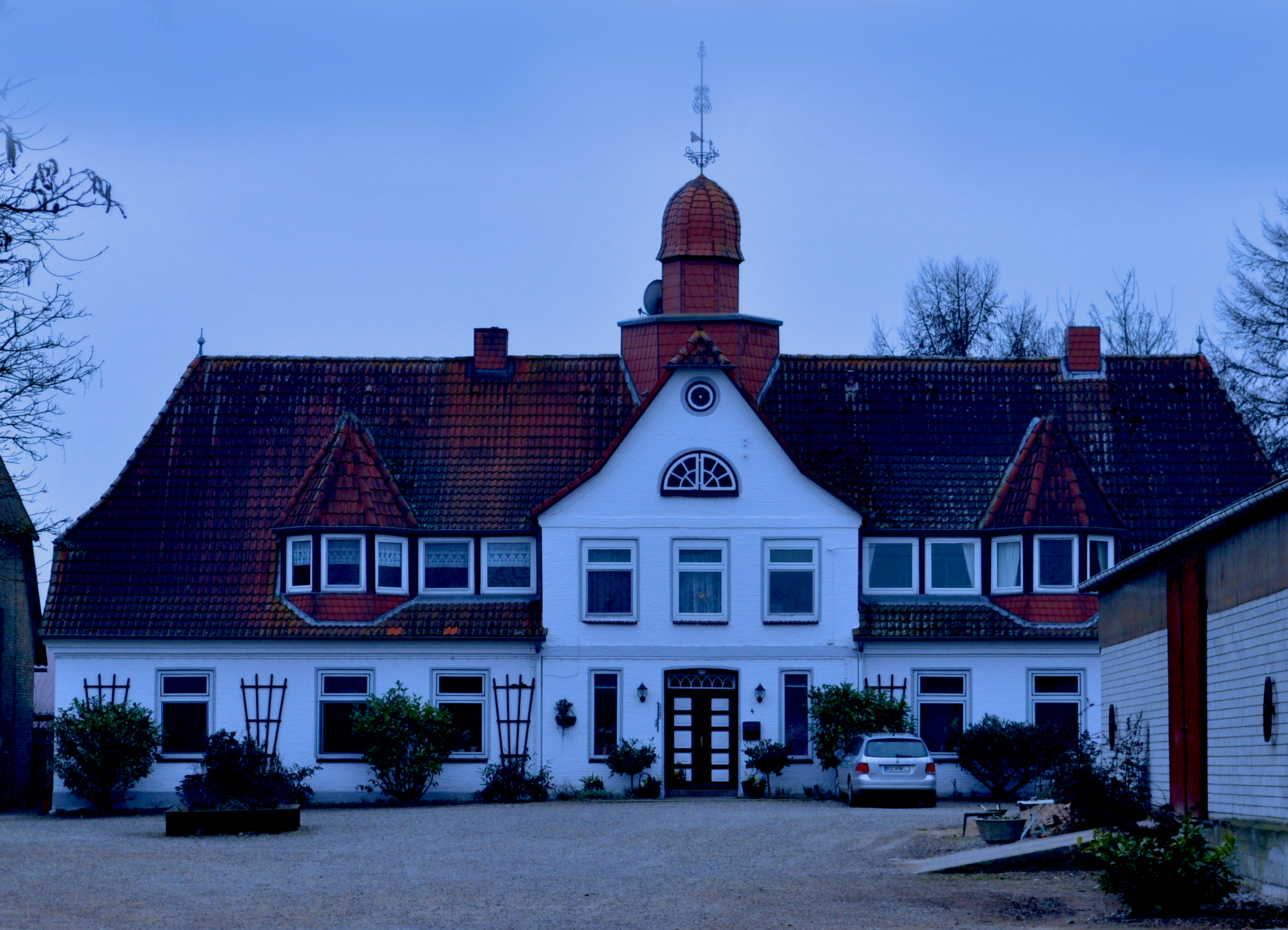
Schwonendal Estate

==== Notables in Hamburg self-government ====
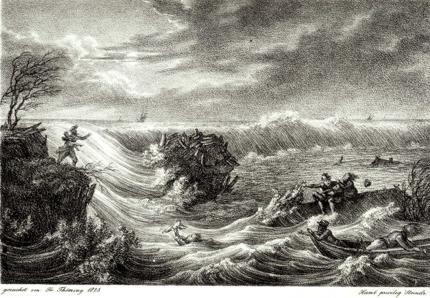
Dam failure in the February flood of 1825, Joh. Christ. Jauch sen. being first dyke count

While the commoners (German: Untertanen) of the landlocked Imperial States of the Holy Roman Empire were subject to bureaucracy and its civil officialdom (German: Beamtentum), Hamburg was marked by honorary self-government exercised by the most respected of its free citizens—the Hamburg notables (German: Hamburger Notabeln).

The Jauch mainly served as honorary almoners (German: Armenpfleger) for Hamburg’s General Institution for the Poor of 1788, as provisors of the Hamburg Reformatory, and as board members of their own and other humanitarian foundations. They were among the founders of the Humanitarian Aid for Borgfelde, Hamm and Horn (German: Hülfsverein für Borgfelde, Hamm und Horn), which supported poor residents not covered by municipal relief.

In keeping with the Hanseatic tradition of establishing humanitarian foundations, the Jauch maintained a daily soup kitchen (German: Armenspeisung) for the poor. They also built and maintained almshouses in Hamburg (German: Wohnstifte) and in Wellingsbüttel.

Johann Christian Jauch senior (1765–1855) served from 1820 to 1833 as dyke count and first dyke count (German: Ältester Deichgeschworener) of Hamburg-Hammerbrook. He was in office as first dyke count when the dam failed during the February flood of 1825, 2,000 feet southeast of the Jauch house at Stadtdeich 10 in Hamburg.

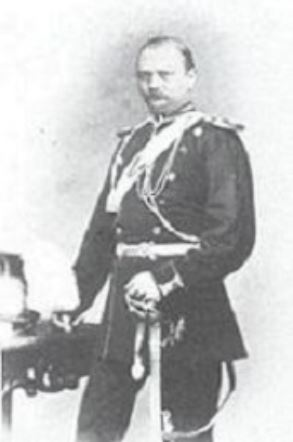
Carl Jauch (1828–88)

==== Cavalry Officers in the Hamburg Citizen Militia ====
In the Hamburg Citizen Militia the social class and the wealth of the individual predetermined the branch of his service and his military rank – which was the opposite of the Royal Prussian Army where the officer rank made the individual a member of the upper class of society. The most prestigious citizens served as officers in the militia.

The service in the cavalry was generally a badge of high-ranking social status not least because of the high costs caused by maintaining the cavalry horses and the keeping of a groom which had to be borne by each cavalryman himself. All metal parts of a cavalry officer uniform had to be gilded. For these reasons the Hanseatic cavalry was the stomping ground for the grand burghers.

The conscripted members of the family performed their service in the militia as first lieutenants in the cavalry under the cavalry commanders Rittmeister (English: captain of the cavalry) Ernst Merck and later Rittmeister Adolph Godeffroy.

==== Ancestors from the Time of the Hanseatic League ====
Among the ancestors of the Hamburg branch of the family are several First Mayors of the city-state of Hamburg, historically equivalent to a sovereign head of state. One of these is Johann Wetken (1470–1538) who was the head of the Lutherans in Hamburg, implemented the Protestant Reformation and became the first evangelical mayor of the city.

==== Progeny ====
Eleonora Maria Jauch (1732–1797) is the ancestress of the Lübeck Hanseatic Overbeck family to which belong her son the burgomaster (head of state) Christian Adolph Overbeck and her grandson the painter and head of the Nazarene movement Friedrich Overbeck.

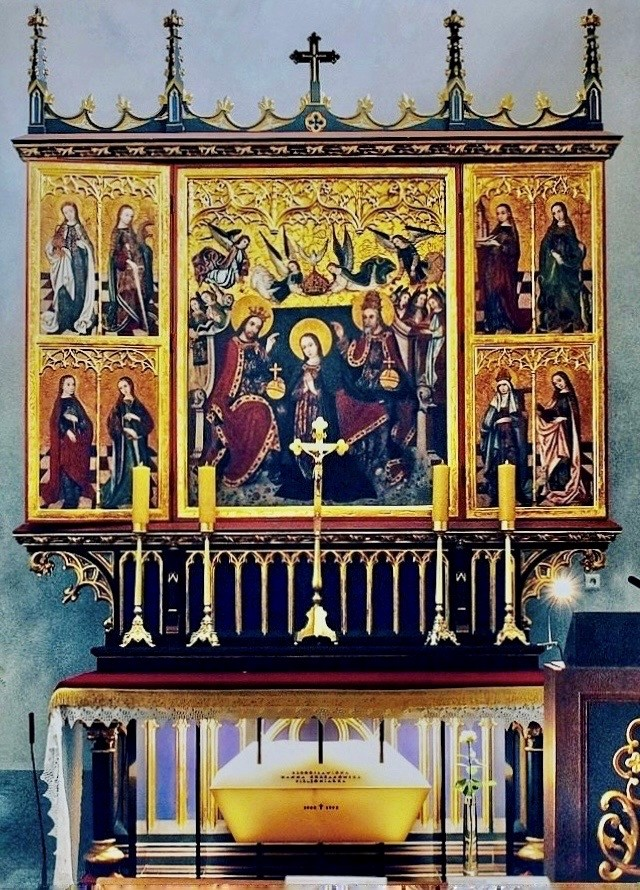
Shrine of the blessed Hanna Chrzanowska

Other offspring of the Jauch are the Blessed Hanna Chrzanowska, the Nobel Prize-winning novelist Henryk Sienkiewicz, the first International German Golf Champion Alice Knoop, the Barons Bolton, owners of the extinct duchy Bolton, branches of Magnates of Poland as the Princes Czartoryski and the Counts Potocki, as well as branches of the Princes Podhorski and the Princes Woroniecki.

Constance Jauch (1722–1802) is the ancestress of the Polish noble Lelewel family which was granted the indygenat by the sejm. Her son Karol Mauricy Lelewel, godson of King Augustus III of Poland, belongs to the fathers of the Constitution of May 3, 1791 which is regarded to be the first modern constitution of Europe, grown out of the spirit of Polish Enlightenment. The Polish historian and rebel Joachim Lelewel (1786–1861), grandson of Constance Jauch, was creator of Poland's unofficial motto "For our freedom and yours". He was member of Poland's Provisional Government in the November Uprising 1830. Czar Nicholas I was dethroned in 1831 as King of Poland under his leadership as president of the radical Patriotic Club. His brother Lieutenant Colonel Jan Pawel Lelewel (1796–1847) participated on 3 April 1833 in the Frankfurter Wachensturm, the attempt to start a revolution in all German states.

Colonel Albert Deetz (1798–1859), son of Ludovica Jauch (1772–1805), was one of the thirtytwo members of the Emperor Deputation on 3 April 1849 which offered Frederick William IV of Prussia the office of emperor. Lieutenant general of the Waffen-SS Karl Fischer von Treuenfeld, descendant of Eleonora Maria Jauch (1732–1797), was a close friend of Erich Ludendorff and one of the leading figures of the Beer Hall Putsch in 1923, a failed attempt by Adolf Hitler, to seize power in Germany. Charlotte Jauch's (1811–1872) grandson Otto von Feldmann (1873–1945) was policy officer of Paul von Hindenburg and in charge of the campaign by which Hindenburg became President of Germany in 1925.

== History ==
=== Origins in Sulza ===
1512 Georg, Matthias and Nikolaus Jauch were registered as propertied men (German: Besessene Männer) in Bergsulza. Matthias Jauch Jauch there was enfeoffed by the sovereign with the Segelitz estate. Georg Jauch (1606–1675) was burgomaster of Sulza.

=== In Attendance on the Grand Ducal House of Mecklenburg ===
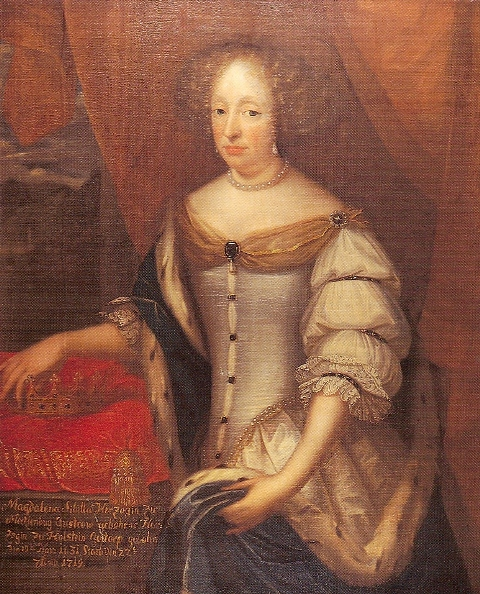
Magdalene Sibylle of Holstein-Gottorp (1631–1719), whose lady's-maid and confidant Ingborg Jauch was

In the 17th century Sulza has been twice devastated, 1613 by the Thuringian Flood and 1640 when it was plundered by Swedish troops. Johann Christian Jauch the Elder (1638–1718) left the fallen back Sulza and relocated to Güstrow where he entered 1662 the service of the Grand Ducal House of Mecklenburg at its residence Güstrow Castle. He was a member of the ducal household of Magdalena Sibylle, née Duchess of Schleswig-Holstein-Gottorf, wife of Gustav Adolph, Duke of Mecklenburg-Güstrow, until he became 1669 First Valet de chambre (German: Erster Lacquay und Taffeldecker) of Crown Prince Carl of Mecklenburg-Güstrow. 1665 he married Ingborg Nicolai (†1696), who had come to Güstrow with the duchess Magdalena Sibylle from Gottorf Castle, serving her as lady's maid and confidant. The social rank of a servant at these times mirrored the lordship − the higher the lordship, the better the opportunities for the servant to reach a prestigious position himself. A ducal valet de chambre ranked in Mecklenburg-Güstrow equal to The Very Reverend, thus allowing the lordship to demonstrate its own rank. Suitably the first daughters of Johann Christian and Ingborg Jauch married members of the nobility.

In 1688, Crown Prince Carl died without a male heir. Johann Christian Jauch the Elder quit the service and became burgher of the city of Güstrow, dealing at retail and being a court shoemaker, purveyor to the ducal family. His eldest son Johann Christopher Jauch (1669–1725) had been a stipendiary of the duke and carried out since the end of 1694 the function of a court chaplain (German: Hof- und Schlossprediger). After the death of the last Duke of Mecklenburg-Güstrow, Gustav Adolph, in 1695 the dukedom of Mecklenburg-Güstrow became extinct. Though duchess Magdalena Sibylla maintained a small court until 1718 the residence Güstrow lost its splendour and relevance. Moreover, Ingborg Jauch had already died. Therefore, almost all family members left Güstrow 1696 and turned to Lüneburg.

=== In Attendance on the House of Hanover ===
1701 the Jauchs became burghers of Lüneburg. At Lüneburg Johann Christopher Jauch (1669–1725) was Royal British and Electoral Brunswick-Lüneburg Dean of the Lutheran churches (German: Königlich Großbritannischer und Kurfürstlich Braunschweig-Lüneburgischer Stadtsuperintendent) at St. John's Church, Lüneburg, while Johann Christian Jauch (1702–1778) became canon, 1754 subsenior collegii canonici, 1760 The Very Reverend (German: Erster Domherr) and vice-dean (German: Vizedekan) with the function of a provost of the Lutheran cathedral of Bardowick. He married Clara Maria Rhüden (1710–1775), who was a great-great-grandchild of the Lutheran theologian of the Protestant Reformation Salomon Gesner (1559–1605), thereby ancestor of all later Jauchs, son of deacon Paul Gesner, who was taught by Martin Luther and consecrated by Johannes Bugenhagen. Her great-great-grandfather, the professor of philosophy at Hamburg, Bernhard Werenberg (1577–1643), has been an opponent to the noted scientist Joachim Jungius at the same place. Her uncle was the predecessor of Johann Christopher Jauch and great-grandson of Philipp Melanchthon Heinrich Jonathan Werenberg (1651–1713). Ludolph Friedrich Jauch (1698–1764), son of the dean Johann Christopher Jauch, was Senior Pastor of Lüneburg's St. Michael's Church (German: Michaeliskirche), his brother Tobias Christoph Jauch (1703–1776), was a legal practitioner and deputy (German: Stadt−Secretarius), member of the municipal council (German: Magistrat) of Lüneburg. Carl Jauch (1735–1818) was Royal British and Electoral Brunswick-Lüneburg judge of the castle court of justice (German: Burggerichtsverwalter) in Horneburg and canon of the Cathedral of Bardowick, Friedrich August Jauch (1741–1796), son of the imperial civil law notary Adolph Jauch (1705–1758), was senator and police governor of the city of Hannover.

Carl Jauch (1680–1755), merchant in Lüneburg, has been a supporter of the theologian, alchemist and physician Johann Konrad Dippel, by some authors debatably claimed to be the model for Mary Shelley's novel Frankenstein. After Dippel's expulsion from Denmark 1727 Carl Jauch gave shelter to the refugee who was 1729 expelled from Lüneburg, too. Carl Jauch was married to a grandniece of the Lübeck dean August Pfeiffer (1640–1698), who strongly influenced the faith and the thinking of Johann Sebastian Bach.

Eleonora Maria Jauch's (1732–1797) father-in-law was the dean of Bardowick Caspar Nicolaus Overbeck, in whose foster-parental home August Hermann Francke 1687 had been guest when he experienced his so-called "Lüneburg conversion" (German: Lüneburger Bekehrung), making him one of the earliest leaders of Pietism.

=== In Attendance on the Electors of Saxony and Kings of Poland ===
1698 Johann Christopher Jauch adjourned his function in Lüneburg and served as court chaplain for Christiane Eberhardine of Brandenburg-Bayreuth, queen consort of Poland and grand duchess consort of Lithuania during her cure at Pretzsch, encouraging her to keep at her Lutheran faith after the conversion of her husband to Catholicism. Christiane Eberhardine later was named by her Protestant countrymen "The Praying Pillar of Saxony" (German: Die Betsäule Sachsens)

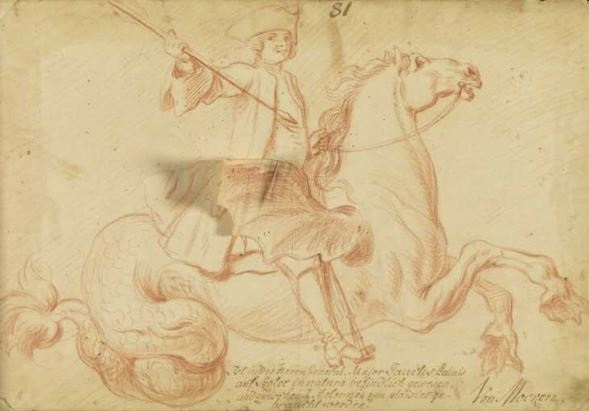
Winged Hippocampus at Palais Jauch, Warsaw

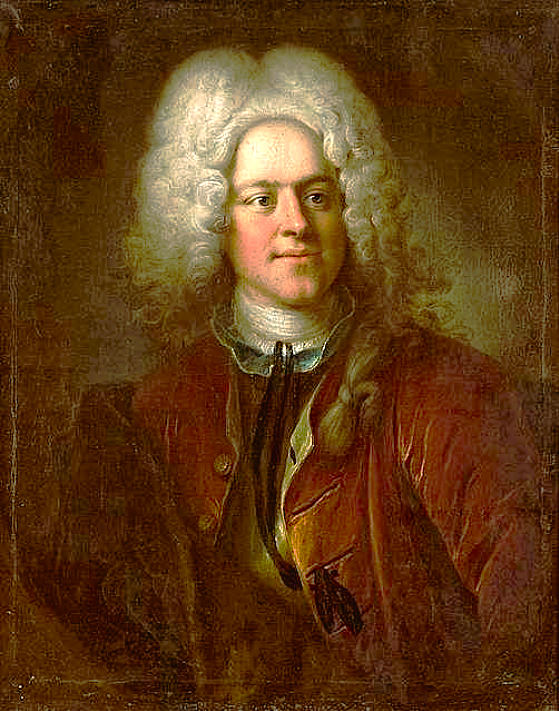
Joachim Daniel Jauch (1688–1754) Elect. Sax. Major General Royal Polish Colonel

His brother Joachim Daniel (1688–1754) served at first in the army of the Republic of the Seven United Netherlands, before he changed 1705 as lieutenant into the Saxon army. He took part as a captain in the first siege of Stralsund 1711–12 during the Great Northern War. At the end he was contemporaneously royal Polish colonel (since 1736), electoral Saxon major general (since 1746), superintendent of the Saxon building authority in Poland (since 1721), with the title director (since 1736), remunerated for each function separately. His primary obligation was to supervise the baroque development of the city of Warsaw. Vital was his responsibility for the extensive merrymakings of the Saxon court at Warsaw.

When 1730 at the end of tremendous fireworks at Zeithain which lasted for five hours, instead of the correct "VIVAT" in front of 48 foreign princes and numerous other lords a mistake in writing occurred and a "FIFAT" was illuminated, he gained his cognomen "Fifat". He erected the Palais Jauch in Warsaw's suburb Solec and was architect for a number of prominent baroque buildings in Poland.

He married Eva Maria Münnich, said to be the daughter of the later Russian field marshal Burkhard Christoph Count von Münnich (1683–1767), his predecessor as superintendent of the Saxon building authority. His son August von Jauch (b. 1731) was godson of King Augustus II the Strong. The elaborate cradle endowed to his parents by the king, later the cradle for Joachim Lelewel, is exhibited in the National Museum, Kraków. Joachim Daniel Jauch is buried in the Capuchins Church in the Miodowa in Warsaw.

Some members of the family followed Major General Joachim Daniel von Jauch (1688–1754) as officers into the Saxon and Polish army, two of them, Franz Georg Jauch (b. 1681) and Heinrich Georg Jauch (b. 1709), serving as lieutenant colonels – colonels in relation to the other regiments (German: Linienregimenter) – in the Royal Guard of King Augustus II the Strong and King Augustus III of Poland. Franz Georg Jauch 1724 was participating as a captain in the Blood-Bath of Thorn, commanding a company of the Royal Polish Foot Guards Regiment.

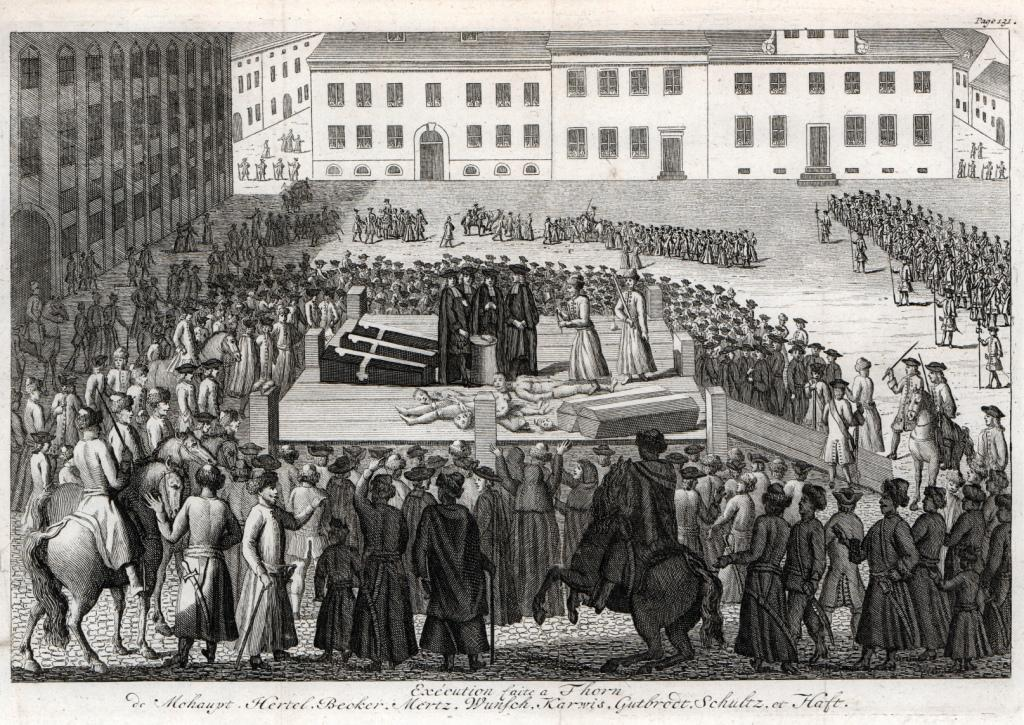
Blood-Bath of Thorn on 7 December 1724 Franz Georg Jauch being at the time captain in the Royal Polish Foot Guards Regiment formed up on the right side

=== Grand Burghers of the Free and Hanseatic City of Hamburg ===
1699 Franz Jürgen Jauch and his brother Christian Jauch the Younger († 1720) served an apprenticeship as merchant in Hamburg. 1752 the merchant Joachim Daniel Jauch (1714–1795) moved his business from Lüneburg to Hamburg. Lt. Johann Georg Jauch (1727–1799) kidnapped 1754 Anna Mutzenbecher, daughter of the Secretary of State of Hamburg Magnifizenz Johann Baptista Mutzenbecher (1691–1759), member of one of Hamburg's leading families and married her. Under Johann Christian Jauch senior (1765–1855), son of Johann Georg Jauch, the Jauchs became the most important and wealthiest wood traders of Hamburg who reached grand burghership status of the town. Thus, they became members of the ruling class, the Hanseatics (Hanseaten) in one of the wealthiest cities of Germany, with whose financial capacity only Vienna could compete because of the local high nobility concentrating there and its wealth.

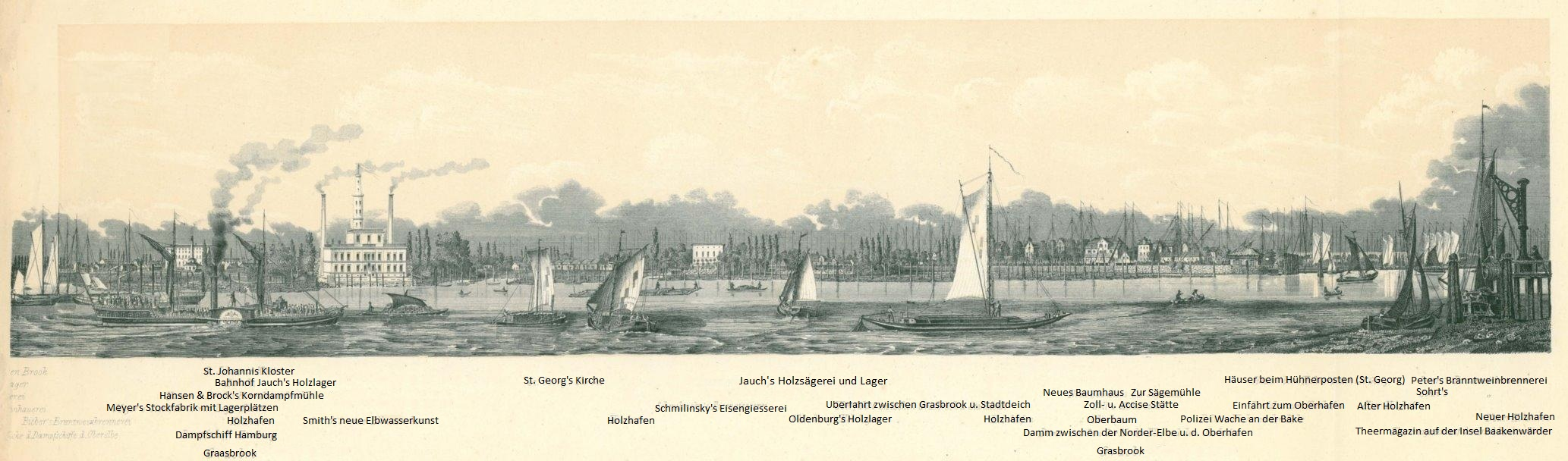
The Old Timber Harbour (German: Alter Holzhafen), part of the Port of Hamburg c. 1840
(a) Jauch's timber yard in the Elbe (German: Jauch's Holzlager) on the left,
(b) Jauch's sawmill on the riverbank and another timber yard (German: Jauch's Holzsägerei und Lager) in the center,
(c) a timber raft drifting down the Elbe in the middle left background bringing wood to Jauch

Christian Jauch senior's sons were founders of the three still existing branches of the family: Wellingsbüttel, Schönhagen und Fernsicht. His great-grandnephew was Ludwig Gümbel (1874–1923), naval architect and significant for the upgrowth of submarines in World War I, cousin of first president of the Federal Republic of Germany Theodor Heuss.

His eldest son Johann Christian Jauch junior (1802–1880) acquired the Manor house Wellingsbüttel, previously domicile of the penultimate Duke of Schleswig-Holstein-Sonderburg-Beck, Friedrich Karl Ludwig, ancestor of the modern-day British royal family. In addition to his land he leased the Duvenstedt Carr for hunting, which is today Hamburg's largest nature reserve. Alongside his home in Hamburg he erected a deer park and a cage for the bears he brought with himself from his voyages to Russia. The poet Hebbel wrote to his long-time companion Elise Lensing, who had lived for many years in the house Stadtdeich 43, after she moved out:

It can only calm me to know that you are no longer under cats, snakes and bears like on the Stadtdeich, but under human beings.

— Christian Friedrich Hebbel

1863 he was a patron of the international agricultural exhibition on the Heiligengeistfeld.

His son Carl Jauch (1828–1888) was Lord of Wellingsbüttel, too. He married Louise von Plessen (1827–1875), daughter of the Grand Ducal Mecklenburg Governor (Großherzoglich Mecklenburgischen Oberlanddrost) Ulrich von Plessen und great-granddaughter of Baron (Reichsfreiherr) Seneca von Gelting (1715–1786), who was married to a niece of Johannes Thedens and had become highly wealthy as chargé d'affaires of the Dutch East India Company in Cirebon. His grandfather Diederich Brodersen (1640–1717), ancestor of today's Jauchs of the Wellingsbüttel branch is also an ancestor to the composer Johannes Brahms. Because of this marriage the earliest notable ancestor is Helmoldus I de Huckelem, documented 1097 and connecting the Wellingsbüttel branch to numerous prominent other descendants of inter alia the von Plessen, von Moltke und von Oertzen families.

Auguste Jauch (1822–1902) was one of the well known benefactors to the poor of Hamburg. Colonel Hans Jauch (1883–1965), Commander of the Freikorps "Jauch", took part in putting down communist uprisings in 1920 and is founder of the Roman Catholic branch of the family.

Luise Jauch (1885–1933) was head nurse at The Magic Mountain at Davos, the second famous novel of Thomas Mann, when his wife Katia Mann stood there 1912. Luise Jauch's traits have been utilized for the novel's head nurse Adritacia von Mylendonk.

In different polls Günther Jauch (b. 1956) was elected as “Most intelligent German” (2002), “Most wanted TV-star to become politician” (2003) and “Most popular German” (2005). He was awarded in 2001 the World Award for entertainment. Since 2008 his sculpture is part of Madame Tussauds wax museum at Berlin.

=== Major Landowners in Guatemala ===
In Guatemala the coffee business was from the beginning in the hand of German investors. ″The US government forced the Guatemalan government to confiscate the German coffee holdings and to arrest German citizens. This allowed US companies to take control of the Guatemalan coffee industry.″

The plantation Armenia Lorena and other coffee plantations of the Jauch nearby San Rafael Pie de la Cuesta in Guatemala were under severe pressure of the US government seized by the Guatemalan government in the Second World War and expropriated without compensation in 1953.

=== In the Times of the Third Reich ===
==== Heinrich Jauch, First State Attorney at Hamburg ====
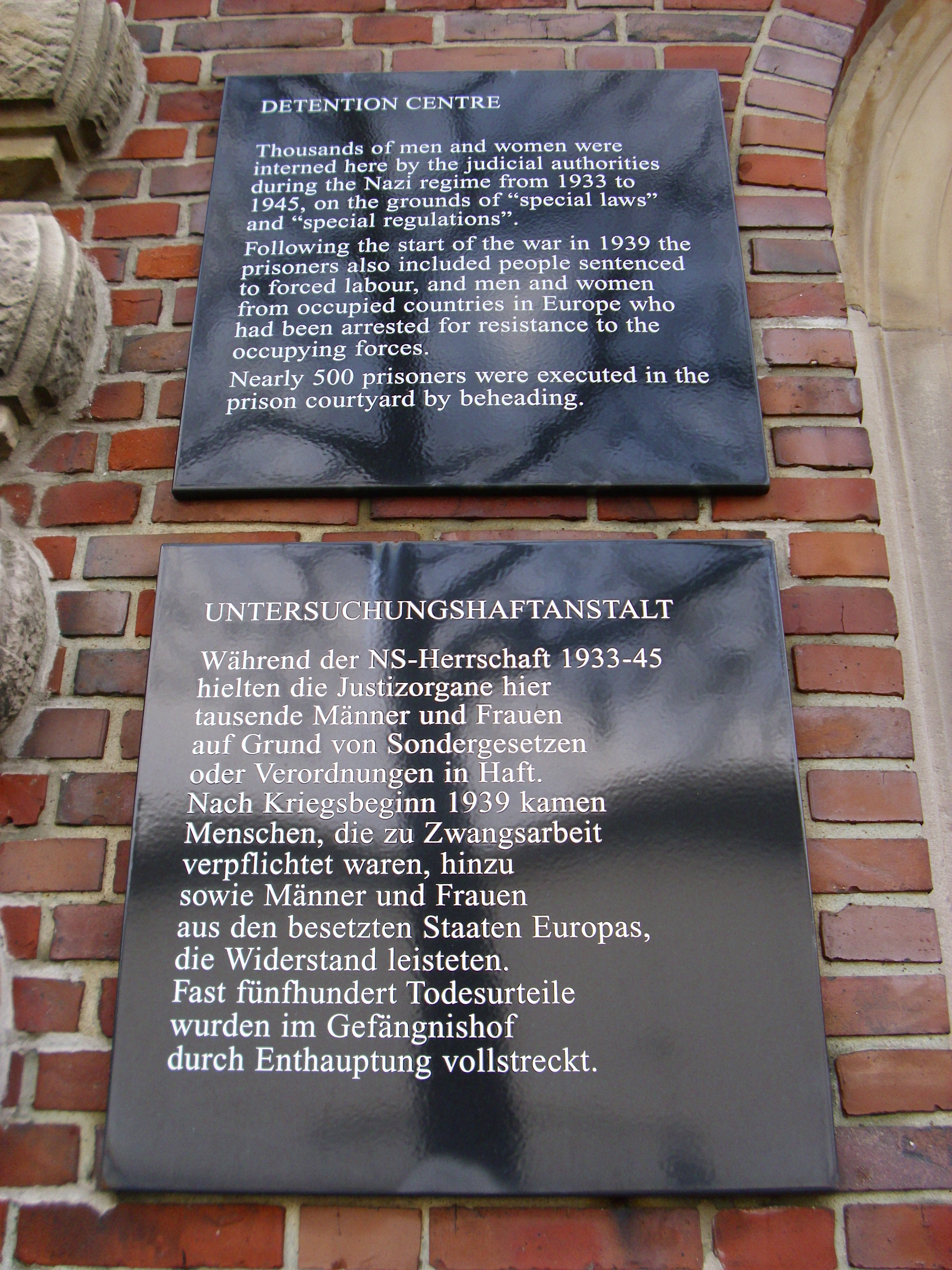
Commemorative plaque in memory of those who were beheaded in Hamburg's central place of execution, the remand prison at the Holstenglacis

Heinrich Jauch (1894–1945) was the Prosecuting Attorney of the Special Tribunal (German: Sondergericht) Hamburg in the criminal trial against the Soviet agent during the interwar period Jan Valtin and 52 other defendants of whom nine were condemned to death. Jauch crushed with this trial the Red Navy (German: Rote Marine) Hamburg. Valtin reports in his biography “Out of the Night”, the US-bestseller of 1941 and the TIME “Book of the Year”, the trial and the executions:

Day after day we sat on the prisoners' benches, a cadaverous crew of outcasts surrounded by all the symbols of Hitler power. The Prosecuting Attorney, a tall, thin, pale-faced man named Jauch, dominated the hearings. His hatred for us was undisguised. His eyes flashed and his lips drew back in snarls as he demanded death, and nothing but death.

— Jan Valtin, Out of the Night

The trial is regarded to be the model for the Moscow Trials which were a series of three show trials held in the Soviet Union at the instigation of Joseph Stalin between 1936 and 1938. I these trials Stalin got rid of most of the surviving Old Bolsheviks, as well as the former leadership of the Soviet secret police. In addition, it is believed that Heinrich Jauch has won the majority of the death sentences in Hamburg bevor he was called to Berlin.

The first who were sentenced to death were executed on 19 May 1934. Formerly a guillotine had been used, but it had been discarded as a French method of decapitation. Since then people were put to death with an executioner's ax.

There were the judges of the Special Tribunal and Prosecutor Jauch, all wearing cutaways and topheads. ... They were followed by a long train of storm troop officers and Elite Guards. ... Last to come was the headsman, a chunky individual with a big-boned face and dull brown eyes. He showed complete emotional indifference to the task ahead of him. He, too, wore a stiff white shirt, striped trousers, a cutaway and a top head. ... the headsman raised his ax over comrade Dettmer's head. He did not strike. He simply let it fall on Johnny's neck. Then, with an easy motion, he drew the blade toward him, and stepped back. Johnny Dettmer's head fell into the basket.

— Jan Valtin, Out of the Night

The executions under the direction of Heinrich Jauch became, entwined with the events of the Altona Bloody Sunday, the literary model for a novel and two films. The novelist Arnold Zweig read in 1938 in a newspaper in Haifa the mistaken information that Dettmer and others had been executed by a master butcher named Fock who after a couple of months had committed suicide. Zweig made literary use of the beheadings and the alleged fate of the headsman and published 1943 the novel Das Beil von Wandsbek (The axe of Wandsbek). 1951 an East German film script, The Axe of Wandsbek was adapted from the novel followed by the West German film Das Beil von Wandsbek (1982). In memory of Jonny Dettmer a Stolperstein was set into the ground in front of the house where he lived in Hamburg-Eilbek.

In 1937 Heinrich Jauch brought the charge against Arnold Bernstein a shipowner and pioneer of transatlantic car transport. Bernstein was imprisoned on charges of foreign exchange offenses. At the time of his arrest, he was the owner of one of the largest Jewish businesses in Germany. The company was confiscated without compensation and after an additional payment of $30,000 in U.S. currency, Bernstein was allowed to leave Germany. The show trial is regarded to be the first major Aryanization of Jewish property.

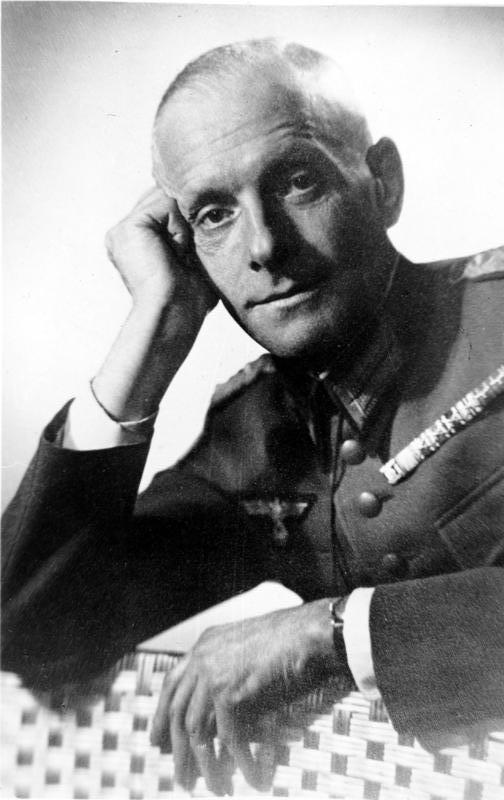
Hans Oster Cousin of Walter Jauch, one of the leaders of the German resistance, executed 1945, supported by Jauch & Hübener

Similarly, Heinrich Jauch organized that the Nazi state reached control over the trading firm Alfred C. Toepfer Company owned by Alfred Toepfer. He arrested Toepfer on charges of foreign exchange offenses between 1937 and 1938 until Toepfer gave up control over his firm.

==== Jauch & Hübener and the German Resistance to Nazism ====
Major General Hans Oster (1887–1945), one of the earliest and most determined opponents of Adolf Hitler and Nazism, moving spirit of German resistance from 1938 to 1943, was a first cousin-in-law of Rittmeister (English: captain of the cavalry) Walter Jauch (1888–1976). Walter Jauch was the founder of Jauch & Hübener, who were at the beginning of the Second World War the largest insurance broker in continental Europe. In the Oster Conspiracy Oster planned already in 1938 to assassinate German dictator Adolf Hitler, the leader of Nazi Germany. Oster and his opposition group including Hans von Dohnányi were supported by Jauch & Hübener, today's German branch of Aon Corporation. Walter Jauch's co-founder Otto Hübener was arrested 1945 in Hamburg and hanged in late April 1945 without trial, a few days before the end of Nazi Germany.

==== Robert Jauch, officer commanding in the battle of Stalingrad ====
Robert Jauch (1913–2000) fought as an officer, almost as an artillery observer (German: Vorgeschobener Beobachter (VB)), ultimately as first lieutenant and officer commanding (OC) of an artillery battery of the Panzer-Artillerieregiment 16, part of the 16. Panzer-Division, in a number of major battles, including the Battle of France, the Battle of Kiev (1941), the First Battle of Kharkov and the Battle of Kalach. In 1942–1943 he took part in the Battle of Stalingrad. Of about 400,000 German casualties during the battle about 150,000 fell in the "Cauldron" of Stalingrad itself. The surviving nearly 110,000 Germans of which 2,500 were officers were captured in Stalingrad. Among those was Robert Jauch, who surrendered on his thirtieth birthday, the 2 February 1943. Out of the 110,000 survivors only about 5,000 ever returned from Russia. Robert Jauch became a member of the League of German Officers (German: Bund Deutscher Offiziere) (BDO), an anti-Nazi organization. He came back to Germany after seven years as a prisoner of war in Yelabuga, Kuibishev and Simferopol as one of the ″late homecomers″ (German: Spätheimkehrer) in 1950.

==== Casualties of World War I and World War II ====
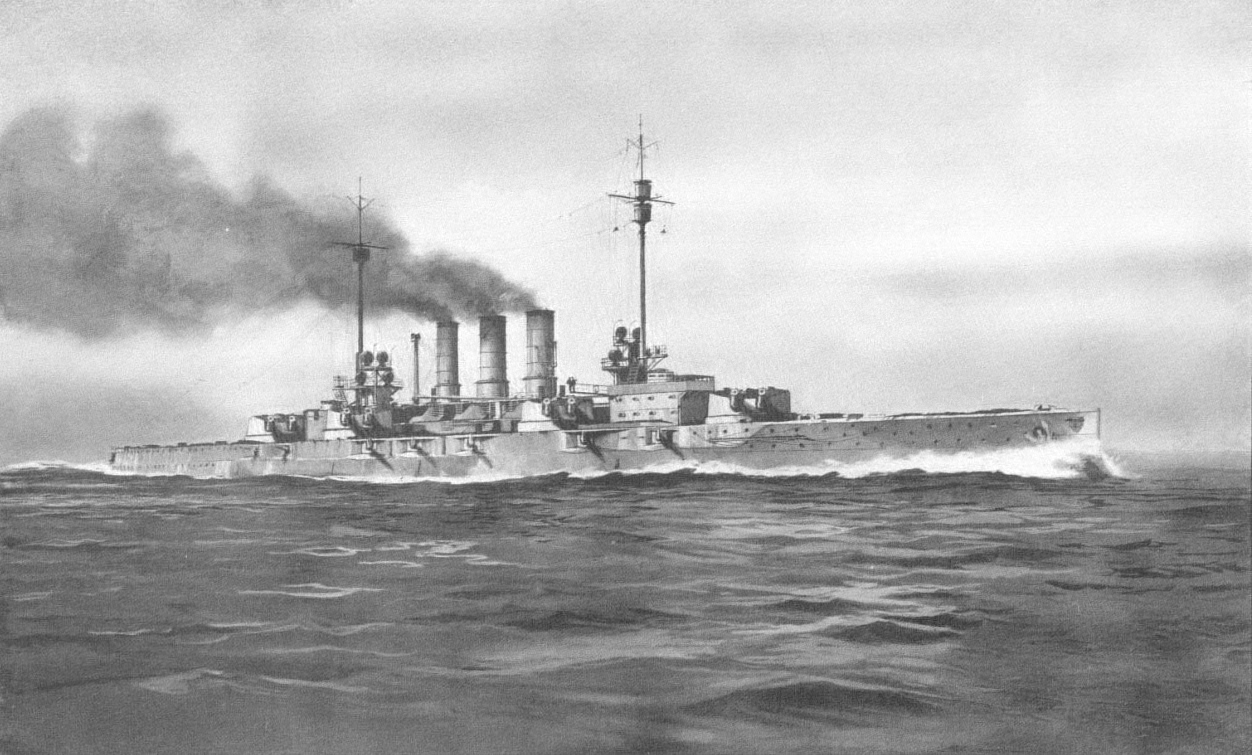
SMS Thüringen on which Rudolf Jauch served as an officer cadet

Eight lineage holders of the Jauch, half of all lineage holders in these generations, died as soldiers on the different European battlefields of the First World War and the Second World War, seven of them killed in action. They all with only one exception had no descendants.

Lt. Rudolf Jauch (1891–1915) died 1915 in the sinking of the submarine U-40 by the submarine HMS C24, cooperating with the decoy-ship Taranki. It was the first U-boot trap victory by the British Royal Navy during the First World War. The Distinguished Service Cross which has been awarded for this action to Commander Captain Frederick Henry Taylor is part of the collection of the National Maritime Museum at Greenwich. The wreck was discovered a hundred years later approximately 40 nmi (74 km; 46 mi) off Eyemouth, Berwickshire, Scotland. It is placed as a controlled site under the Protection of Military Remains Act 1986. – Since their joint training als officer cadets on SMS Thüringen Rudolf Jauch was a friend of the later pacifist and anti-war activist Martin Niemöller.

First Lieutenant Günther Jauch (1919–1942), aid de camp of the Panzer-Artillerieregiment 227 was killed in action during the Lyuban Offensive Operation, a major Russian attack as part of the Siege of Leningrad which was one of the longest and most destructive sieges in history and overwhelmingly the most costly in terms of casualties. His final resting place is since 2000 on the German war cemetery Sologubovka.

=== Daughters of the Jauch and their Descendants ===
==== Catharina Elisabeth Jauch (1671–1736) married von Naumann ====
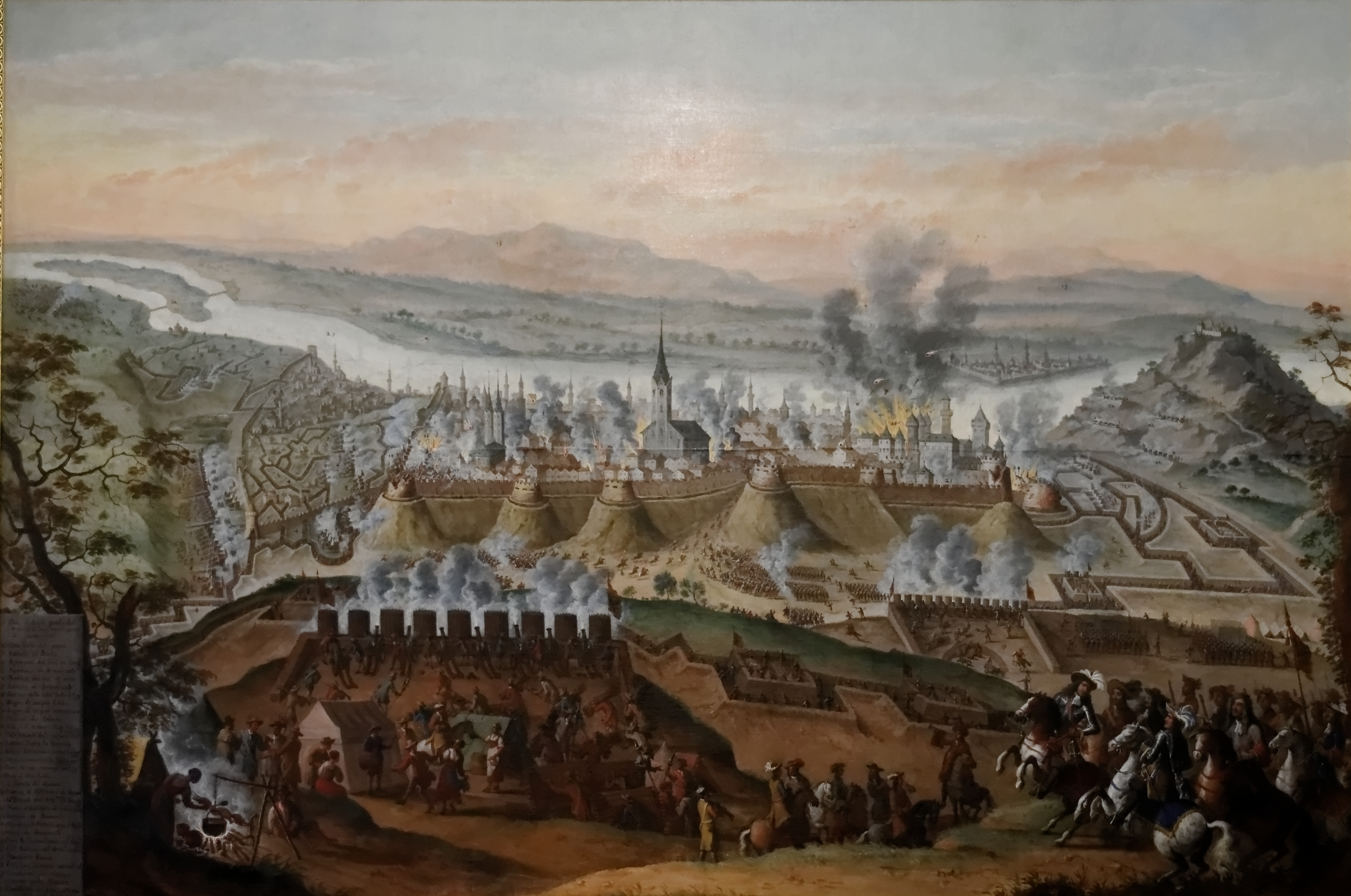
Siege of Buda 1686 by Frans Geffels After all officers of the Corps of Engineers had lost their lives Johann Christoph von Naumann volunteered in the rank of a captain, finished the trenches to the walls, blew a breach in the walls and was in the first squad storming the walls.

Catharina Elisabeth Jauch (1671–1736) married the later colonel and architect of King August the Strong, Johann Christoph von Naumann. He was a member of the diplomatic mission of the Holy League in the course of the Treaty of Karlowitz 1699 with the Ottoman Empire, which ended the Great Turkish War.

==== Juliana Agnesa Jauch (1673 bis nach 1712) married Baroness von Schmiedel ====
Juliana Agnesa Jauch (1673–1712) married Baron (German: Freiherr) Johann Rudolf von Schmiedel, Saxon district governor (German: Amtshauptmann) and councillor of the board of domains (German: Landkammerrat), their son being Baron Franz Rudolf von Schmiedel, Lord Steward of the Household (German: Hofmarschall) of the extravagant Ernest Augustus I, Duke of Saxe-Weimar-Eisenach.

==== Constance Jauch (1722–1802) married von Lölhöffel ====
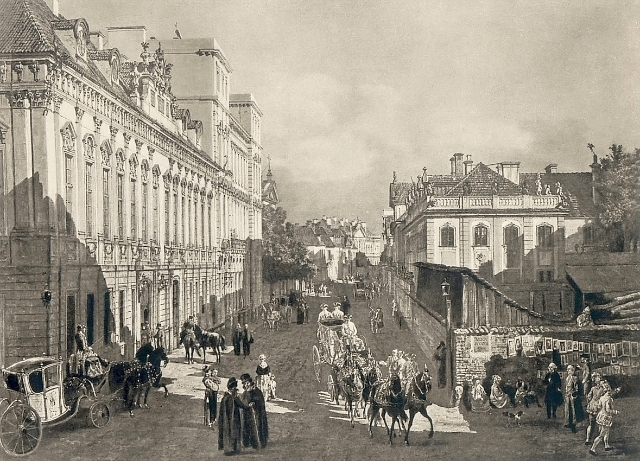
Lelewel Palace built for Constance Jauch (1722–1802) Painting by Canaletto with the palace on the left side of Miodowa Street between the Capuchin church in the middle left and the Krasiński Palace at the rear

Joachim Daniel Jauch's daughter Constance Jauch (1722–1802) married Heinrich Lölhöffel von Löwensprung (1705–1763), privy councillor (German: Hofrat) and physician to the King Augustus III of Poland. After the death of her father she erected 1755 by Ephraim Schröger the Lelewel Palace – her polonized name – in the Miodowa. Regardless the early death of her husband in 1763 she enabled a splendid career for her children.

Her son Karol Maurycy Lelewel (1750–1830) married a daughter of the starosta of Babice, niece of the archbishop and metropolitan of the archdiocese of Mogilev Kasper Cieciszowski (1745–1831). Karol Mauricy Lelewel was a Royal Polish captain, reached the indygenat, the naturalisation as a Polish noble, and became a member of the general sejm. 1789 he became appointed as cup-bearer of the Grand Duchy of Lithuania (Polish: Podczaszy wielki litewski), a title possessed prior by Stanisław August Poniatowski before he was elected as the last king and grand duke of the Polish-Lithuanian Commonwealth.

Karol Mauricy was from 1778 until 1794 the lawyer and treasurer of the Commission of National Education, which was because of its vast authority and autonomy considered the first Ministry of Education in European history. Lelwel was also centrally linked to another important achievement of the Polish Enlightenment, the Constitution of May 3, 1791.

After 1789 during the Sejm Wielki the reformers had to sacrifice many of their privileges in order to gain support for the Constitution of May the 3rd. Nevertheless, it is often argued, with quite some force, that because of the efforts of the Commission of National Education, the Polish language and culture did not disappear into oblivion, during the Partitions of Poland - heavy Russification and Germanisation notwithstanding.

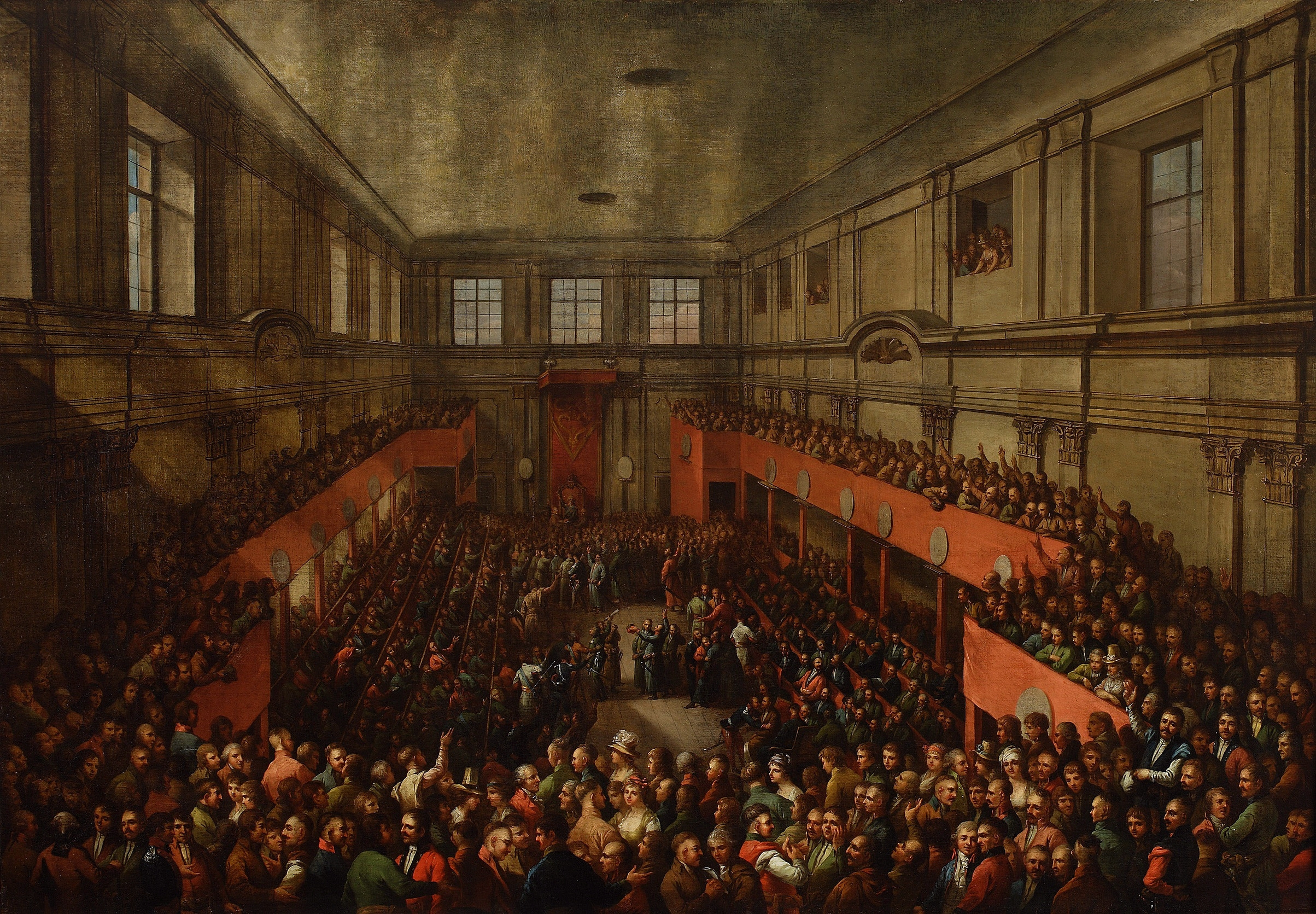
Polish Constitution of May 3, 1791 ballot in the hall of the senators designed 1733 by Joachim Daniel Jauch, his grandson Karol Mauricy Lelewel (1750–1830) being one of the fathers of the constitution

Constance Jauch's grandsons were Joachim, Prot und Jan Pawel Lelewel.

Joachim Lelewel (1786–1861) became Poland's most famous historian. He was a rebel, creator of Poland's unofficial motto "For our freedom and yours", member of Poland's Provisional Government 1830, was jointly with Karl Marx and Friedrich Engels founder and vice-president of the Democratic Society for the Unification and Brotherhood of all People in Brussels (Demokratische Gesellschaft zur Einigung und Verbrüderung aller Völker (Brüssel)). The anarchist Michail Bakunin was strongly influenced by him. He was a friend of Gilbert du Motier, marquis de Lafayette, who had given shelter to him in his manor Lagrange, where he was later arrested and then expelled from France. The 29 May is Lelewel's memorial day in the Jewish almanc for his commitment for the Jewish emancipation.

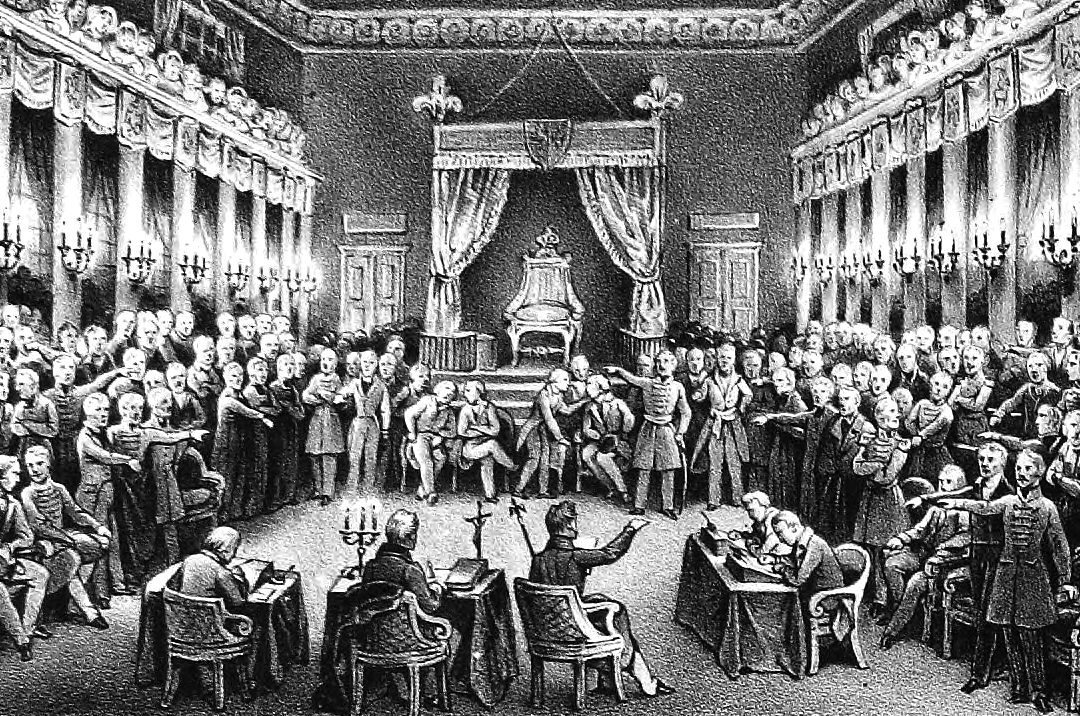
Dethronement of Czar Nicholas I 1831 as King of Poland under the leadership of Joachim Lelewel, restorer and president of the radical Patriotic Club (Polish: Klub Patriotyczny)

Prot Lelewel (1790–1884) served as a captain during the French invasion of Russia, participated 1812 in the Battle of Berezina and 1813 in the Battle of Leipzig and was decorated as a chevalier of the Légion d'honneur and with the silver medal of the Virtuti Militari. Lieutenant Colonel Jan Pawel Lelewel (1796–1847), was a Polish freedom fighter who unsuccessfully defended 1831 Praga against the Russian invasion and participated on 3 April 1833 in the Frankfurter Wachensturm, the attempt to start a revolution in all German states. 1816–1826 he modernized Zamość Fortress, after his escape from Poland and Germany he became 1837–1947 head engineer of the Canton of Bern.

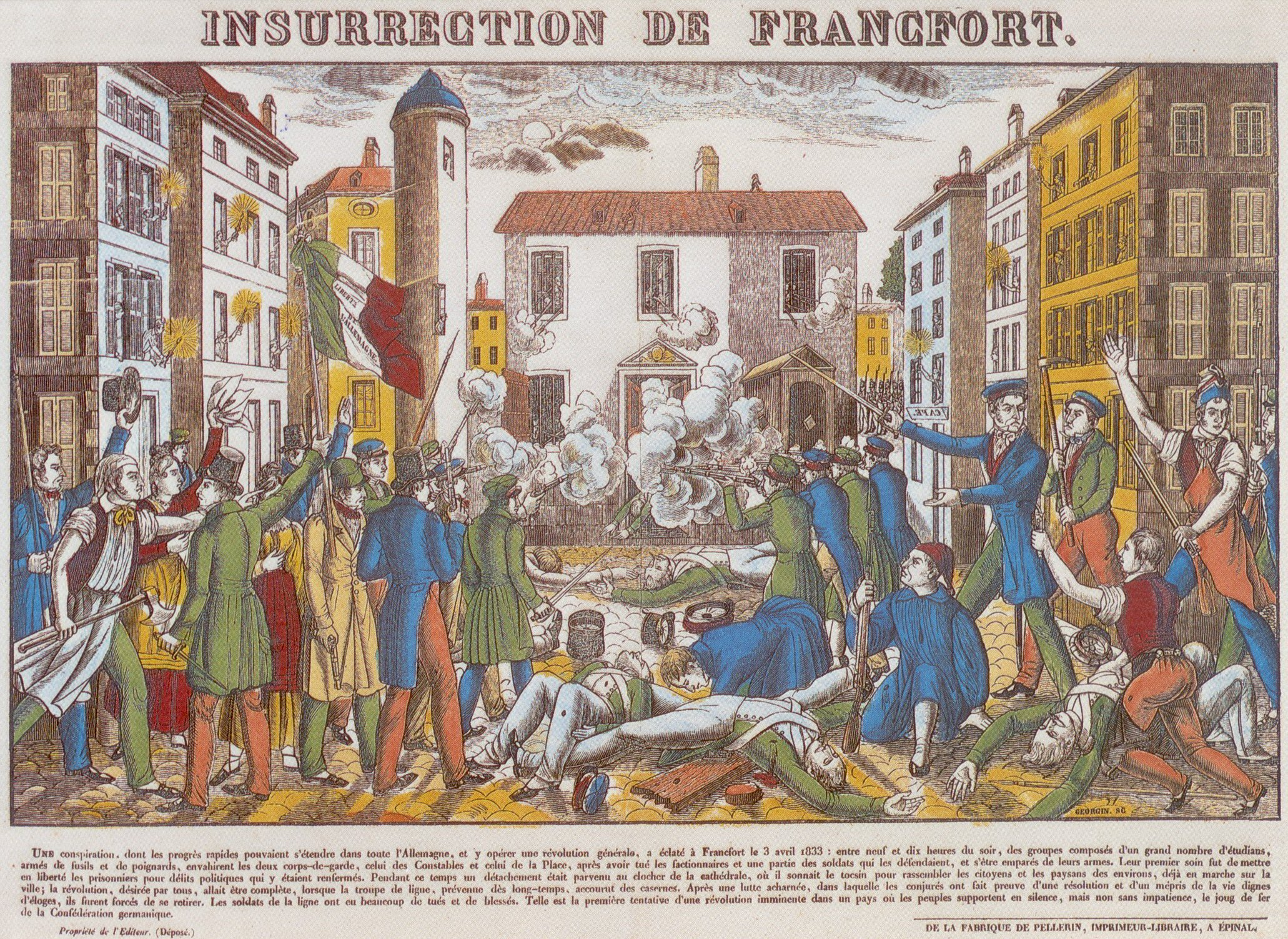
Charge of the Frankfurt Guard House 1833 with the participation of Jan Pawel Lelewel (supported by his brother Joachim) who sought asylum in Switzerland following the failed attempt to start a revolution in Germany,

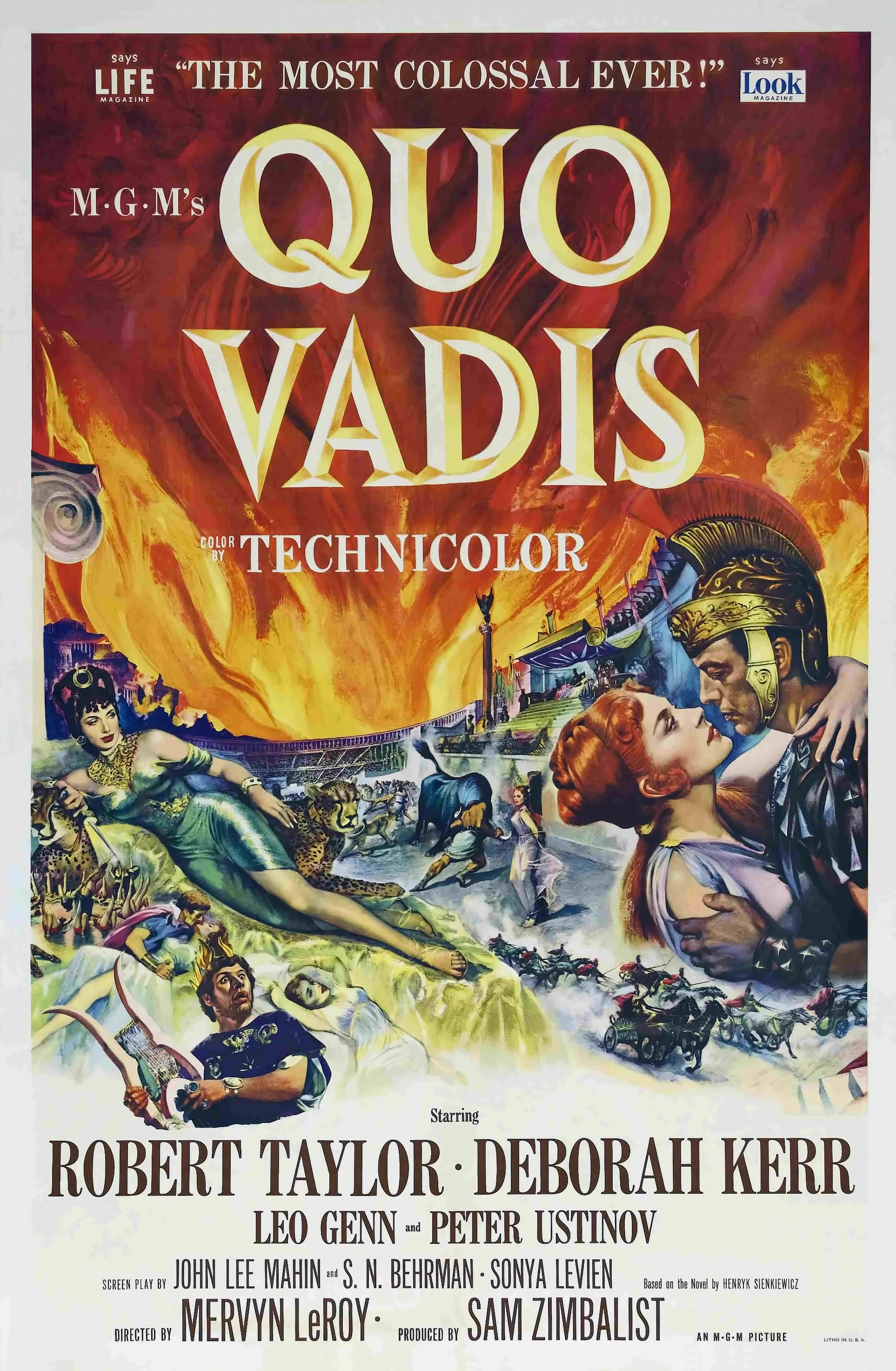
Quo Vadis – epic film after Henryk Sienkiewicz's novel

Constance Jauch's daughter Teresa Lelewelowna (1752–1814) married Adam Józef Cieciszowski (1743–1783), brother of the archbishop and metropolitan Kasper Cieciszowski. He was Great Scribe of Lithuania (Latin: notarius magnus Lithuaniae) and knight of the Order of Saint Stanislaus. Her granddaughter Aleksandra Franciszka Cieciszowska was married to the Polish minister Jan Paweł Łuszczewski 1784–1795 private secretary of the last King and Grand Duke of the Polish-Lithuanian Commonwealth Stanisław August Poniatowski. He was nominated as count by the King Augustus III of Poland. Their granddaughter Jadwiga Łuszczewska (1834–1908), daughter of the economist Wacław Józef Łuszczewski and the writer Magdalena Łuszczewska, was a Polish poet and novelist.

Great-grandson of Constance Jauch was the Nobel Prize-winning novelist, author of "Quo vadis", Henryk Sienkiewicz (1846–1916). His daughter was the painter Jadwiga Sienkiewicz-Korniłowiczowa.

Another great-grandson was the founder of the Polish historical study of literature Ignacy Chrzanowski (1866–1940), who died during the Sonderaktion Krakau at Sachsenhausen concentration camp. His son Lieutenant Bogdan Chrzanowski was murdered by Soviet soldiers, on the expressed orders of Joseph Stalin, in the Katyn massacre. His daughter Hanna Chrzanowska is being investigated by the Catholic Church for possible sainthood. The council of cardinals in Rome has decreed that she has practised the cardinal virtues of Faith, Hope and Charity to a heroic degree and, therefore, may be referred to as Venerable Servant of God.

Constance Jauch's granddaughter Anna Cieciszowska was sister-in-law of Magdalena Agnieszka Sapieżyna (1739–1780), daughter of Antoni Benedykt Lubomirski and informal consort of King Stanisław August Poniatowski. Great-aunt of Constance's progeny Lelewel was Jadwiga Walewska (b. 1740), sister-in-law of Countess Maria Walewska (1786–1817), mistress of Napoleon Bonaparte.

==== Eleonora Maria Jauch (1732–1797) married Overbeck ====
Eleonora Maria Jauch (1732–1797), daughter of The Very Reverend and vice-dean of the cathedral of Bardowick Johann Christian Jauch (1702–1788), married Georg Christian Overbeck (1713–1786), lawyer at Lübeck and son of the dean Caspar Nicolaus Overbeck. Her son was the mayor of Lübeck Christian Adolph Overbeck (1755–1821). Before he was a senator of Lübeck and sent three times as ambassador Lübeck's to Paris, where he attended on 1 April 1810 the marriage of Napoleon I and Marie Louise, Duchess of Parma in the Louvre and later the "banquet imperial" there, distorting in his ironical, Jonathan Swift citing comment a line of Virgil's Aeneid: "quaeque et pulcerrima vidi, et quorum pars parva fui.".

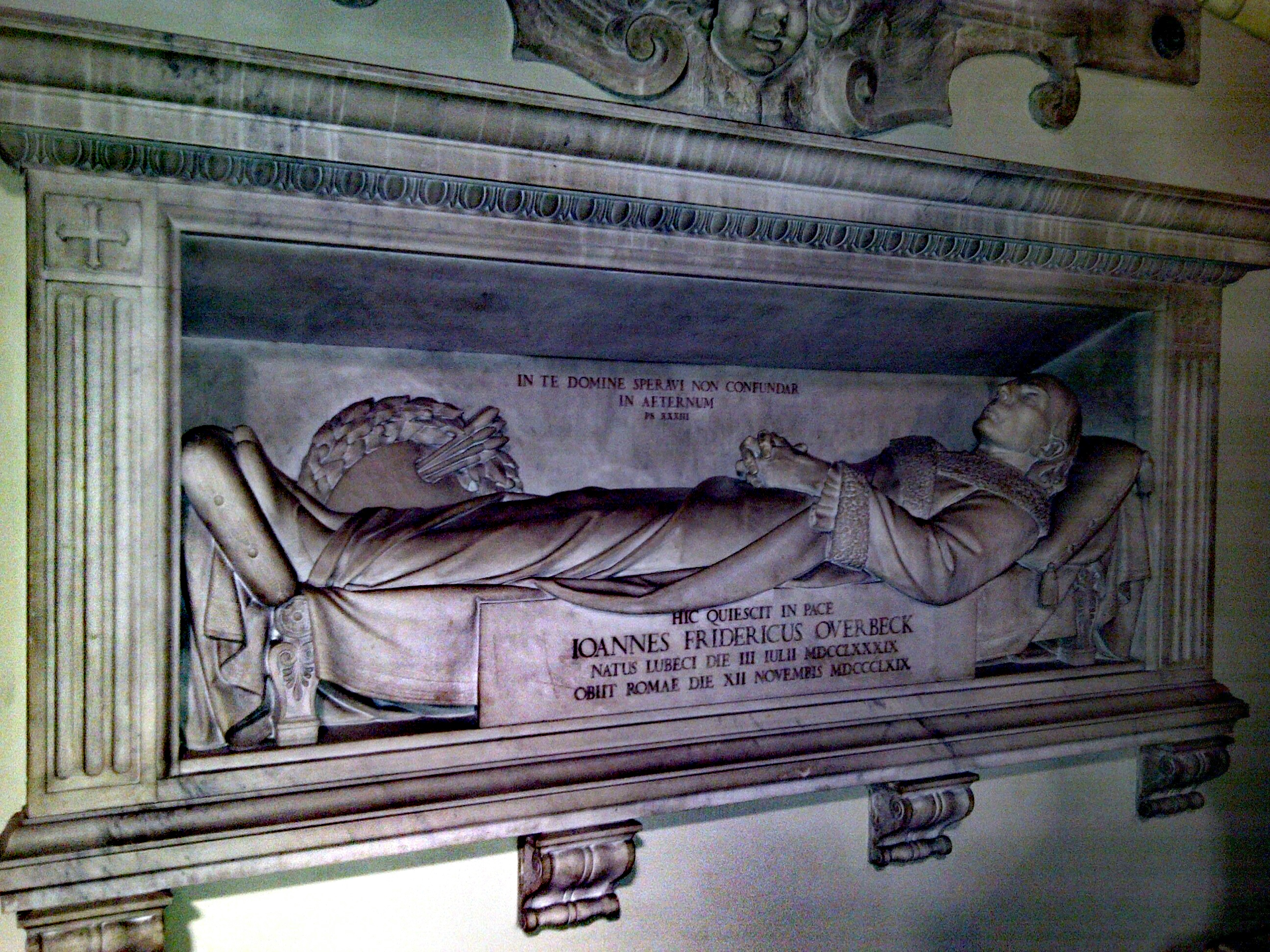
Tomb of Friedrich Overbeck San Bernardo alle Terme, Rome, Italy

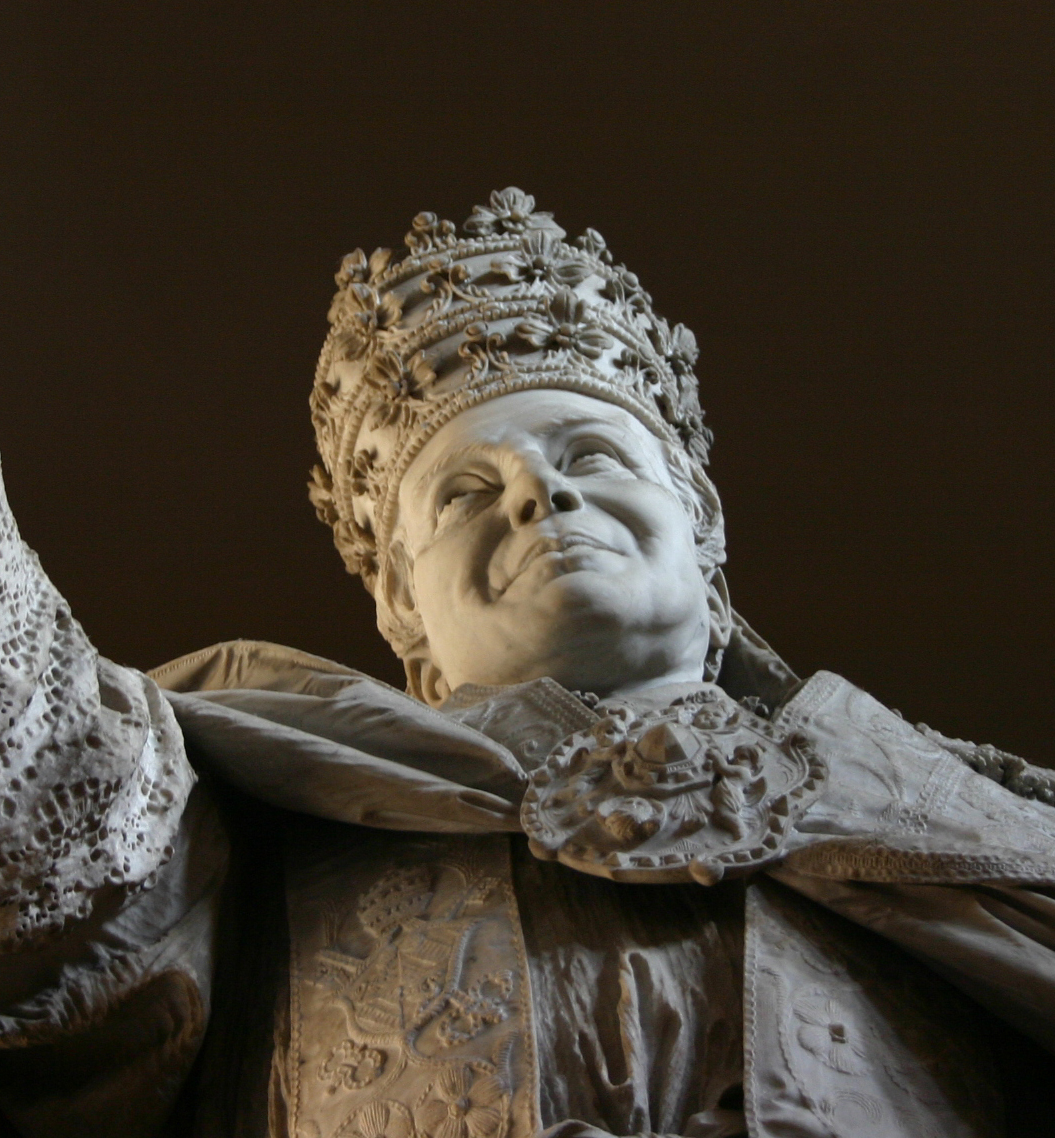
Pope Pius IX

Her grandson was the painter and head of the Nazarene movement Johann Friedrich Overbeck (1789–1869), decorated with the Prussian Order Pour le Mérite for Sciences and Arts. On 7 February 1857 Pope Pius IX came for a personal visit in his home, the Villa Cancellotti next to the Via Merulana in Rome. At that time he was painting the large-sized "Christ absconding from the Jews" (1858), a commission from Pius IX, and an allegory on the pope's escape 1848 from Rome in disguise as a regular priest, originally on a ceiling in the Quirinal Palace, later covered by the king, and now hanging in front of the Aula delle Benedizione in the Vatican. The Pope encouraged him:

Pius PP. IX. – Equiti Federico Overbeckio! To the beloved son salutations and Apostolic Blessing. We appreciate how conscientious you are, how excellent in the art of painting, ... no less we are aware of your outstanding faith and all your abilities, all your talents, which may come together, when you will perfect your oeuvre. Very close to our heart is everything, which forsters faith. We write this since you shall be encouraged, to maintain the enthusiasm for your oeuvre ... In the meantime we humbly implore the Lord, the origin of all good, that he in his divine grace will always be gracious to you. We assure you our fatherly love and like to grant you, beloved son, our Apostolic Blessing. Datum Romae apud S. Petrum die 2 Septembris 1850 Pontificatus Nostri anno quinto

— Pope Pius IX, writ (Latin: Breve) to Friedrich Overbeck 1850

The archaeologist Johannes Adolph Overbeck (1826–1895) was Constance Jauch's grand-grandson. Her great-granddaughter Cäcilie Lotte Eleonore Overbeck (1856-post 1920), married the anthropologist and ethnologist Emil Ludwig Schmidt (1837–1906), who was personal physician of the hypochondriac "Cannon King" Alfred Krupp. The great-granddaughter Wilhelmine Friederike Charlotte Overbeck (1829–1908) was wedded to the well known mechanical engineer Franz Reuleaux (1829–1905), chairman of the German panel of judges for the Centennial International Exhibition in Philadelphia 1876. Great-great-granddaughter Agnes Elisabeth Overbeck (1870–1919), a pianist, was married under the pseudonym "Baron Eugen Borisowitsch Onégin" to the operatic contralto Sigrid Onégin, who sang inter alia at Metropolitan Opera and Covent Garden.

Karl von Treuenfeld led the manhunt after the Operation Anthropoid

===== Buddenbrook-Nobility =====
The denotation ″Buddenbrook-Nobility″ traces back to Thomas Mann's novel Buddenbrooks which won Mann the Nobel Prize in Literature in 1929. Mann portrayed the manner of life and mores of the Hanseatics in the 19th century. The city where the Buddenbrook family lives shares so many of its street names and other details with Mann's hometown of Lübeck that the identification is perfect, although Mann carefully avoids explicit pronunciation of the name throughout the novel. In spite of this fact, many German readers, in particular such from Lübeck, and critics attacked Mann for writing about the "dirty laundry" of his hometown and his own family. However, for a long time that what had been attacked in the past was later regarded being an ennoblement. Those who have a close or distant relative, who has been portrayed in the Buddenbrooks, are half-ironically but at the same time respectfully counted among the "Buddenbrook-nobility".

Descendant Charlotte Leithoff (1819–1903) married consul Johann Heinrich Harms (1810–1893) (in the novel: August Möllendorpf), brother of the senator Georg Friedrich Harms (1811–1892) (in the novel: Senator Möllendorpf), who was married to the descendant Emma Wilhelmine Buck (1832–1896) (in the novel: Frau Möllendorpf geb. Langhals) and father of Lorenz Harms (1840–1915) (in the novel: Konsul Kistenmaker). Eleonora Maria Jauch's great-granddaughter Henriette Charlotte Harms (1842–1928) married the senator of Lübeck Johann Fehling (1835–1893), brother of the mayor of Lübeck Emil Ferdinand Fehling (in the novel: Dr. Moritz Hagenström) und brother-in-law of the mayor of Lübeck Heinrich Theodor Behn (in the novel: Bürgermeister Kaspar Oeverdieck). He was a grandson of the poet Emanuel Geibel (in the novel: Jean Jacques Hoffstede). Their daughter Emilie Charlotte Adele Fehling (1865–1890) married the novelist Lieutenant Bernhard von Hindenburg, brother of the Field Marshal und President of Germany Paul von Hindenburg.

==== Ludovica Jauch (1772–1805) ====
===== married Deetz =====
The granddaughter of The Very Reverend and vice-dean of the cathedral of Bardowick Johann Christian Jauch (1702–1788), Margaretha Eleonora Ludovica Jauch (1772–1805) was married twice. Son from her first marriage with the merchant Johann Carl Deetz was Colonel Albert Deetz (1772–1852) who became in 1847 town major of Wittenberg. Later he became head of the central office of the Prussian Minister of War. 1848–1854 he was town major of Frankfurt, member of the Frankfurt Parliament and one of the thirtytwo members of the Emperor Deputation, chosen by the National Assembly, which offered on 3 April 1849 the Imperial Crown of Germany to Frederick William IV of Prussia.

In Frankfurt I lodged in the L'hotel de Russie ... I became acquainted with an endearing 'ruin of the parliament', the town commandant of Frankfurt, the Prussian colonel von Deetz. This good old man told me stories from a Thousand and One Nights and forgot totally, that he was a Prussian colonel.

— Georg Weerth, letter to Friedrich Engels 1852

Otto von Bismarck was at that time the Prussian envoy to the Federal Convention in Frankfurt. His relationship to Albert Deetz as town commandant of Frankfurt and member of the Convention was distressed, because Deetz strictly refused to cooperate with him. Bismarck reported to Berlin:

The conspirator Deetz always causes inconvenience for me.

— Otto von Bismarck

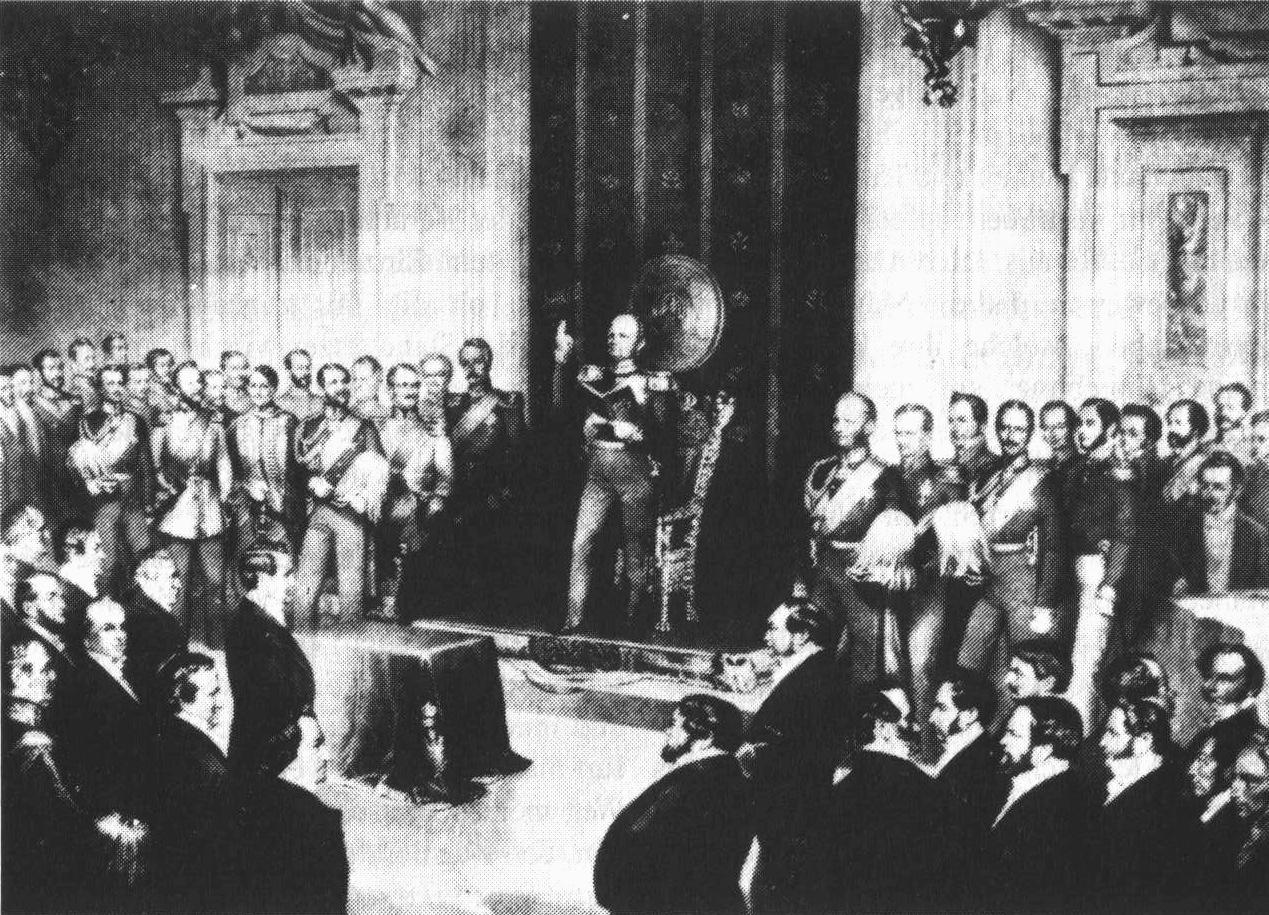
Emperor Deputation on 3 April 1849 offering Frederick William IV of Prussia the office of emperor, among the deputies the then major Albert Deetz (in the corner left side down)

Ludovica Jauch's great-great-grandson was Lieutenant Commander (German: Korvettenkapitän) Friedrich Deetz, commander of the German submarine U-757, which was sunk 1944 in the North Atlantic, south-west of Iceland, by depth charges from the British frigate HMS Bayntun and the Canadian corvette HMCS Camrose. Another great-great-grandson, Colonel Günther Nentwig (1899–1943), bearer of the Knight's Cross of the Iron Cross, was killed in action as commander of the 295. Infanterie-Division in the Battle of Stalingrad.

===== Married Griebel =====
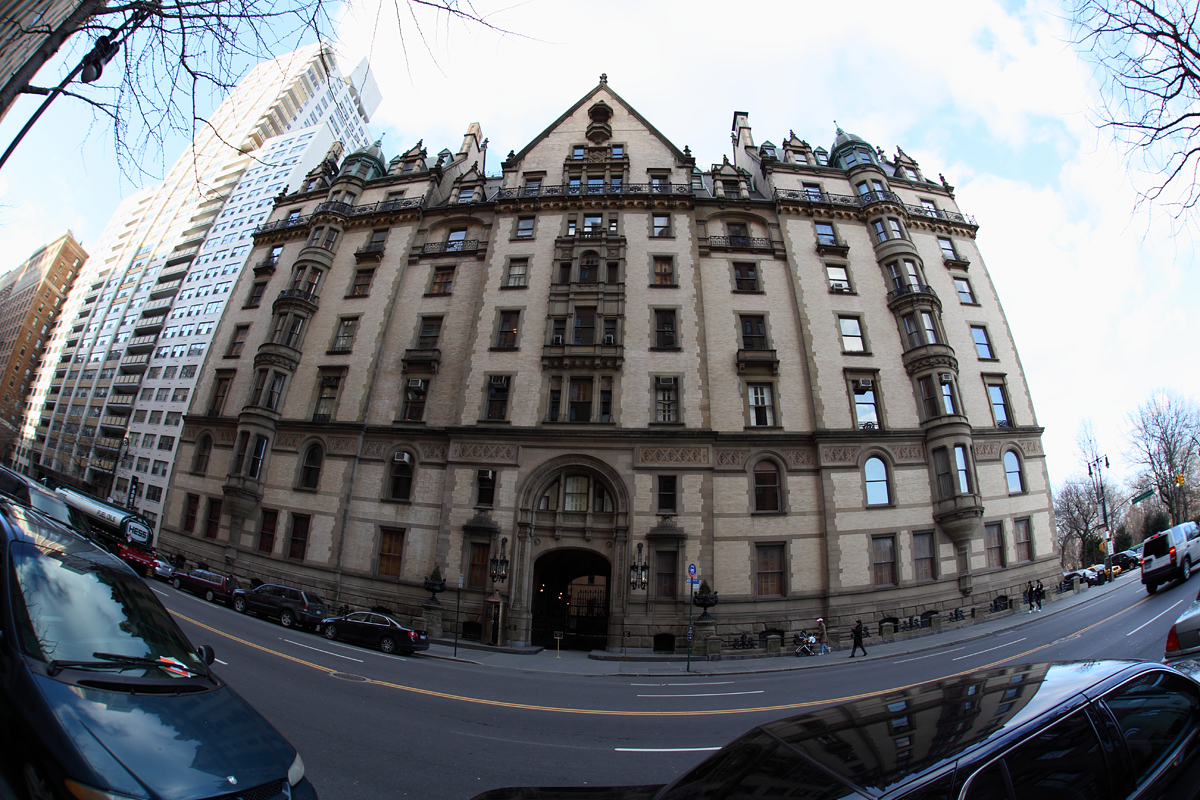
The Dakota, built by George Henry Griebel

After the death of her first husband Ludovica Jauch married the bassoonist of the Royal Prussian Court Orchestra Johann Heinrich Griebel (1772–1852), stemming from a musical family whose members belonged to the royal orchestra of King Frederick II of Prussia. He was the first teacher of the composer Albert Lortzing, the main representative of the German Spieloper.

Her stepson Frederick Griebel (1819–1859), who lived in Toronto, was the first professional violinist in Canada. Twenty years after his death, he was still described as "the greatest violinist ever resident in this city".

Her stepgrandchild was the New York City architect George Henry Griebel (1846–1933), who built 1871 in San Antonio, Texas the quadrangle at Fort Sam Houston, later the Dakota Building in New York and the grand staircase in the Great Hall of the Library of Congress.

==== Wilhelmine Jauch (1809–1893) married Avé-Lallemant ====
Wilhelmine Jauch (1809–1893) married Theodor Avé-Lallemant, from his maternal side a descendant of the Huguenot leader in the French Wars of Religion Gaspard II de Coligny (1519–1572). Avé-Lallemant was a musician, music-teacher and music-critic. His wife's wealth enabled him, to become after getting married an important promoter of the music and to play for almost half a century a leading role in Hamburg's music life. He was until his death the chief director of the Hamburg Philharmonic Society (German: Philharmonische Gesellschaft). In 1841 he organized and directed the 3rd North German Music Festival in 1841 in Hamburg, which was the biggest festival of its time.

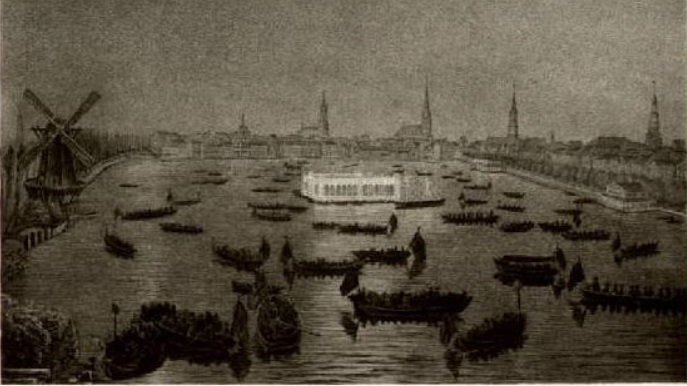
Elves' pavilion in the glow of candlelight rising in stilts amid Hamburg's Inner Alster Lake. Nocturnal concert of the North German Music Festival 1841, organized and directed by Theodor Avé-Lallemant

Hans von Bülow dedicated to Avé-Lallemant his Chant polonais Opus 12. Klaus Mann describes in his novel Pathetic Symphony (French: Symphonie Pathétique) about the life of Peter Tchaikovsky a meeting between Tchaikovsky and Avé-Lallemant. Tchaikovsky dedicated to his admirer Avé-Lallemant, for whom he had a lot of sympathy, his 5th Symphony.

First of all I should mention the chief director of the Philharmonic Society, the aged Herr Avé-Lallemant. This most venerable old man of over eighty paid me great attention and treated me with paternal affection. ... When I then visited this kindly old gentleman, who passionately loves music and who, as should be obvious to the reader, is quite free from that aversion which many old people have against everything that has been written in recent times, I had a very lengthy and interesting conversation with him. ... We parted as great friends.

— Peter Tchaikovsky, Autobiographical Account of a Tour Abroad in the Year 1888 (Chapter XI)

Johannes Brahms, who was a fourth cousin twice removed of Robert Jauch (1856–1909) and Bertha Jauch (1860–1935), and Robert Schumann became godfathers of two of Theodor Avé-Lallemant's and Wilhelmine Jauch's sons.

At the table at Lallemant, who has a very pleasant and educated wife.

— Robert Schumann, Diaries, vol. II, 1987, p. 210

The collection of letters from a number of composers and scores by Brahms is since 2000 part of the collection of the Brahms-Institut. Avé-Lallemant, who played the violin himself, possessed the Cremonese violin of Prince Louis Ferdinand of Prussia (1772–1806). Apart from being a soldier in the Napoleonic Wars, Louis Ferdinand was also a gifted musician and composer. The prince brought his violin also to military campaigns. He bequeathed it to his friend, Avé-Lallemant's father, the evening before his death in the Battle of Saalfeld with the words: ″In case that I will not return from the battle.″

==== Charlotte Jauch (1811–1872) married Lührsen ====
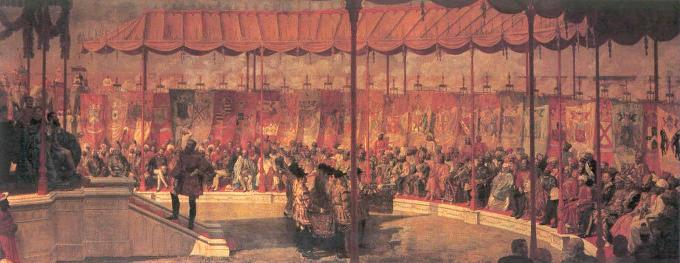
Robert Bulwer-Lytton, Viceroy of India (sitting in Delhi 1877 upon the throne on the left) Uncle-in-law of Carmen Lührsen

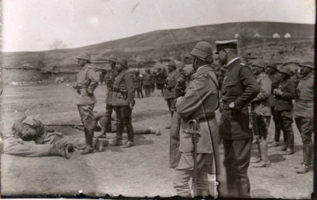
Battle of Sarikamish 1914: Enver Pasha (half right) Otto von Feldmann (right)

==== Bertha Jauch (1860–1935) married Knoop ====
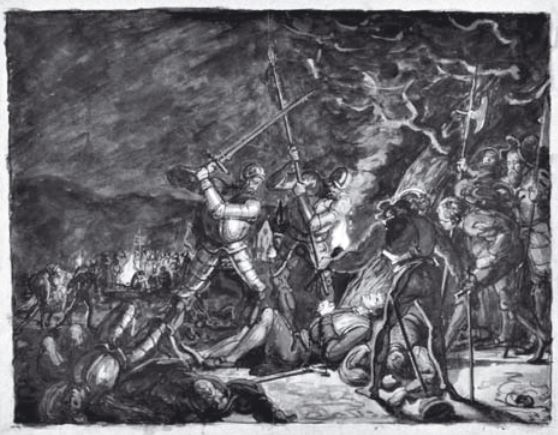
Reformator Huldrych Zwingli is killed 1531 in the Battle of Kappel, won by commander Hans Jauch

== Other known Families with the Name "Jauch" ==
=== Citizens of the Canton of Uri in the Old Swiss Confederacy ===
The Jauch from the Canton of Uri in the Old Swiss Confederacy, are chronicled since 1368. They stepped up significantly for the first time with Hans Jauch (1500–1568), who won 1531 during the Reformation in Switzerland for the Roman Catholic cantons the Second War of Kappel. The Altdorf main branch of these Jauch became known as Swiss mercenaries. This family is not related to the Hanseatic Jauch covered here.

=== Commoners of the Grand Duchy of Baden ===
Neither are related to the Hanseatic Jauch the Jauch of Villingen-Schwenningen and the surrounding municipalities in today's Schwarzwald-Baar district, who were commoners of the Grand Duchy of Baden.

Most Jauch spread over the world in present-day time descend from these Jauch, of whom a number due to poverty and famine emigrated with hundreds of other inhabitants in several waves from 1747–1754, 1801, 1817, 1847 and in the period thereafter until about 1890 to Prussia, Bessarabia, the United States and Canada. For example, Schwenningen sent in April 1847 about 200 further residents – including a few Jauch –, corresponding to 5 percent of its population of the time, across the Atlantic. The municipality had calculated that it would cost less to send the poorest to America than it would to support them until the famine ended, which resulted from the bad potato harvest in 1846.

To the Jauch of Schwennigen belongs – though stationed in Hamburg – the SS Oberscharführer Ewald Jauch, who was convicted and given the death sentence in 1946 because of his involvement in the killings in the subcamp Bullenhuser Damm of the Neuengamme concentration camp.

=== Commoners of the Electorate of Saxony ===
Another Jauch family considered in the literature originates from Pegau and spread to Meißen in the Electorate of Saxony. Their ancestor was the butcher Andreas Jauch (b. 1523) and their best known member was the jurist and controlling clerk of the 17th century Haubold Gottfried Jauch. There is no relationship to the Hanseatic Jauch family, too.

== Family tree (under construction) ==
Georg Jauch^{Major of Sulza 1606–1675}
Christian Jauch der Ältere^{First Lackey und Butler of the Hereditary Prince Charles of Mecklenburg-Güstrow; 1688 Purveryor to the Court of Güstrow; 1696 Dealer at Lüneburg 1638–1718}
Johann Christopher Jauch^{Dean at Lüneburg 1669–1725}	Catharina Elisabeth Jauch^{1671–1736}∞ Johann Christoph von Naumann	Christian Jauch the Younger^{1699 registered in the Guild's Register of the Dealers at Hamburg; 1701 Dealer at Lüneburg † 1720}	Carl Jauch^{Kaufmann und Postagent Lübecks zu Lüneburg 1680–1755}	Franz Georg Jauch^{Lieutenant Colonel der Königlich-Polnischen Krongarde; 1724 bei dem Thorner Blutgericht 1682–1753}	Joachim Daniel; Jauch^{Generalmajor und Barockarchitekt zu Warschau 1688–1754}
Ludolph Friedrich Jauch^{Hauptpastor an St. Michaelis zu Lüneburg 1698–1764}	Tobias Christoph Jauch^{Stadt-Secretarius zu Lüneburg 1703–1776}	Johann Christian Jauch^{Erster Domherr und Vize-Dekan zu Bardowick 1702–1778}	Carl Daniel Jauch^{1740 Erbauer des Stammhauses in Lüneburg; 1752 Begründer der Jauchschen Handlung in Hamburg 1714–1795}	Adolph Jauch^{Kaiserlicher Notar zu Hannover 1705–1758}	Constance Jauch^{1722–1802} ∞ Heinrich von Lölhöffel
Johann Georg Jauch^{Offizier a. D. und Kaufmann zu Lauenburg 1727–1799}	Eleonora Maria Jauch^{1732–1797 ∞ Georg Christian Overbeck; Advokat zu Lübeck}	Friedrich August Jauch^{Senator zu Hannover-Calenberg 1741–1796}	Heinrich Georg Jauch^{Oberstleutnant der Königlich-Polnischen Krongarde * 1709}	Carl Jauch^{Gerichtsverwalter zu Horneburg; Domherr zu Bardowick 1735–1818}
Johann Christian Jauch senior^{Großbürger zu Hamburg in Firma J. C. Jauch & Söhne; Ältester Deichgeschworener 1765–1855}	Ludovica Jauch^{1772–1805 ∞: 1. Johann Carl Deetz; 2. Joh. Heinr. Griebel}	Christian Adolph Overbeck^{Bürgermeister von Lübeck 1755–1821}
Johann Christian Jauch junior^{Großbürger zu Hamburg; Herr auf Wellingsbüttel 1802–1880}	Moritz Jauch^{Großbürger zu Hamburg; Olt. d. Hanseat. Kavallerie 1804–1876} ∞ Auguste Jauch	Wilhelmine Jauch^{1809–1893} ∞ Theodor Avé-Lallemant	Charlotte Jauch^{1811–1872} ∞ Gustav Lührsen	Luise Jauch^{1815–1881 ∞ Adolf Halske; Großbürger zu Hamburg}	Hermann Jauch^{Herr auf Fernsicht 1817–1859}
Carl Jauch^{Großbürger zu Hamburg; Herr auf Wellingsbüttel; Olt. d. Hanseat. Kavallerie 1828–1888}	Hermann Jauch^{Herr auf Schönhagen und Schwonendal 1858–1916}	August Jauch^{Herr auf Fernsicht; Repräsentant der Notabeln in der Hamburgischen Bürgerschaft; Rittmeister a. D. 1848–1930}
Robert Jauch^{Herr auf Krummbek 1859–1909}	Paul Jauch^{Kaufmann in Firma Jauch Gebr. Import & Export 1857–1915}	Bertha Jauch^{1860–1935 ∞ William Oscar Knoop}	Heinrich Jauch^{Erster Staatsanwalt zu Hamburg 1894–1945}
Hans Jauch^{Oberst und Freikorpsführer; Fabrikant 1883–1965}	Luise Jauch^{Oberschwester auf dem „Zauberberg“ (Adriatica von Mylendonk) 1885–1933}	Walter Jauch^{Gründer von Jauch & Hübener; Rittmeister d. Res. 1888–1976}
Robert Jauch^{Kaufmann; Oberleutnant d. Res. Teilnehmer der Schlacht um Stalingrad 1913–2000}	Hermann Jauch^{Hauptmann stv. Regimentsadjutant im Stab des Art.-Regts. 69 1914–1943}	Günther Jauch^{Oberleutnant; Abteilungs-Adjutant im Stab des Art.-Rgts 227 1919–1942}	Ernst-Alfred Jauch^{Journalist; Leiter des Landesbüros Berlin der KNA; Leutnant d. Res. 1920–1991}
Hans-Gerd Hermann Jauch^{Insolvenzverwalter * 1953}	Robert Jauch^{Priester; Franziskaner (OFM) * 1954}	Günther Jauch^{Fernsehmoderator, Journalist und Produzent; Besitzer des Weinguts von Othegraven * 1956}

== Bibliography ==
=== Family-related literature ===
- Bertram, Johann Georg [in German] (1719). "Aus dem Leben des jetzigen Superint. M. Joh. Christ. Jauchen" [From the Life of the Present Dean M. Joh. Christ. Jauchen]. Das evangelische Lüneburg: oder Reformations- und Kirchen-Historie der Alt-berühmten Stadt Lüneburg [The Evangelical Lüneburg: Or History of the Reformation and the Church of the Famous City of Lüneburg] (in German). Braunschweig: Ludolph Schröder Buchhandlung.
- Biernacki, Andrzej (1973). Polska Akademia Nauk (Polish Academy of Sciences); Polska Akademia Umiejętności (Polish Academy of Learning); Instytut Historii im. Tadeusza Manteuffla (Tadeusz Manteuffel Historical Institute) (eds.). Łuszczewska Jadwiga. Polski słownik biograficzny (Polish Biographical Dictionary) (in Polish). Vol. XVIII. Kraków. pp. 581–583.
- Bokszczanin, Maria (1996–1997). Polska Akademia Nauk (Polish Academy of Sciences); Polska Akademia Umiejętności (Polish Academy of Learning); Instytut Historii im. Tadeusza Manteuffla (Tadeusz Manteuffel Historical Institute) (eds.). Sienkiewicz-Korniłowiczowa Jadwiga. Polski słownik biograficzny (Polish Biographical Dictionary) (in Polish). Vol. XXXVII. Kraków. pp. 227–228.
- Boniecki, Adam (1905). Herbarz Polski [Polish Family Register] (in Polish). Vol. 8. Warsaw.
- Brykczyńska, Gosia. Colours of Fire. The Life of Hanna Chrzanowska. William R. Parks. LCCN 2014905477.
- Danielewiczowa, Maria (1938a). Polska Akademia Nauk (Polish Academy of Sciences); Polska Akademia Umiejętności (Polish Academy of Learning); Instytut Historii im. Tadeusza Manteuffla (Tadeusz Manteuffel Historical Institute) (eds.). Cieciszowski Adam Józef. Polski słownik biograficzny (Polish Biographical Dictionary) (in Polish). Vol. IV. Kraków. pp. 37–38.
- Dräger, Hartwig (1993). Buddenbrooks. Dichtung und Wirklichkeit, Bilddokumente [Buddenbrooks. Fiction and Facts, Pictorial Documents] (in German). Lübeck.
- Feldmann, Otto von (2013). Feldmann, Peter von (ed.). Türkei, Weimar, Hitler. Lebenserinnerungen eines preußischen Offiziers und deutschnationalen Politikers [Turkey, Weimar, Hitler. Memoirs of a Prussian Officer and German Nationalist Politician] (in German). winterwork. ISBN 978-3864683923.
- Fiege, Hartwig (1984). Über die Wellingsbütteler Gutsbesitzerfamilie Jauch [About the Jauch Family of Wellingsbüttel Manor]. In: Jahrbuch des Alstervereins (in German). Hamburg: Alsterverein.
- Godlewski, Michał (1938a). Polska Akademia Nauk (Polish Academy of Sciences); Polska Akademia Umiejętności (Polish Academy of Learning); Instytut Historii im. Tadeusza Manteuffla (Tadeusz Manteuffel Historical Institute) (eds.). Cieciszowski Kacper Kazimierz. Polski słownik biograficzny (Polish Biographical Dictionary) (in Polish). Vol. IV. Kraków. pp. 38–39.
- Hentschel, Walter (1974). "Jauch, Joachim Daniel". In Historische Kommission bei der Bayerischen Akademie der Wissenschaften (ed.). Neue Deutsche Biographie (in German). Vol. 10. Limburg an der Lahn: Duncker & Humblot. p. 368. ISBN 3-428-00191-5.
- Herbst, Stanisław (1964–1965). Polska Akademia Nauk (Polish Academy of Sciences); Polska Akademia Umiejętności (Polish Academy of Learning); Instytut Historii im. Tadeusza Manteuffla (Tadeusz Manteuffel Historical Institute) (eds.). Jauch Daniel Jan [Jauch, Joachim Daniel]. Polski słownik biograficzny (Polish Biographical Dictionary) (in Polish). Vol. XI. Kraków. p. 97.
- Jabłonowski, Władysław (1937). Polska Akademia Nauk (Polish Academy of Sciences); Polska Akademia Umiejętności (Polish Academy of Learning); Instytut Historii im. Tadeusza Manteuffla (Tadeusz Manteuffel Historical Institute) (eds.). Chrzanowski Zygmunt. Polski słownik biograficzny (Polish Biographical Dictionary) (in Polish). Vol. III. Kraków. pp. 467–468.
- Jauch, Hans-Gerd H. (1996). Hahn-Godeffroy, Johann Diederich (ed.). Stammfolge Jauch [The Lineage of the Jauch]. In: Deutsches Geschlechterbuch (in German). Vol. 200 (13. Hamburger). Limburg an der Lahn: C.A.Starke. pp. 337–416. ISBN 3-7980-0200-2.
- Jauch, Hans-Gerd H. (1999). Ihonor, Daniel (ed.). Stammfolge Jauch [The Lineage of the Jauch]. In: Deutsches Geschlechterbuch (in German). Vol. 209 (15. Hamburger). Limburg an der Lahn: C.A.Starke. pp. 31–52. ISBN 3-7980-0209-6.
- Judersleben, Georg (1936). Einwohner Sulzas vor der Reformation [Inhabitants of Sulza before the Protestant Reformation] (in German). Bad Sulza.
- Kallmann, Helmut (1985). "Griebel, Ferdinand (Frederick)". In Halpenny, Francess G. (ed.). Dictionary of Canadian Biography. Vol. VIII (1851–1860) (online ed.). University of Toronto Press.
- Kieniewicz, Stefan (1972a). Polska Akademia Nauk (Polish Academy of Sciences); Polska Akademia Umiejętności (Polish Academy of Learning); Instytut Historii im. Tadeusza Manteuffla (Tadeusz Manteuffel Historical Institute) (eds.). Lelewel Joachim Józef Benedykt. Polski słownik biograficzny (Polish Biographical Dictionary) (in Polish). Vol. XII. Kraków. pp. 21–25.
- Kieniewicz, Stefan (1972b). Polska Akademia Nauk (Polish Academy of Sciences); Polska Akademia Umiejętności (Polish Academy of Learning); Instytut Historii im. Tadeusza Manteuffla (Tadeusz Manteuffel Historical Institute) (eds.). Lelewel Prot Adam Jacek. Polski słownik biograficzny (Polish Biographical Dictionary) (in Polish). Vol. XII. Kraków. pp. 26–27.
- Luchmann, Fritz. Beienanderseyn ist das tägliche Brot der Liebe. Briefe C. A. Overbecks an seine Familie aus St. Petersburg 1804 und aus Paris 1807–1811 [Being closely together is the daily bread of love. Letters from A. Overbeck to his family from St. Petersburg 1804 and from Paris 1807–1811] (in German).
- Lelewel, Prot (1966). Lelewel-Friemannowa, Irena (ed.). Pamietniki i Diariusz Domu Naszego [Historical Reminiscence and Diary of my Parental Home] (in Polish). Wrocław/Warsaw/Kraków.
- Löllhöffel, Erich von (1 Oct 1967). Die deutschen Vorfahren des polnischen Historikers Joachim Lelewel [The German Ancestry of the Polish Historian Joachim Lelewel]. In: Ostdeutsche Familienkunde (in German). Vol. 23. Limburg an der Lahn: C.A.Starke. pp. 371–375.
- Lührsen, Conrad Nikolaus (1989). Die Familie Avé-Lallemant und ihre Töchternachkommen [The Avé-Lallemant Family and their Matrilineal Descent]. Deutsches Familienarchiv (in German). Vol. 23. Limburg an der Lahn: C.A.Starke. pp. 205–243.
- Lührsen, Conrad Nikolaus (1949a). Stammtafel des Geschlechtes Jauch [Family Tree of the Jauch] (in German). Aachen.
- Lührsen, Conrad Nikolaus (1949b). Lührsen aus dem Stamme Lührs (in verschiedenen Schreibweisen) aus Cappel im Lande Wursten [Lührsen originating from Lührs (in different spellings) from Cappel in the Land Wursten] (in German). Aachen.
- Mai, Ekkehard (1998). "Overbeck, Johann Friedrich". In Historische Kommission bei der Bayerischen Akademie der Wissenschaften (ed.). Neue Deutsche Biographie (in German). Vol. 19. Berlin: Duncker & Humblot. pp. 721–723. ISBN 3-428-00200-8.
- Manteufflowa, Maria (1972). Polska Akademia Nauk (Polish Academy of Sciences); Polska Akademia Umiejętności (Polish Academy of Learning); Instytut Historii im. Tadeusza Manteuffla (Tadeusz Manteuffel Historical Institute) (eds.). Lelewel Karol Maurycy. Polski słownik biograficzny (Polish Biographical Dictionary) (in Polish). Vol. XII. Kraków. pp. 25–26.
- Manteufflowa, Maria (1973). Polska Akademia Nauk (Polish Academy of Sciences); Polska Akademia Umiejętności (Polish Academy of Learning); Instytut Historii im. Tadeusza Manteuffla (Tadeusz Manteuffel Historical Institute) (eds.). Łuszczewski Jan Paweł. Polski słownik biograficzny (Polish Biographical Dictionary) (in Polish). Vol. XVIII. Kraków. pp. 584–586.
- Markiewicz, Henryk (1996–1997). Polska Akademia Nauk (Polish Academy of Sciences); Polska Akademia Umiejętności (Polish Academy of Learning); Instytut Historii im. Tadeusza Manteuffla (Tadeusz Manteuffel Historical Institute) (eds.). Sienkiewicz Henryk Adam. Polski słownik biograficzny (Polish Biographical Dictionary) (in Polish). Vol. XXXVII. Kraków. pp. 203–216.
- May, Walter (1997). "Naumann, Johann Christoph von". In Historische Kommission bei der Bayerischen Akademie der Wissenschaften (ed.). Neue Deutsche Biographie (in German). Vol. 18. Berlin: Duncker & Humblot. pp. 770–771. ISBN 3-428-00199-0.
- Meier, Uwe (1998). "Overbeck, Christian Adolph". In Historische Kommission bei der Bayerischen Akademie der Wissenschaften (ed.). Neue Deutsche Biographie (in German). Vol. 19. Berlin: Duncker & Humblot. pp. 720–721. ISBN 3-428-00200-8.
- Michałowska, Helena (1973a). Polska Akademia Nauk (Polish Academy of Sciences); Polska Akademia Umiejętności (Polish Academy of Learning); Instytut Historii im. Tadeusza Manteuffla (Tadeusz Manteuffel Historical Institute) (eds.). Łuszczewska Magdalena. Polski słownik biograficzny (Polish Biographical Dictionary) (in Polish). Vol. XVIII. Kraków. pp. 583–584.
- Michałowska, Helena (1973b). Polska Akademia Nauk (Polish Academy of Sciences); Polska Akademia Umiejętności (Polish Academy of Learning); Instytut Historii im. Tadeusza Manteuffla (Tadeusz Manteuffel Historical Institute) (eds.). Łuszczewski Wacław Józef. Polski słownik biograficzny (Polish Biographical Dictionary) (in Polish). Vol. XVIII. Kraków. pp. 586–587.
- Nahlik, Stanisław E. (1989–1991). Polska Akademia Nauk (Polish Academy of Sciences); Polska Akademia Umiejętności (Polish Academy of Learning); Instytut Historii im. Tadeusza Manteuffla (Tadeusz Manteuffel Historical Institute) (eds.). Rostworowski Michał Jan. Polski słownik biograficzny (Polish Biographical Dictionary) (in Polish). Vol. XXXII. Kraków. pp. 221–224.
- Naumann, Max (1940). Die Plessen. Stammfolgen [The Plessen. Lineage] (in German). Görlitz.
- Niesiecki, Kasper; Bobrowicz, Jan Nepomucen (1839–1845a). Jan Paweł Korczak Łuszczewski. In:Herbarz polski (in Polish). Vol. 6. Lipsk. p. 293.
- PESz (1937). Polska Encyclopedja Szlacheka [Encyclopedia of the Polish Nobility] (in Polish). Vol. 6. Warsaw.
- Schnadel, Georg (1966). "Gümbel, Ludwig Karl Friedrich". In Historische Kommission bei der Bayerischen Akademie der Wissenschaften (ed.). Neue Deutsche Biographie. Vol. 18. Berlin: Duncker & Humblot. p. 258.
- Sellheim, Isabel (1989). Die Familie des Malers Friedrich Overbeck (1789–1869) in genealogischen Übersichten [The Family of the Painter Friedrich Overbeck (1789–1869) in Genealogical Schemata]. Deutsches Familienarchiv (in German). Vol. 104. Limburg an der Lahn: C.A.Starke. ISBN 3-7686-5091-X.
- Sierotwiński, Stanisław (1967–1968a). Polska Akademia Nauk (Polish Academy of Sciences); Polska Akademia Umiejętności (Polish Academy of Learning); Instytut Historii im. Tadeusza Manteuffla (Tadeusz Manteuffel Historical Institute) (eds.). Komierowski Jan Wacław. Polski słownik biograficzny (Polish Biographical Dictionary) (in Polish). Vol. XIII. Kraków. pp. 390–391.
- Sierotwiński, Stanisław (1967–1968b). Polska Akademia Nauk (Polish Academy of Sciences); Polska Akademia Umiejętności (Polish Academy of Learning); Instytut Historii im. Tadeusza Manteuffla (Tadeusz Manteuffel Historical Institute) (eds.). Komierowski Ludomir. Polski słownik biograficzny (Polish Biographical Dictionary) (in Polish). Vol. XIII. Kraków. p. 392.
- Richter-Nentwig, Ursula (2008). Mein Vater und ich: Erinnerungen – Feldpostbriefe [My Father and I: Memories – Letters from the Front]. Erzählen ist Erinnern (in German). Vol. 86. Volksbund.de.
- Uruski, Seweryn (1909). Rodzina Herbarz Sylachty Polskiej [Family Register of the Polish Nobility] (in Polish). Vol. 6. Warsaw.
- Valtin, Jan (2004). Out of the Night: The Memoir of Richard Julius Herman Krebs Alias Jan Valtin. AK Press. ISBN 9781902593869.
- Więckowska, Helena (1972). Polska Akademia Nauk (Polish Academy of Sciences); Polska Akademia Umiejętności (Polish Academy of Learning); Instytut Historii im. Tadeusza Manteuffla (Tadeusz Manteuffel Historical Institute) (eds.). Lelewel Jan Paweł. Polski słownik biograficzny (Polish Biographical Dictionary) (in Polish). Vol. XII. Kraków. pp. 19–21.
- Winckler, Johann Dietrich (1768). Overbeck, Caspar Nicolaus. Nachrichten von Niedersächsischen berühmten Leuten und Familien (Notices about Famous People and Families from Lower-Saxony). Vol. 1. Hamburg: Nicolaus Conrad Wörmer. pp. 220–232.
- Zedler, Johann Heinrich, ed. (1740f). Gesnerus, Salomon. In: Grosses vollständiges Universal-Lexicon (in German). Vol. 10. Leipzig: Johann Heinrich Zedler. pp. 1292–1293.
- Zedler, Johann Heinrich, ed. (1740a). Naumann, Franz Rudolph von. In: Grosses vollständiges Universal-Lexicon (in German). Vol. 23. Leipzig: Johann Heinrich Zedler. pp. 1289–1291.
- Zedler, Johann Heinrich, ed. (1740b). Naumann, Johann Christoph von (Obrister). In: Grosses vollständiges Universal-Lexicon (in German). Vol. 23. Leipzig: Johann Heinrich Zedler. pp. 1291–1292.
- Zedler, Johann Heinrich, ed. (1740c). Naumann (von). In: Grosses vollständiges Universal-Lexicon (in German). Vol. 23. Leipzig: Johann Heinrich Zedler. pp. 1287–1289.
- Zedler, Johann Heinrich, ed. (1740d). Werenberg, Bernhard. In: Grosses vollständiges Universal-Lexicon (in German). Vol. 55. Leipzig: Johann Heinrich Zedler. pp. 345–348.
- Zedler, Johann Heinrich, ed. (1740e). Werenberg, Heinrich Jonathan. In: Grosses vollständiges Universal-Lexicon (in German). Vol. 55. Leipzig: Johann Heinrich Zedler. pp. 346–348.
- Zedler, Johann Heinrich, ed. (1740g). Wetken, Johann. In: Grosses vollständiges Universal-Lexicon (in German). Vol. 55. Leipzig: Johann Heinrich Zedler. p. 998.
- Zernicki-Szeliga, E. von (1900). Der Polnische Adel und die demselben hinzugetretenen andersländischen Adelsfamilien, Generalverzeichnis [The Polish Nobility and the Foreign Noble Families who joined them, General Register] (in German). Vol. 1. Hamburg.
- Zürcher, Christoph. "Jan Pawel Lelewel". Historisches Lexikon der Schweiz (HLS) (Historical Dictionary of Switzerland).

=== General literature ===
- Ein Hamburger (1827). Hamburg wie es war und ist: Oder Ursprung, Entwicklung, Bestand, Orts-Beschreibung, Regierung, Sitten, Gebräuche und Merkwürdigkeiten von Hamburg und seinem Gebiete [Hamburg as it was and is: Or Origin, Development, Constancy, Geographical Description, Government, Conventions, Traditions and Curiosities of Hamburg and its Territory] (in German). Hamburg: P.F.L. Hoffmannsche Buchhandlung.
- Fahl, Andreas (1987). Das Hamburger Bürgermilitär 1814–1868 [The Hamburg Citizen Militia] (in German). Berlin and Hamburg: Reimer.
- Schramm, Percy Ernst (1969). Hamburg und die Adelsfrage (bis 1806) [Hamburg and the Nobility Question (until 1806)]. Zeitschrift des Vereins für Hamburgische Geschichte (in German). Vol. 55.
- Schramm, Percy Ernst (1964). Hamburg. Ein Sonderfall in der Geschichte Deutschlands. Hamburg.
- Schulz, Andreas (2002). Vormundschaft und Protektion: Eliten und Bürger in Bremen 1750–1880 [Paternalism and Protectionism: Elites and Citizens in Bremen 1750-1880] (in German).
- Wegner, Matthias (1999). Hanseaten. Berlin. ISBN 3-886-80661-8.
- Wiegand, Frank-Michael (1987). Die Notabeln: Untersuchungen zur Geschichte des Wahlrechts und der gewählten Bürgerschaft in Hamburg 1859-1919 [The Notables: Studies on the history of the right to vote and the elected Parliament in Hamburg 1859-1919] (in German). Hamburg: Verein für Hamburgische Geschichte. ISBN 3-923-35614-5.

== Films ==
- Architecture MMXII (2013). Potsdamer Stadtschloss (Potsdam City Palais) (Video documentation). Archived from the original on 2021-12-13. (→ The reconstruction of the Potsdamer Stadtschloss (Potsdam City Palace) – completed in 2013 – around the old palace's Fortuna Gate, which was initiated by Günther Jauch, who donated the reconstruction of the Fortuna Gate in 2000–2001.)
- Breloer, Heinrich and Königstein, Horst (Directors) (1982). Das Beil von Wandsbek [The Axe of Wandsbek] (Television production) (in German). (→ Heinrich Jauch, First State Attorney at Hamburg and the persecution of the Red Marine.)
- Aaron Davis (director, screenplay, producer, narrator) (2007). Operation Anthropoid Part 2 (= The Manhunt after the Operation Anthropoid) (Video documentation). Archived from the original on 2021-12-13. (→ 700 Waffen-SS soldiers under the command of descendant Generalleutnant Karl Fischer von Treuenfeld laying siege to the Cathedral of Saints Cyril and Methodius in Prague with Fischer von Treuenfeld inspecting the first dead paratroopers at 2:34.)
- Footage unveils U-boat secrets. Underwater footage from the wreck of a German U-boat sunk more than 90 years ago has been released (Television broadcast). 2009-03-30. (→ SM U-40 (Germany), whose second officer lieutenant Rudolf Jauch died in the sinking.)
- Hajo Schomerus (director, screenplay and camera) (2010). Im Haus meines Vaters sind viele Wohnungen [In my Father's house there are many rooms] (Documentary film (trailer)) (in German). Archived from the original on 2010-05-28. (→ Father Robert Jauch OFM, at the time living in the Church of the Holy Sepulchre in Jerusalem, in which the control of the building is shared between several Christian churches in complicated arrangements, essentially unchanged for centuries (Latin: status quo), provides an insight into his, Roman Catholic, perspective of the life in the church.)
- Hendrik Thoma (director and interviewer) (2014). Das Rieslingerbe des Günther Jauch [The Riesling-heritage of Günther Jauch] (Videotape) (in German). (→ Günther Jauch explains the history and the Riesling wine of his Von Othegraven Winery.)
- videohai02 (2013). Potsdam neuer Garten, das Marmorpalais [Potsdam New Garden Marble Palais] (Video documentation) (in German). Archived from the original on 2021-12-13. (→ The Marmorpalais (Marble Palace) at Potsdam on the shores of the Heiliger See (Holy Lake), situated directly opposite to the Villa Jauch on the shores of the lake. Since April 14, 2006 all 40 rooms have been renovated and opened to the public, Günther Jauch starting the renovation with a donation for the roof repairs.)
