= Miodowa Street (painting) =

Painting by Bernardo Bellotto

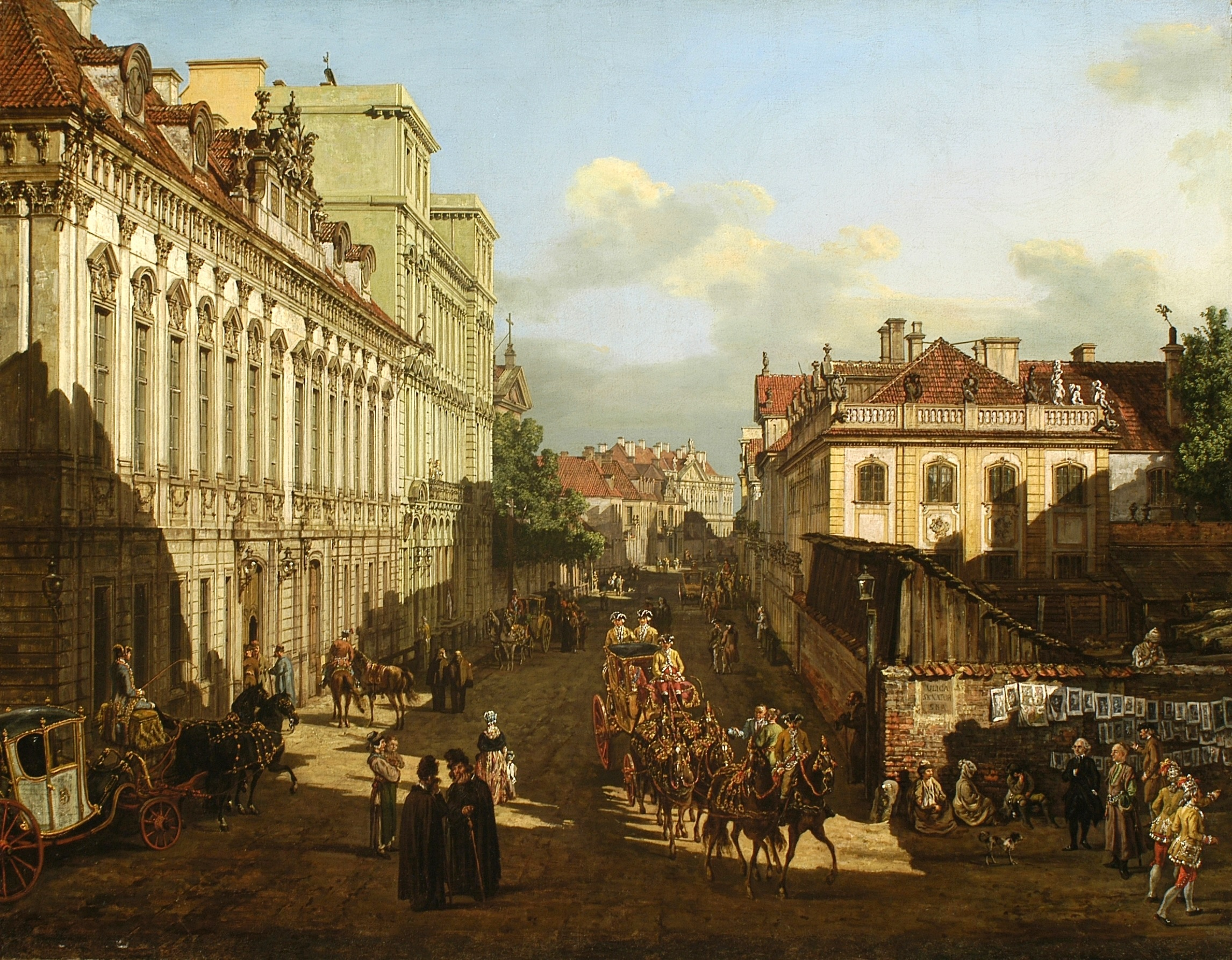
- Artist: Bernardo Bellotto
- Year: 1777
- Medium: oil on canvas
- Dimensions: 84 cm × 107.5 cm (33 in × 42.3 in)
- Location: National Museum; Warsaw

Miodowa Street (Polish - Ulica Miodowa) is an oil-on-canvas painting by the Italian artist Bernardo Bellotto, from 1777. He was then court painter to Stanisław August Poniatowski, king of Poland. It is held in the Royal Castle, in Warsaw.

== History and description ==
The painting belongs to a series of twenty-two depictions of Warsaw by the artist and shows the junction of Miodowa Street with Senatorska Street (Ulica Senatorska). On the left is the Krakow Episcopal Palace and the now-lost 1774 Tepper Palace, designed by Ephraim Schröger. On the right is the Branicki Palace and the Krasiński Palace.

The series was housed in the Royal Castle until 1822 before being taken to Russia; it was returned to Poland in 1922. The painting of Miodowa Street was used as evidence for the reconstruction of the Branicki Palace and the Episcopal Palace after World War Two.

== Bibliography ==
- (in Polish) Malarstwo Polskie, AURIGA, Warszawa, 1984
