= Miodowa Street, Warsaw =

Coordinates: 52°14′50″N 21°0′35″E

Miodowa Street
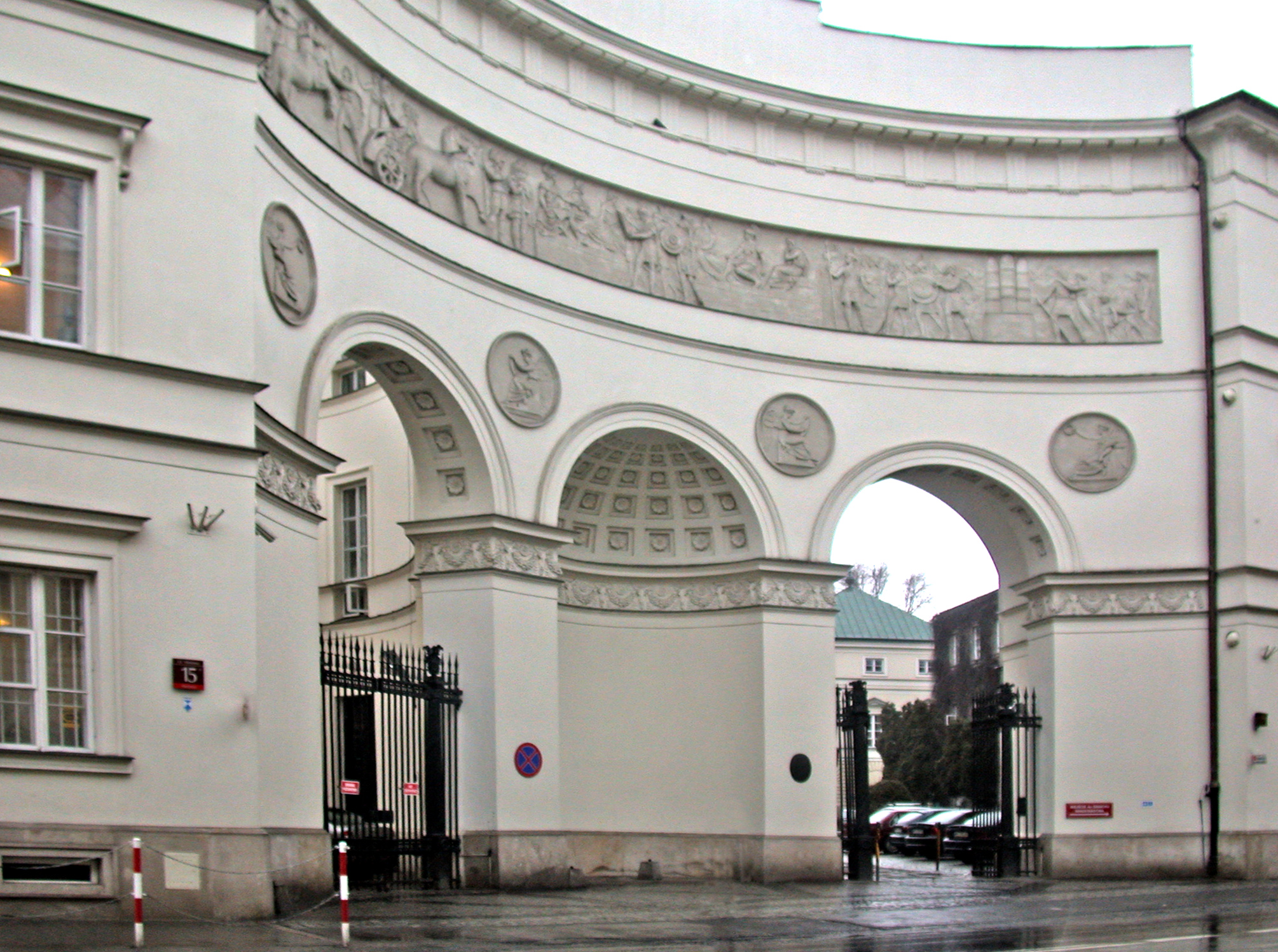
- Interactive map of Miodowa Street
- Location: Warsaw
- From: Krakowskie Przedmieście
- To: Długa Street (Long Street)

Construction
- Inauguration: around 15th century

Miodowa (lit. Honey Street) is a street in Warsaw's Old Town. More precisely, it links the Krakowskie (Cracow Suburb) Street in with Krasiński Square. It is also the name of a street in the Kazimierz district in Kraków.

== History ==
In the 16th century Miodowa Street was renowned for its gingerbread shops; hence its name. During the 18th century the Italian painter Bernardo Bellotto, better known as il Canaletto, the court painter for Poland's last king Stanisław August Poniatowski, painted with meticulous details the streets and architecture of 18th century Warsaw.

Canaletto painted a view of the street with all the hustle and bustle of its traffic. The buildings are, on the right, the palace of Crown Marshal Jan Klemens Branicki (built in 1740) and, on the left, the palace of the Bishops of Kraków (built in 1622, rebuilt between 1760 and 1762 by Jakub Fontana) and the mansion of the Warsaw banker, Piotr Tepper (built in 1774 according to design by Efraim Szreger, destroyed during the Warsaw Uprising and not rebuilt after the war). Further back can be seen the roof of the 17th-century church of the Capuchins, founded by King John III Sobieski (built between 1683 and 1694 by Tylman van Gameren), which bas a chapel containing the urn with his heart. Behind the chapel partially in front of the Krasiński Palace in the far distance can be seen on the left side the Lelewel Palace, another work of Efraim Szreger.

== Notable buildings ==
Miodowa Street is distinguished by its concentration of historic palaces, churches and institutional buildings, many of which were reconstructed after the Second World War. Its principal architectural landmarks include:

- No. 5 – Palace of the Bishops of Kraków, a 17th-century residence remodelled in the 1760s.
- No. 6 – Branicki Palace, an 18th-century Baroque palace complex with wings extending towards Podwale Street.
- No. 8 – Szaniawski Palace, an 18th-century residence subsequently altered in the 19th century.
- No. 10 – Młodziejowski Palace, also known as the Morsztyn Palace, which served as a residence of the Russian ambassador in the late 18th century.
- No. 13 – Church of the Transfiguration and Capuchin Monastery, founded by King John III Sobieski and containing a chapel with the king's heart.
- No. 14 – Chodkiewicz Palace, an aristocratic residence later used by craftsmen's organisations and commercial institutions.
- No. 15 – Pac Palace, originally a 17th-century residence remodelled in the Neoclassical style between 1824 and 1828; now the headquarters of the Ministry of Health.
- No. 16 – Greek Catholic Church of the Dormition of the Virgin Mary and Basilian Monastery, an 18th-century religious complex.
- Nos. 17–19 – Borch Palace, also known as the Archbishops' Palace, the residence of the Roman Catholic archbishops of Warsaw.
- No. 24 – Collegium Nobilium, originally established by the Piarists in the 18th century and now housing the Aleksander Zelwerowicz National Academy of Dramatic Art.

== Former buildings ==
- No. 7 – Tepper Palace, an 18th-century residence designed by Efraim Szreger for the banker Piotr Tepper. The building was destroyed during the Second World War and was not reconstructed during the construction of the Trasa W-Z tunnel.

== Gallery ==
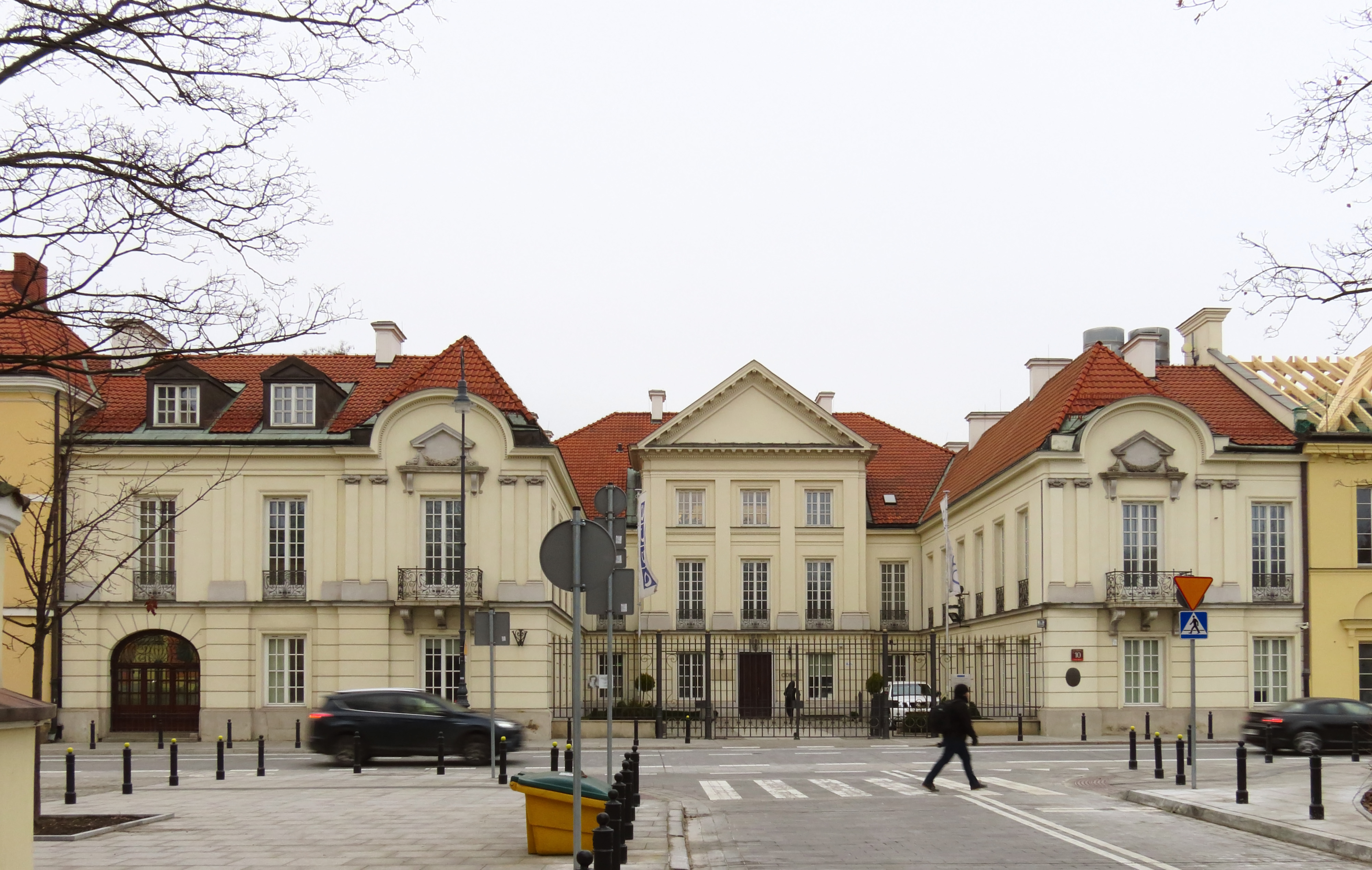
Młodziejowski Palace, the seat of ODIHR

=== Historical images ===
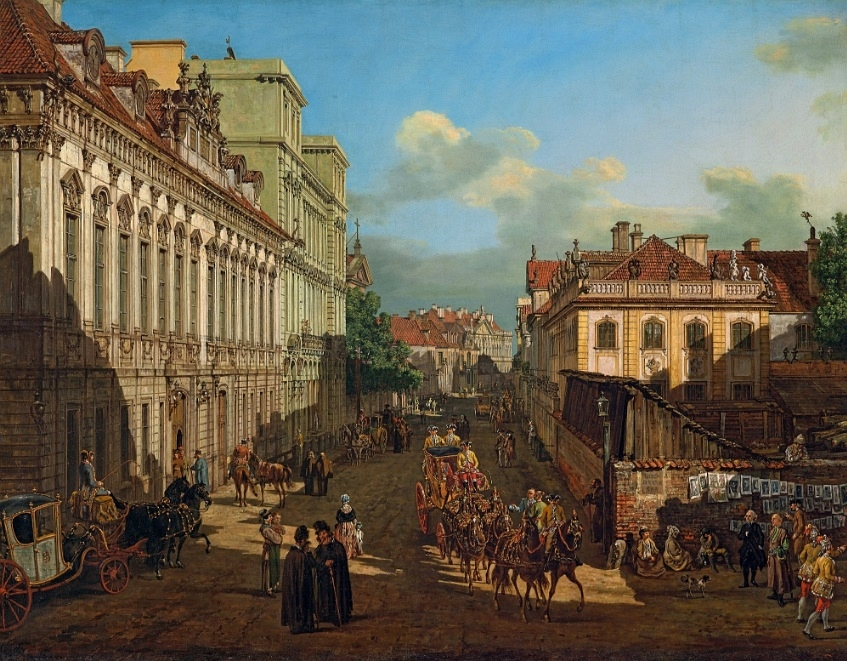
Miodowa Street by Bellotto, 1770

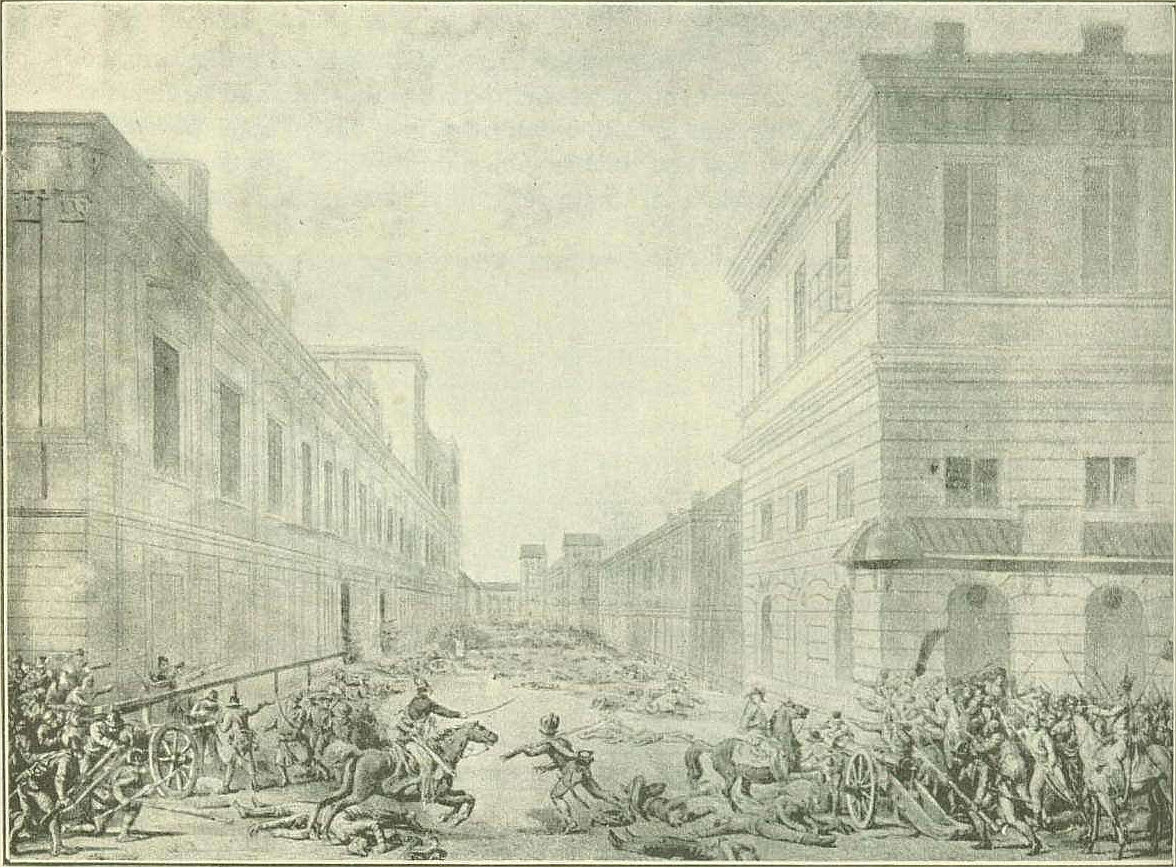
Fighting at Miodowa Street on Krakowskie Przedmieście, sketch by Jan Piotr Norblin, 1794

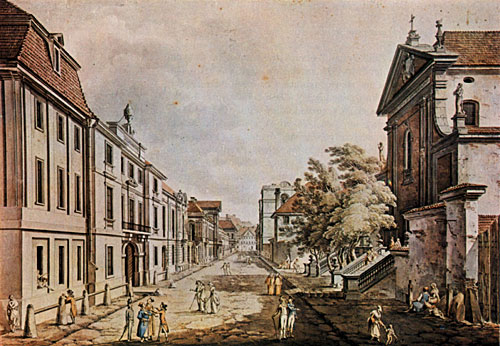
The Street by Zygmunt Vogel, 1795

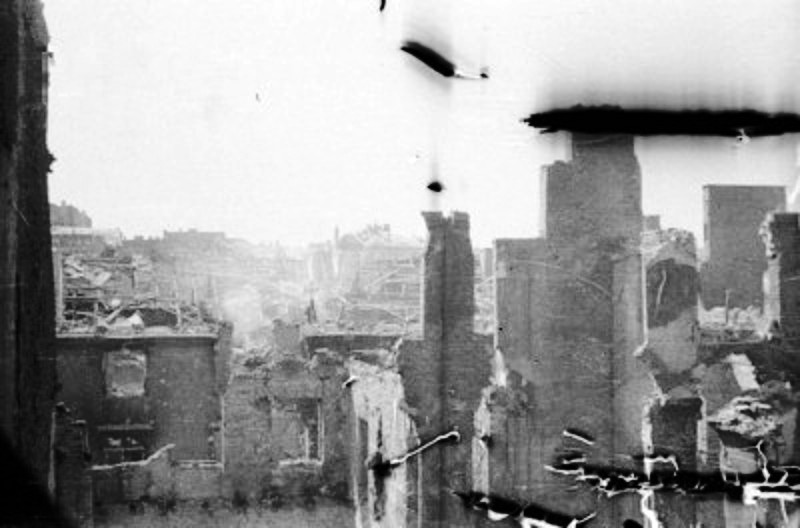
Warsaw uprising-Ruins of townhouses on the region of Miodowa and Senatorska Streets viewed from Podwale Street in the direction of Theatre Square.

=== Features (visible at the Canaletto painting) ===
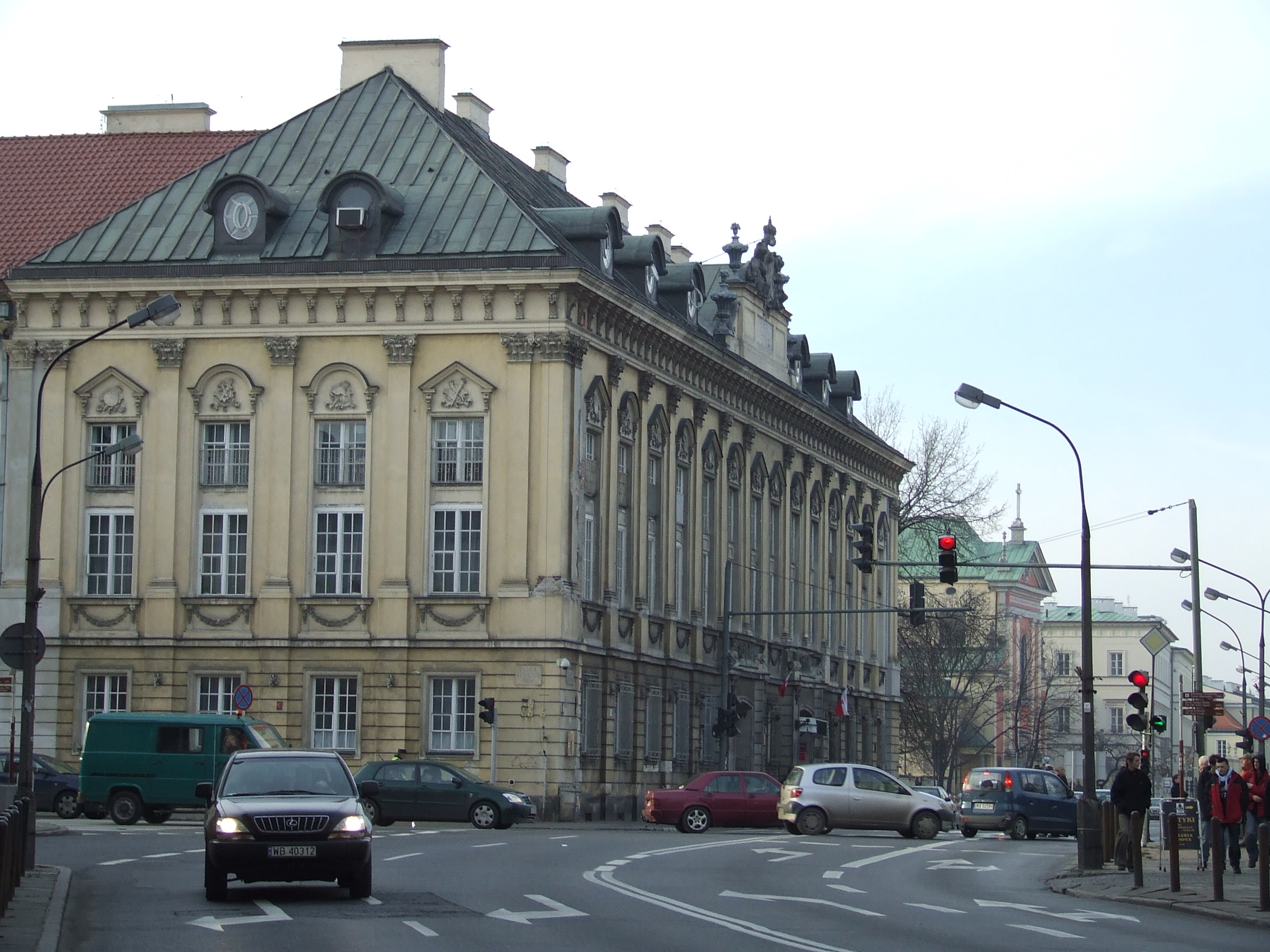
Kraków Bishops Palace

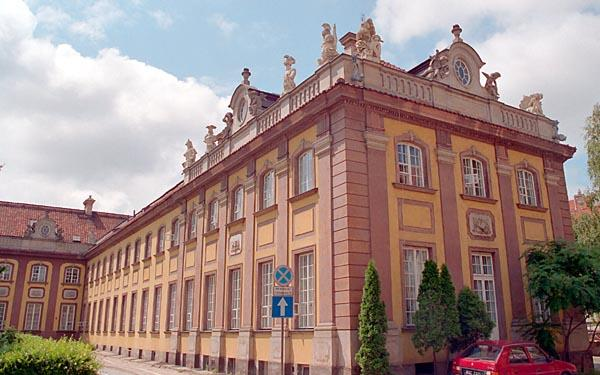
Branicki Palace

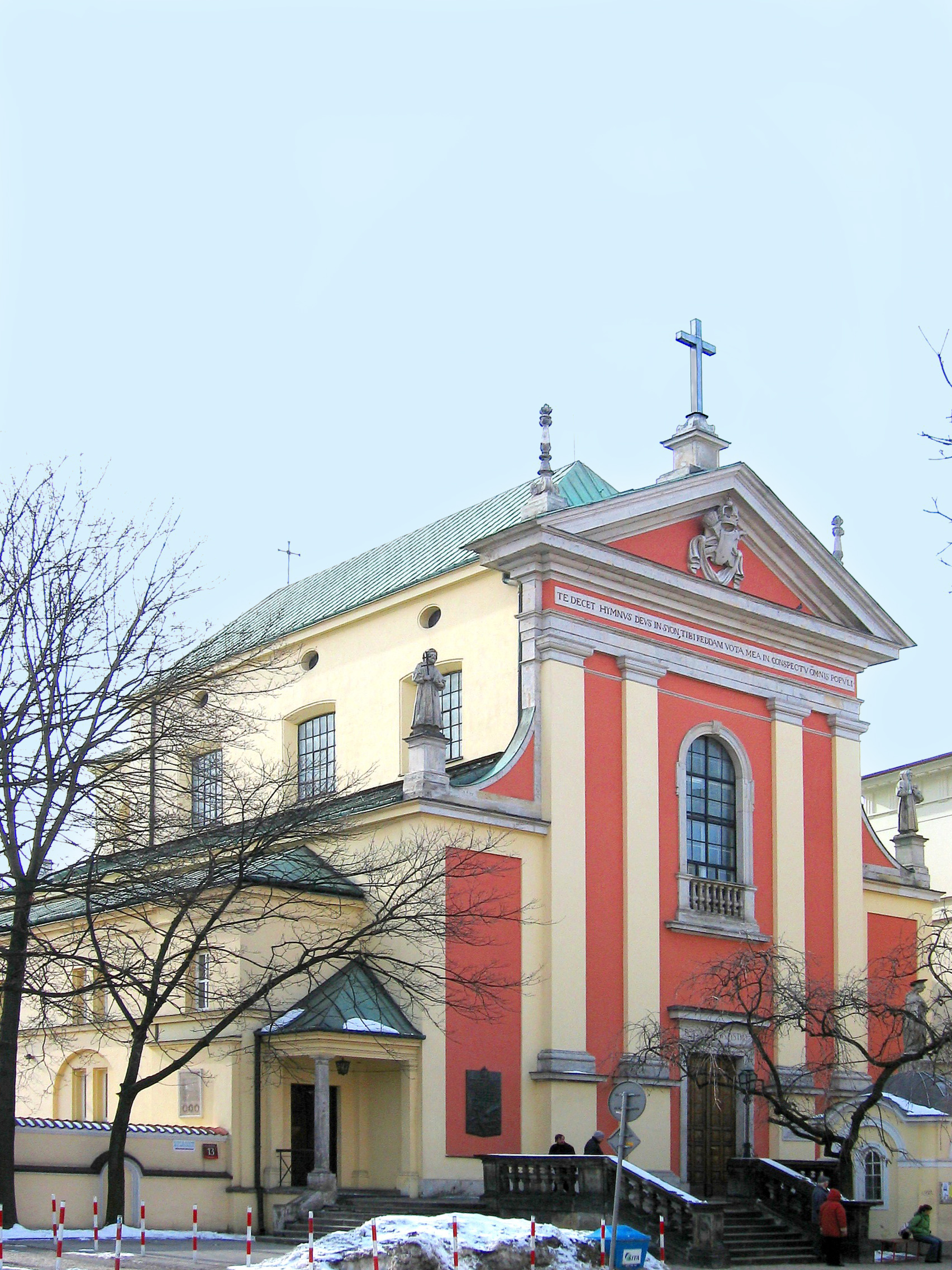
Capuchins Church
