= Chodkiewicz Palace, Warsaw =

Historic palace in Warsaw, Poland

Chodkiewicz Palace
- Pałac Chodkiewiczów
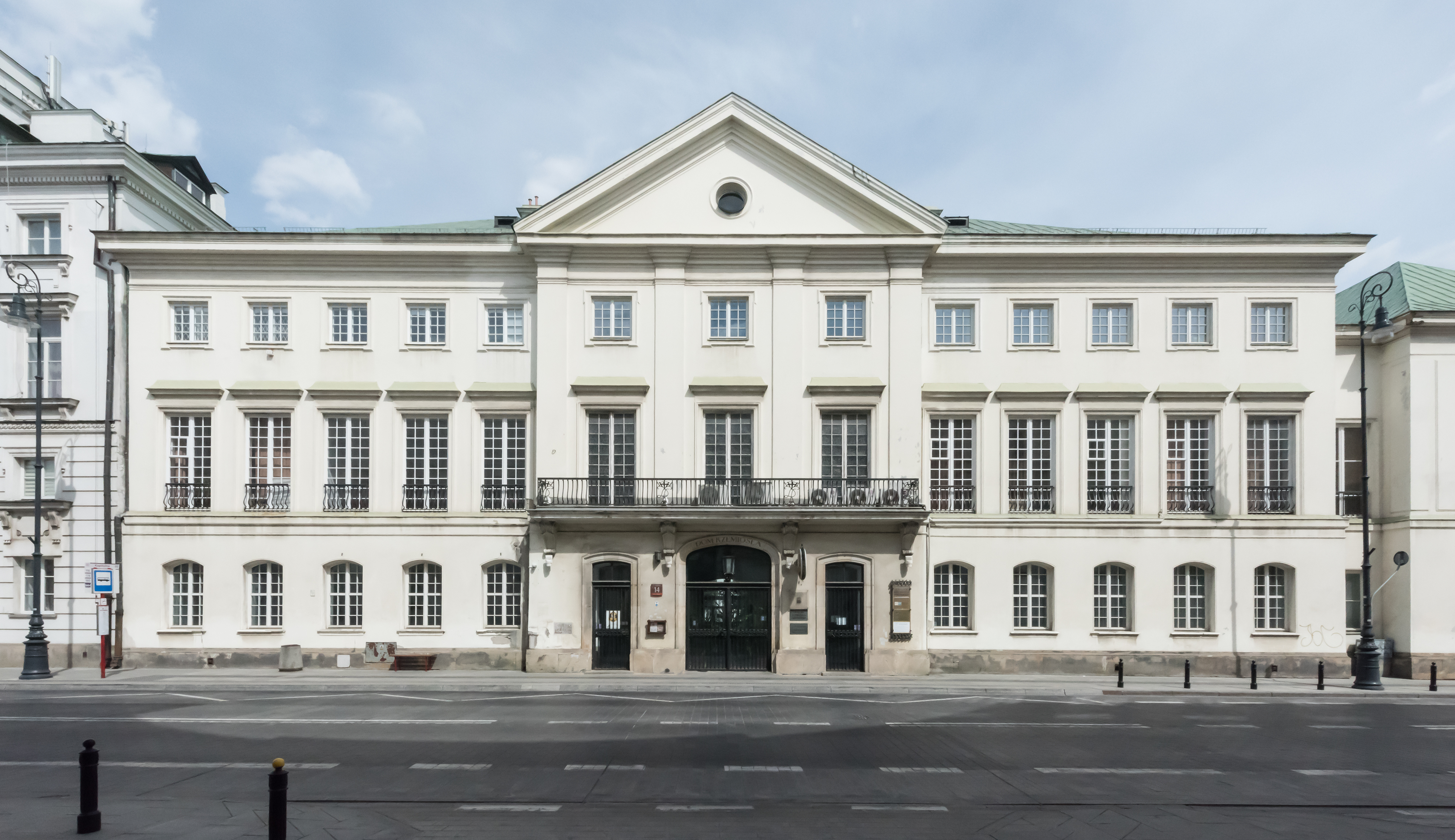
- Main façade of the palace in 2020
- Alternative names: House of Crafts

General information
- Type: Palace
- Architectural style: Rococo, Neoclassical
- Location: 14 Miodowa Street, Warsaw, Poland
- Coordinates: 52°14′50″N 21°00′33″E
- Renovated: 1947–1949 (postwar reconstruction)

Design and construction
- Architects: Józef Fontana (1757); Jan Bogusławski, Józef Łowiński (1947–1949)

Chodkiewicz Palace (Polish: Pałac Chodkiewiczów) or House of Crafts (Polish: Dom Rzemiosła) is a historic palace at 14 Miodowa Street in Warsaw, Poland. Originally built in the 17th century as a manor, it was remodelled in the 18th century in the Rococo style by Józef Fontana. Between 1790 and 1824, the palace belonged to the Chodkiewicz family.

The palace was largely destroyed during the Warsaw Uprising of 1944 and rebuilt in 1947–1949 to designs by Jan Bogusławski and Józef Łowiński. Since its reconstruction, it has served as the headquarters of Polish craft organisations, including the Polish Craft Association.

== History ==
The first residence on the site was mentioned in 1669. It was a manor house belonging to Cyprian Paweł Brzostowski, the Stolnik of Vilnius. Its next owner was Andrzej Kazimierz Giełgud, a Lithuanian dignitary. The property subsequently passed into the hands of the Czapski, Zyberk, Rzewuski and Ożarowski families. Around 1757, a subsequent owner, Jan Karol Mniszech, Lithuanian Chamberlain and Crown Huntmaster, commissioned the construction of a palace on the site to a design by Józef Fontana. The palace had a 13-bay façade featuring a projecting central section crowned by a triangular pediment, and a carriage entrance from Podwale Street.

From 1790 to 1824, the palace belonged to the Chodkiewicz family. During this period, its interiors were redesigned in the Neoclassical style by Stanisław Kostka Hoffman. Aleksander Franciszek Chodkiewicz operated a chemical laboratory in the palace. In 1818, together with Jan Siestrzyński he started first in Warsaw lithographic workshop. In the early 19th century, the ground floor of the left wing housed the Honoratka café, run by Honorata Cymermanowa. During the November Uprising, the café served as a meeting place for the Patriotic Society. The palace was renovated in 1852. It remained in private ownership until 1920, when it was purchased by the Association of Christian Craftsmen. In 1944, during the Warsaw Uprising, the building was set on fire and partially demolished.

It was reconstructed in 1948–1949, partially restoring its appearance from before the mid-19th century. The project was authored by Jan Bogusławski and Józef Łowiński. In 1956, Henryk Grunwald designed a decorative wrought-iron grille for the palace's entrance door. Today, the palace houses institutions of the Polish Craft Association, Vocational Training Centre, German-Polish Chamber of Industry and Commerce and an office of Germany Trade & Invest. Also the Honoratka restaurant is located in the basement.
