= Kraków Bishops Palace =

Kraków Bishops Palace or Palace of the Kraków Bishops may refer to:

- Bishop's Palace, Kraków
- Kraków Bishops Palace, Kielce
- Kraków Bishops Palace, Warsaw
