= Młodziejowski Palace =

Historic building in Warsaw, Poland

Coordinates: 52°14′50″N 21°00′38″E

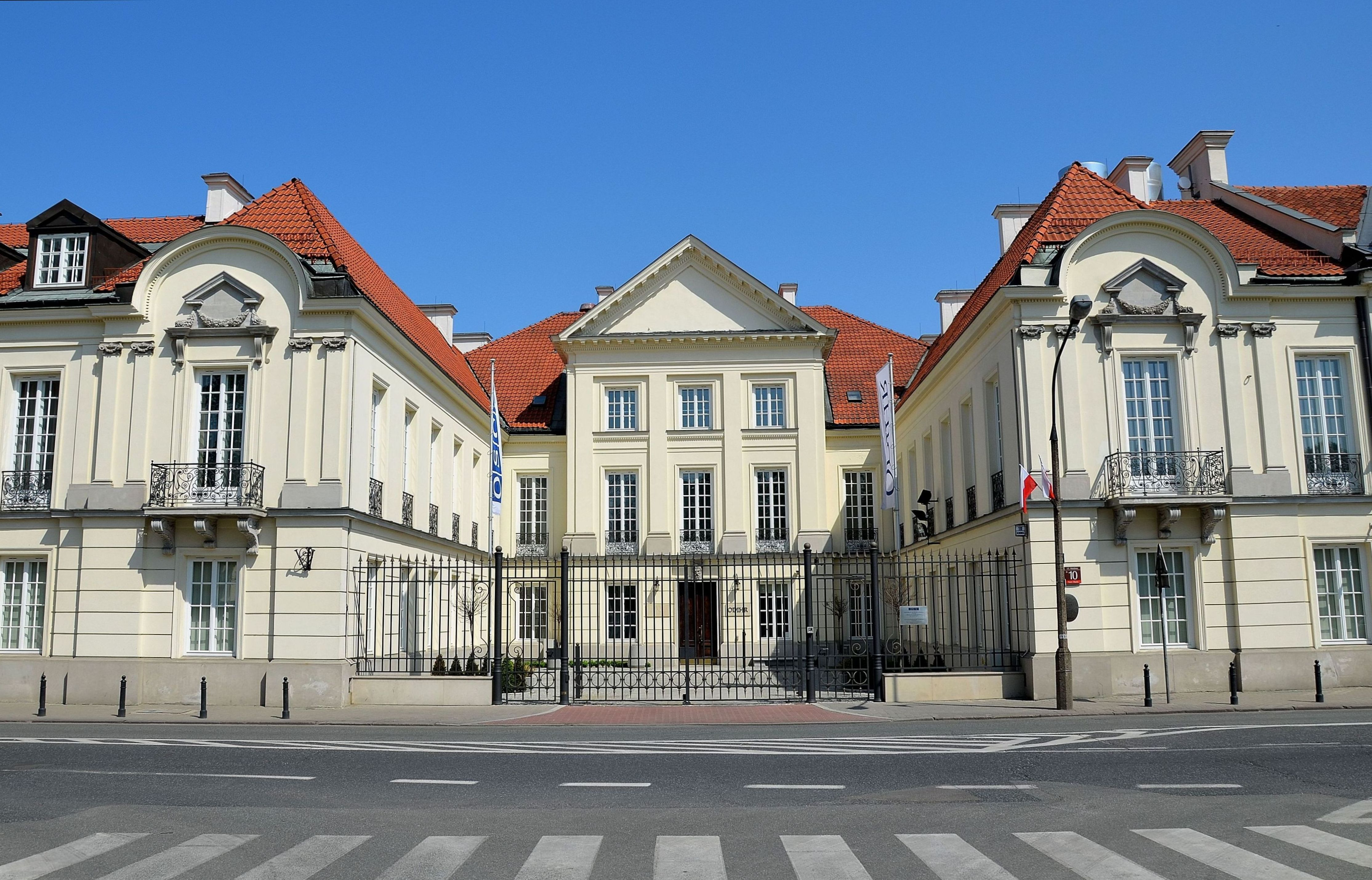
- Młodziejowski Palace in Warsaw, the seat of ODIHR
- Interactive map of the Młodziejowski Palace area

General information
- Architectural style: Neoclassical (1806–1808)
- Location: Miodowa Street 10, Warsaw, Poland
- Construction started: XVII century
- Client: Stanisław Morsztyn

Design and construction
- Architect: Jan Kacper Heurich

Historic Monument of Poland
- Designated: 1994-09-08
- Part of: Warsaw – historic city center with the Royal Route and Wilanów
- Reference no.: M.P. 1994 nr 50 poz. 423

Młodziejowski Palace (Polish: Pałac Młodziejowskiego, Polish pronunciation: [ˈpawat͡s mwɔd͡ʑɛjɔvˈskʲɛɡɔ], also the Morsztyn Palace, is a palace located in Warsaw at 10 Miodowa Street, with annexes at 7 Podwale Street. The palace was erected in the Baroque style at the end of the 17th century. It is adjacent to the Branicki and Szaniawski palaces.

== History ==
The palace erected at the end of the 17th century originally belonged to the Mazovian Voivode Stanislaw Morsztyn, later to the Sandomierz Voivode Stefan Bidzinski. It was built in the shape of letter E. From 14 July to 4 September 1707 it was visited by Tsar Peter I. In 1766 it was owned by the Bishop of Przemyśl, Andrzej Młodziejowski, for whom the palace was extended by Jakub Fontana before 1771. In the course of this extension, side aisles were created in the form of side wings connected by an arcade gallery supporting the terrace.

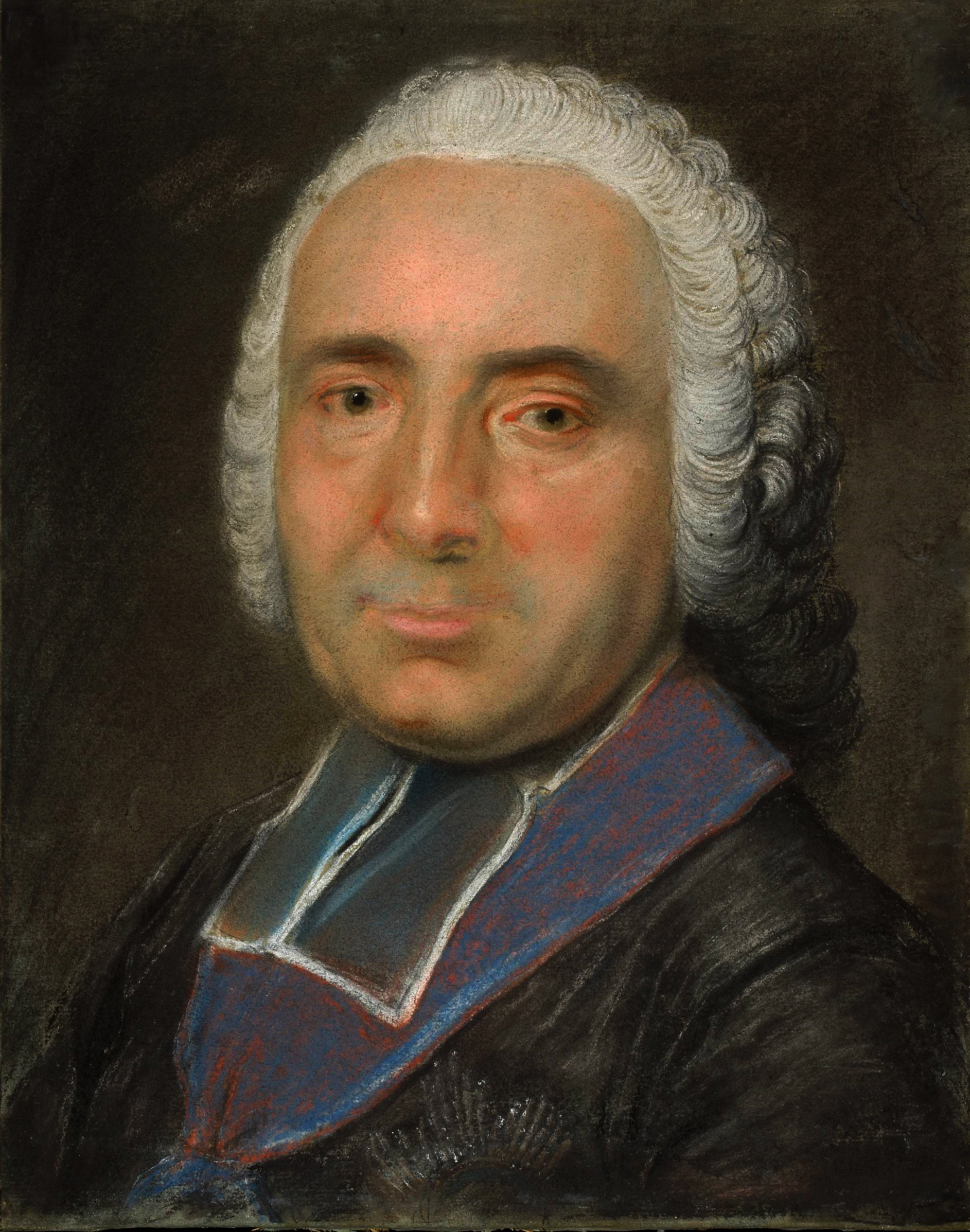
Andrzej Młodziejowski; portrait by Ludwik Marteau

In 1782 the Old Warsaw City Council put the palace up for sale because of the debt. In 1784, the Russian Metropolis was already inscribed as the owner. In the 1890s, the palace housed the Russian ambassador Osip Igelström who during the Kosciuszko Uprising was the target of attacks led by Jan Kiliński, and was destroyed.

In the years 1806-1808 it was rebuilt in the classicist style according to the design of Frederick Albert Lessel for Feliks Potocki and in the years 1808-1811 wings were built from Podwale Street. These pavilions, together with the outbuildings, formed a courtyard limited on the street side by iron rails. After 1818 the palace was owned by Karol Zeydler. From 1820 there was a Merchant Resursa, moved around 1829 to the Mniszchów Palace. Then there were bookshops and many stores in the palace. At the end of the 19th century, the building became a tenement house.

During World War II it was destroyed. During the works on reconstruction, the idea of restoring the building to its 18th-century form was accepted, which was connected with rejection of the 19th-century changes given by Frederick Albert Lessel. The reconstruction was completed in 1957 according to the design of Boris von Zinserling. After the war, it housed the headquarters of the State Scientific Publishing House, which in 2006 put the building up for sale.

Since 2011 the renovated palace has been the seat of the Office for Democratic Institutions and Human Rights of the Organization for Security and Cooperation in Europe.

== See also ==
- Architecture of Warsaw
- List of palaces in Poland
