= Jan Chryzostom Redler =

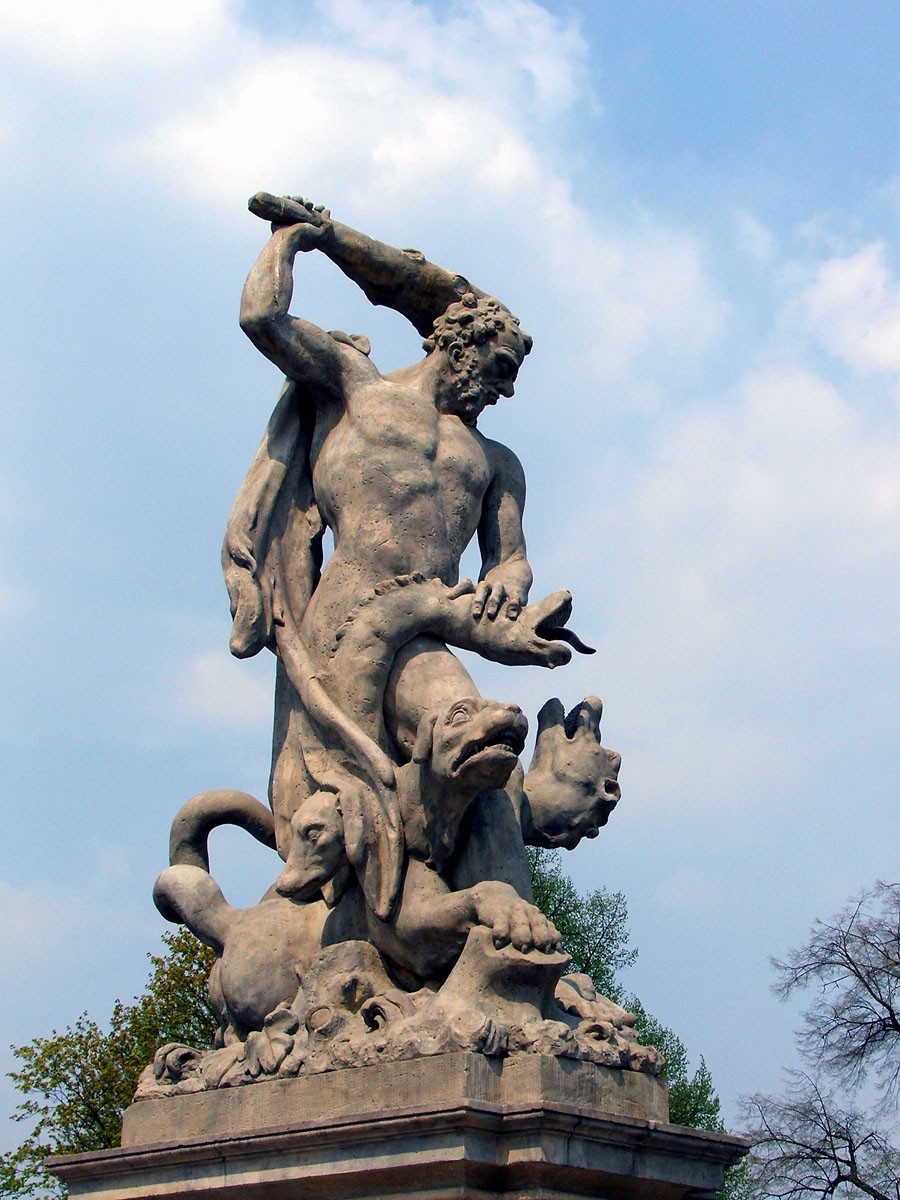
Gate statue of Heracles and Cerberus by Jan Chryzostom Redler, Branicki Palace, Białystok

Jan Chryzostom Redler, also Johann Chrysostomus Redler, (18th century) was a Polish sculptor. His exact date of birth or death is not known. He worked mainly in Warsaw and Białystok.

== Personal life ==
Redler was born probably in Silesia. In 1737 at the collegiate church in Warsaw Redler married Anne Marie Kitz. The witness at the wedding was another famous sculptor John George Plersch.

== Career ==
In 1743 he worked with carving decoration in the Branicki Palace, Warsaw of Jan Klemens Branicki. In 1745, he produced decorative work for the Czartoryski Palace in Puławy, including the creation of stairs parade. In 1749-1750 he made statues of the four evangelists to adorn the gates of Holy Trinity church in Tykocin.

In 1750 Redler was employed again by Branicki to do sculptural decorations of the Branicki Palace, Białystok. These included sculptures for the garden, interior staircase, and two other monumental sculptures: "Hercules fighting the dragon," and "Hercules fighting the hydra", which in 1757 is set between the initial and honorary courtyard. Around 1758 he created the statue of St. John of Nepomuk, which was set at the church in Szczyty-Dzięciołowo.

From 1752 to at least 1763 Redler performed in stages sculptural decorations for Potocki Palace in Radzyń Podlaski. He was also the author of unspecified work in 1755, 1757 and 1758 for Michał Fryderyk Czartoryski at Voŭčyn. The artist was also employed by King Stanisław August Poniatowski for the design and implementation of the Ujazdów Castle interior stucco decoration of the Royal Palace for the Hall of the Horse Guards Crown, the Grand Staircase and the Peace Marble.

Redler is credited with the authorship of several sculptures adorning the railing of the stairs connecting the garden terraces of the Wilanów Palace, as well as a maenad satire in front of the Palace featuring the Water and Satyr with a sundial in front of Little White House in the Royal Baths, the culmination of building facades Prażmowskich the Kraków suburb of Warsaw, decorated with sculptures in the garden arbor Primate's Palace Street. He was also responsible for sculptures adorning the facades of the gate at the Brühl Palace, Warsaw

== Style ==
Redler is one of the most important representatives of Warsaw rococo sculpture. He specialized in stone sculpture of secular characters, mainly mythological and allegorical sculptures, but also pursued sculpture in stucco and wood. He has collaborated with the architect Jakub Fontana, who is recognized as the designer of many of his works.
