= Lelewel Palace =

Coordinates: 52°14′54.6″N 21°0′22.32″E

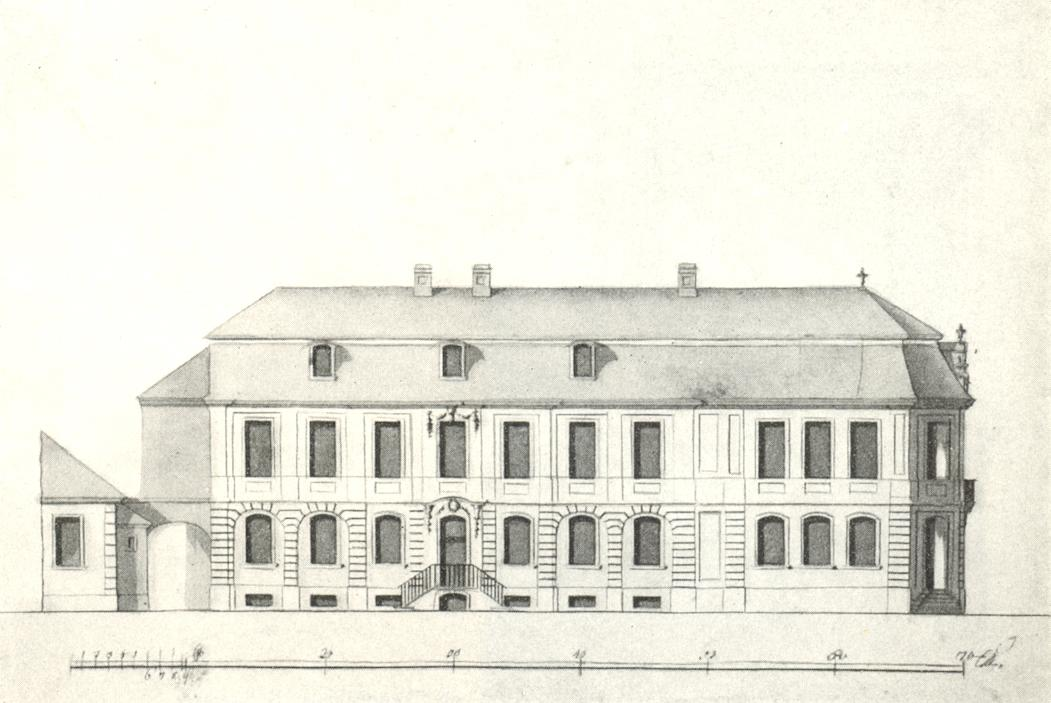
- Front elevation of the northern wing by Efraim Szreger.
- Interactive map of the Lelewel Palace area

General information
- Architectural style: Rococo
- Location: Warsaw, Poland
- Construction started: 1739
- Completed: 1740
- Demolished: 19th century (Szembek Mansion) after 1939 (whole complex)
- Client: Aleksander Szembek (Corps de logis), Constance Jauch (front building and secondary wings)

Design and construction
- Architects: Efraim Szreger (1755); Szymon Bogumił Zug (after 1787)

Lelewel Palace (Polish: Pałac Lelewelów) was a rococo palace on the Miodowa Street in the Warsaw Old Town, which was also unofficially named "Palace Street" (ulica Pałacowa). Lelewel Palace was built in 1755 by Efraim Szreger on an estate documented to have been property of King John III Sobieski and maintaining the original Corps de logis. The client and owner until 1787 was Constance Lelewel née Jauch.

== History ==
The original timber manor house of Krzysztof Gembicki, Grand Pantler of the Crown, that occupied the allotment was burned by Swedish and Brandenburgian forces during the Deluge. In 1662 it was replaced by another timber mansion of Stanisław Razicki, the king's secretary. The more permanent brick palace was erected between 1739 and 1740 for Aleksander Szembek, voivode of Sieradz. It was constructed as a French-style city palace with two outbuildings and a geometric garden. Around 1755 the palace was enlarged for the subsequent proprietor Swedish-Prussian aristocrat Heinrich Lölhöffel von Löwensprung (1705-1763), but of the planned two new wings only the northern wing was built. The new wing, connected with existing outbuildings and a neighbouring tenement house, become the main building of the palace.

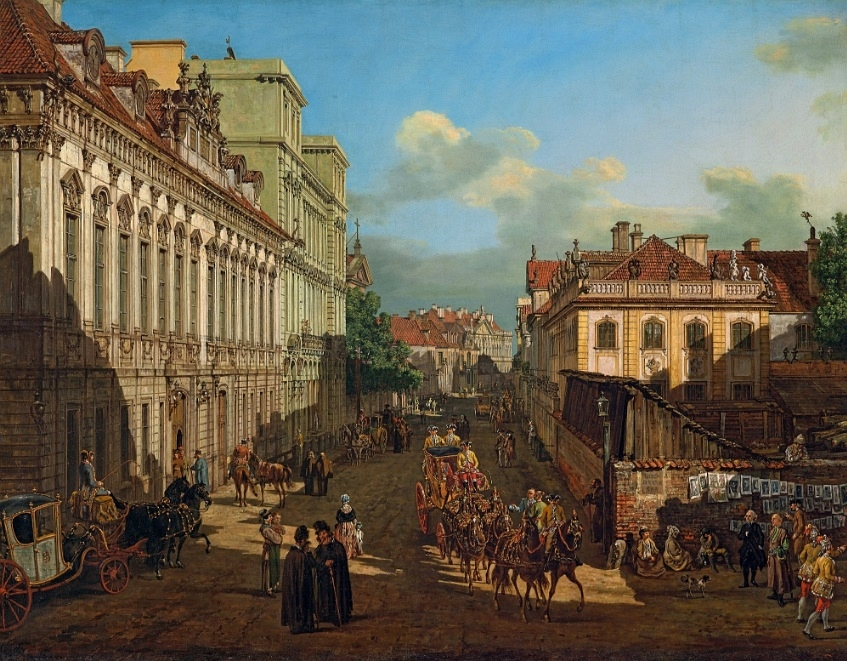
Miodowa street in the year 1770 by Bernardo Bellotto, il Canaletto, displaying left-hand at the very end of the street in front of the Krasinski Palace the Lelewel Palace

The real initiator of the reconstruction was Constance Jauch (1722–1802), the daughter of major general Joachim Daniel von Jauch (1668–1745). In 1741 she married Heinrich Lölhöffel, the privy councillor (Hofrat) and physician to King Augustus III of Poland.

After the death of her father, who had been German architect in attendance to King Augustus II the Strong and his son Augustus III, and who had supervised the baroque development of the city of Warsaw, she inherited a considerable fortune. Efraim Szreger had been an assistant to him, presumably the reason why he was chosen as architect. Constance Lelewel bought the former property of the voivode Franciszek Szembek at the corner of Miodowa and Długa Street in 1752, and in 1755 commissioned Szreger to build the Lelewel Palace in the Miodowa. It is documented in contemporary maps that the estate had belonged to King John III Sobieski, but this is questioned by some authors for stylistic reasons regarding the original construction. After the early death of her husband, in 1763, Constance lived in the palace until 1787, when she sold it to a rich merchant Henryk Jarzewicz. Jarzewicz enlarged and rebuilt the complex in neoclassical style according to a design by Szymon Bogumił Zug. Between 1850 and 1851 the separate buildings of the complex were merged and rebuilt for Lesser family. In the 19th century the original corps de logis, so-called Szembek Mansion, was pulled down and during the World War II the whole complex was completely destroyed by the Germans.

== Architecture ==
Szreger kept the original corps de logis (Szembek Mansion), and adjoined the front building and the side wings modelling the ensemble on the French Hôtel particulier which was known to him from the books of Pierre-Jean Mariette (1727 and 1738) and Jacques-François Blondel (1752). The drawings of the exterior and the interior are well-preserved. For the staircase he designed wall paintings which differ only in marginal details from the wall paintings in the staircase of the Appartement des Princes in the Palace of Versailles which will have been well known in Poland through engravings in the third volume of 1738 of Mariette's L'Architecture française. The left wing of the ensemble was added by the architect Szymon Bogumił Zug after Constance Jauch had sold the estate.

The construction is relevant for the history of architecture in Poland because it shows the influence of the baroque style of the Saxon building authority for which Szreger was working until he emerged as the most important exponent of neoclassical architecture in Poland.

== Images ==
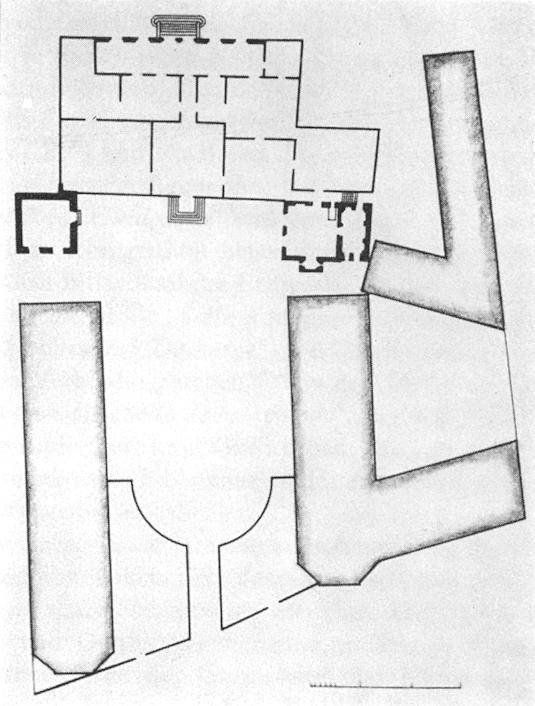
Overall plan

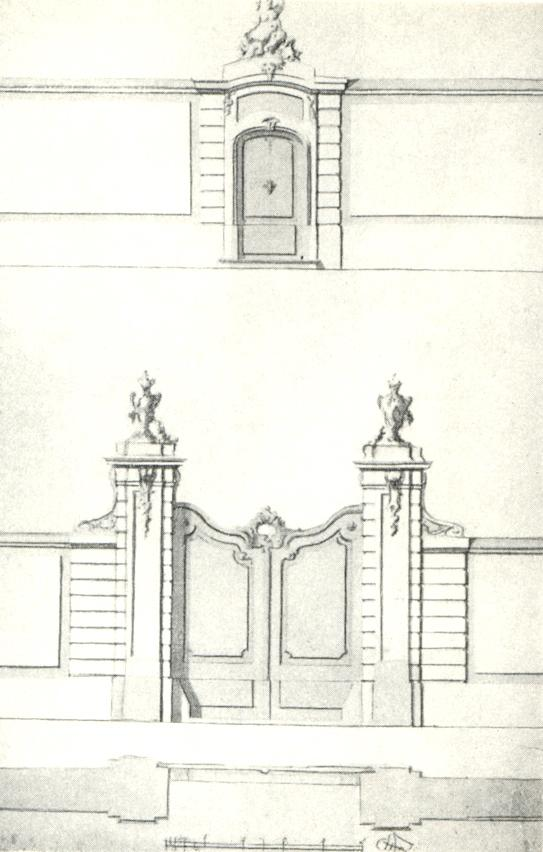
The main gate

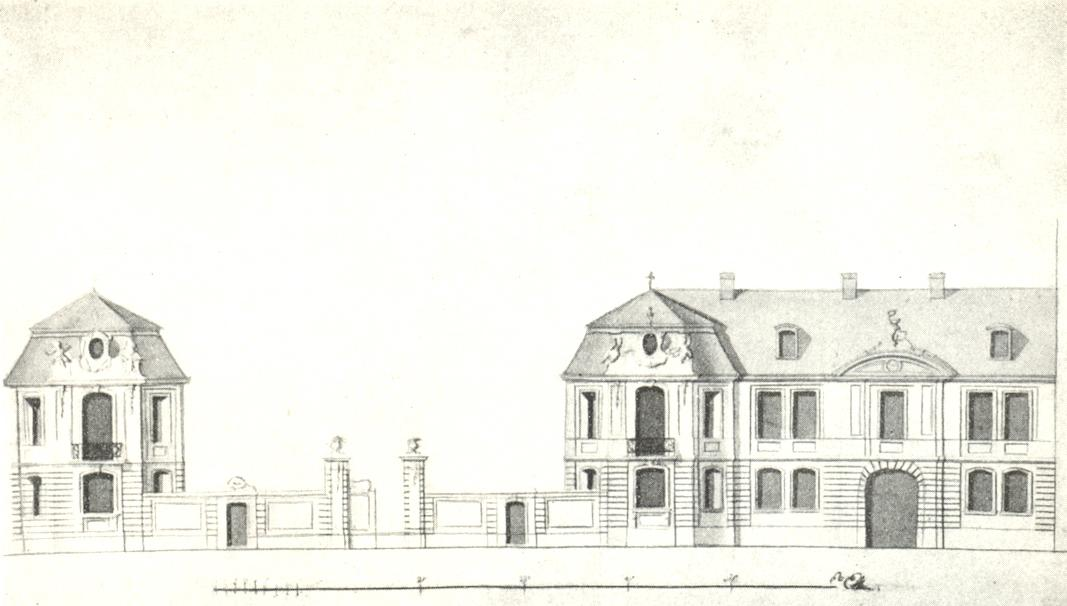
Outbuildings

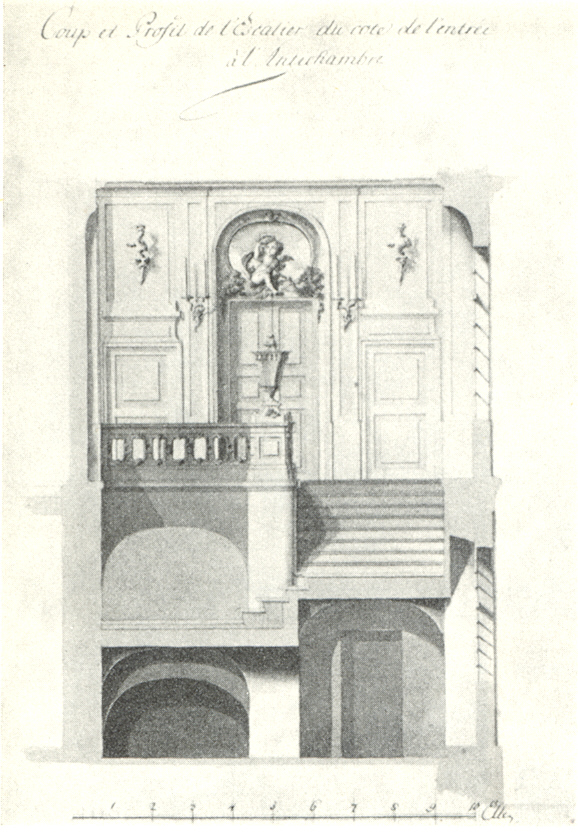
Stairway

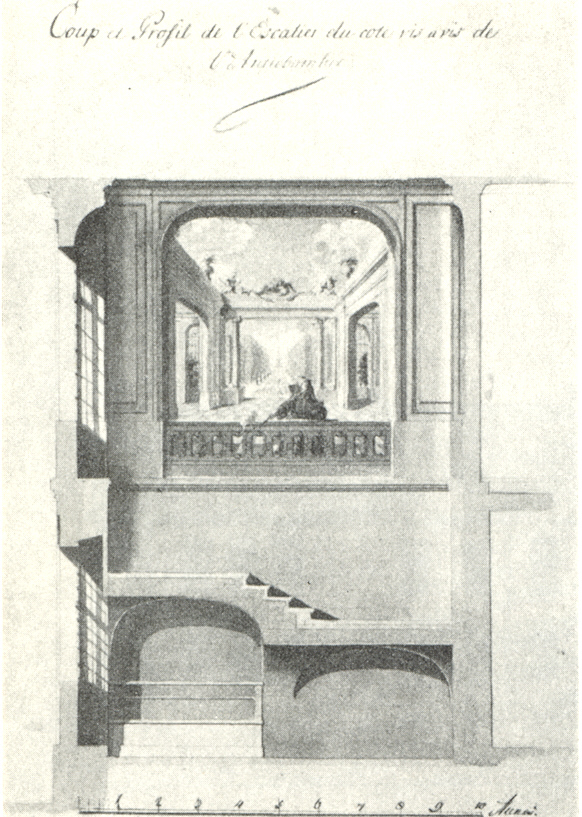
Stairway

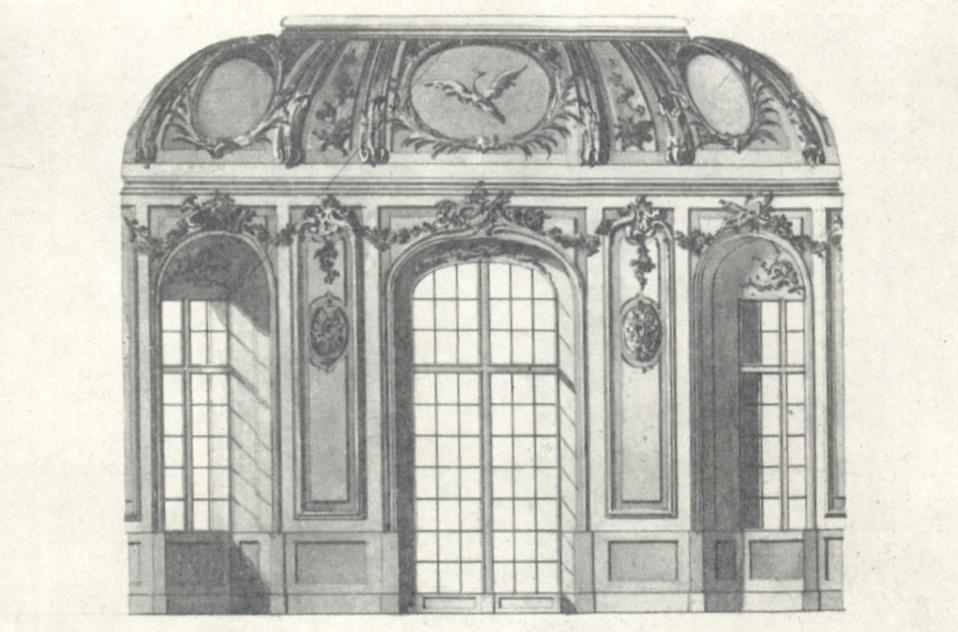
Ballroom

== See also ==
- Branicki Palace

== Literature ==
- Walter Hentschel: Die sächsische Baukunst des 18. Jahrhunderts in Polen, textbook, Berlin 1967, p. 425ff; illustrated book, Berlin 1967, pictures 578ff
- Stanislaw Lorentz: Der Architekt der Visitinerinnen in den Jahren 1754-1762 (Polish: Architekt P.P. Wizytek z lat 1754-1762), in: Biuletyn Historii Sztuki 21, 1959, p. 376-383
