= Jakub Fontana =

- Born: 1710; Szczuczyn
- Died: 13 April 1773 (aged 62–63); Warsaw
- Occupation: architect
- Notable work: Collegium Nobilium (Warsaw)

Jakub Fontana (1710 – 13 April 1773) was a Polish architect of Swiss Italian origin, a practitioner of the Baroque and Neoclassical styles. He was court architect to the Polish king. He was knighted in 1764. Jakub Fontana had a notable brother named Jan Kanty Fontana. His projects were influenced by Saxon Baroque, French Rococo and early Neoclassicism.

== Biography ==
Jakub Fontana was the eldest son of Józef Fontana, also an architect, who died in 1741. The first steps in his profession were under his father's guidance, as his assistant, and later as his collaborator. He was sent abroad from 1732 to 1736, to become acquainted with the finest architectural work in Italy, (northern Italy and Rome) and France (Paris). Having studied the latest trends and styles, he brought back with him stencils from which he drew inspiration for the rest of his professional life.

From 1710 to 1743, he was assigned to participate in the construction of the towers of the church of Matki Bożej Łaskawej i św. Wojciecha in Łowicz. Due to his (young) age, he could not be the author of the project. The façade had recently been designed by the architects Algirdas Zagorski, Kacper Bażanka and after his death in 1726, Jakub Fontana was hired to work for Józef Fontana in order to continue and complete the construction. Fontana made detailed drawings of the towers and undertook some adjustments to the details. These towers represent the type prevalent in Poland in the third decade of the 18th century. The architectural decoration of the aisles formed in a pillared layout can be attributed to Fontana, who designed them when he returned to Poland in 1737. However, in earlier constructions, he could only be considered as an assistant to his father.

Another project, in which he took part at his father's side, was the Franciscan church in Zakroczymska Street in Warsaw, consecrated in 1737. The design of the church was prepared by Jan Chrzciciel Ceroni. In 1750, only the church facade could be attributed to Jakub Fontana (the facade was later rebuilt by Józef Boretti in 1788). After the death of his father in 1741, Fontana took over the practice and all its workers. His projects from this period onwards attest to his being strongly influenced by his father's style of construction. Creatively independent work by Jacob Fontana started only in 1737, after he returned from the eye-opening trip to northern Italy, Rome, Paris and Vienna.

From 1742, the Grand Marshal of the Crown Franciszek Bieliński employed Fontana for major public and private projects. He was involved with many properties in the city of Warsaw. In 1743, a number of commissions included work for aristocratic clients, the monastery of Warsaw, and more. He was the designer of the Nobilium College (1743–1754), the hospital of St. Roch, and the church in Suraż.

Jakub Fontana was counted among the few esteemed Polish architects representing the Franco-Italian style. The 1750s were considered his most successful time as an architect. 1750 was a turning point in his career when he was hired by Jan Klemens Branicki to reconstruct the Branicki Palace, Białystok. For a short time, he was employed by Eustachy Potocki, when he was involved with his reconstruction of his Rococo palace in Radzyń Podlaski, then for the Lubomirski family, and the bishop of Załuski. Artists collaborating with Fontana included, sculptor and painter, Jan Jerzy Plersch, and sculptor Jan Chryzostom Redler.

After Stanisław August Poniatowski ascended the Polish throne, Fontana was appointed as the first architect to the king, undertaking major works relating to the Royal Castle, Warsaw and other important state buildings.

Fontana married the noblewoman, Magdalena Bartsch vel Barszcz, who, after Fontana's death, married Teodor Słomiński, around 1777.

== Main projects ==
- cooperation in the construction of the Copper-Roof Palace in Warsaw
- the Potocki palace in Radzyń Podlaski (1750–1758)
- cooperation in the building of a palace for the Sanguszko family in Zaslav
- reconstruction of the interior of the Royal Castle in Warsaw from (1751)
- erection of the Piarist Collegium Nobilium in Warsaw (1743)
- reconstruction of the Malachowski Palace in Warsaw (1750)
- reconstruction of the palace in Otwock Wielki (1750–1760)
- the Bernadine church in Góra Kalwaria (1755–1759)
- the Leszczyński (Prażmowski) house on the Krakowskie Przedmieście in Warsaw
- cooperation in the construction of the Paca-Radziwiłłów Palace in Warsaw
- cooperation on the Branicki Palace in Warsaw
- reconstruction of the Bishop's Palace in Warsaw (1760–1762)
- the stairs in the Branicki Palace in Białystok
- the facade of the Holy Cross Church in Warsaw (from 1753)
- re-modelling the palace of the Lubomirski's in Opole Lubelskie
- re-modelling of the altar inside the Cathedral Basilica of the Assumption and St. Nicholas in Łowicz (1641–1647)
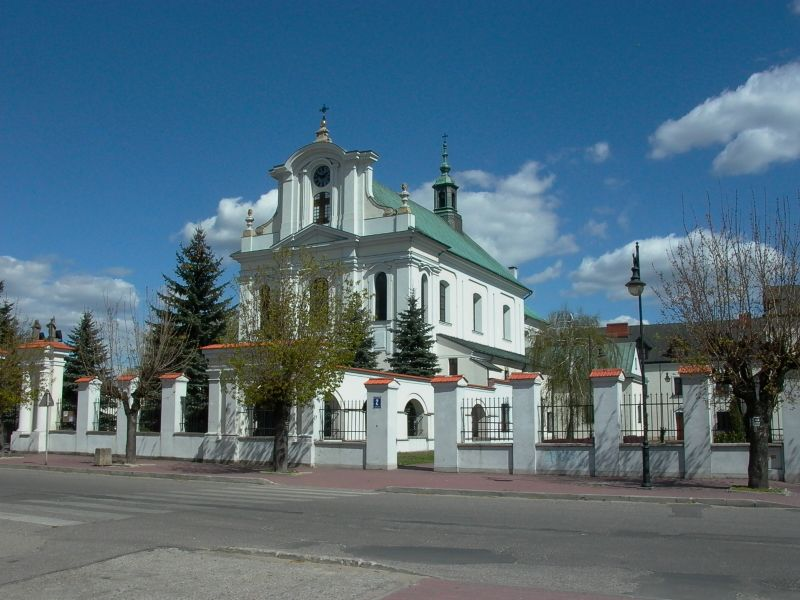
A church in Góra Kalwaria

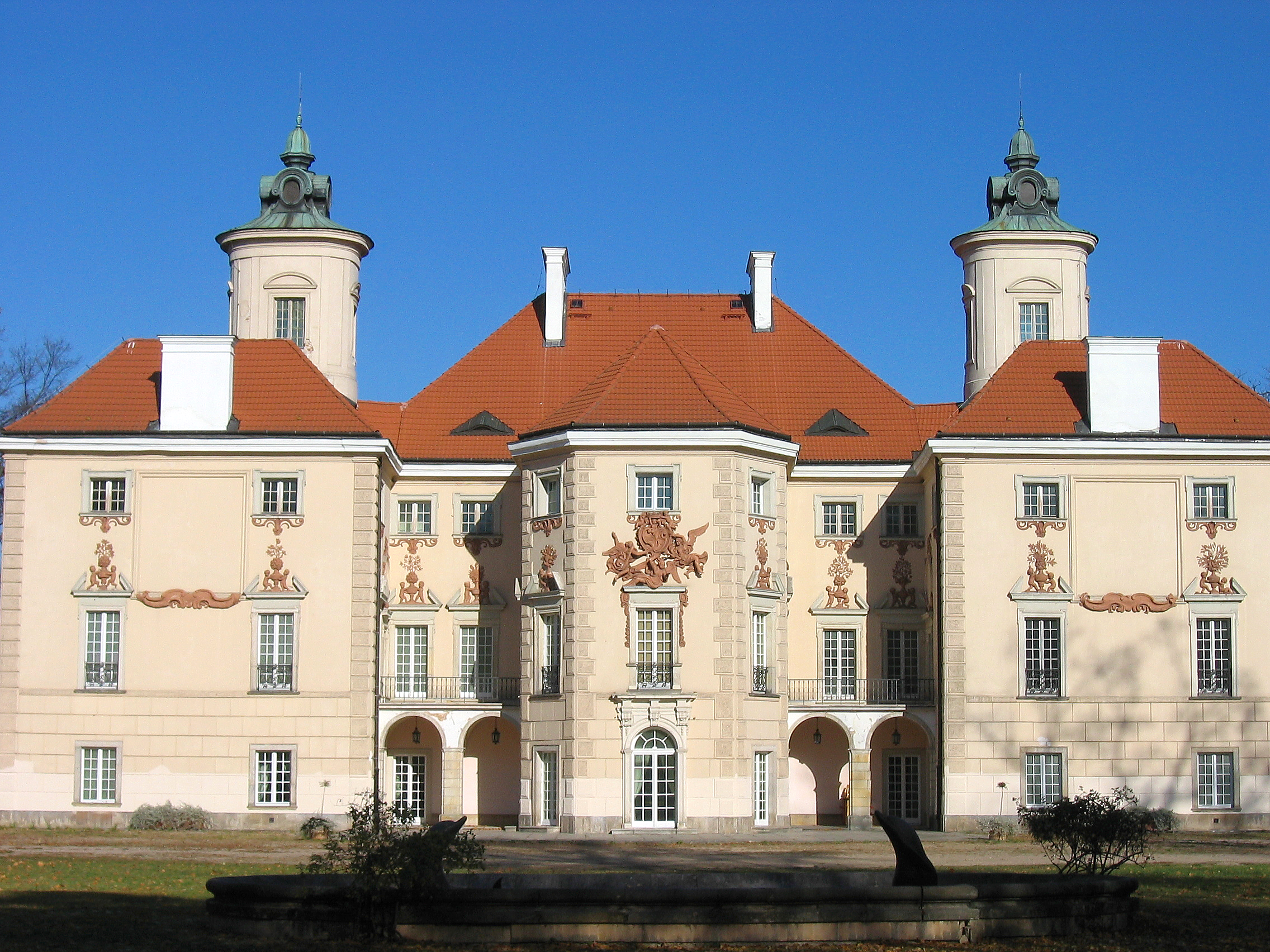
The palace in Otwock Wielki

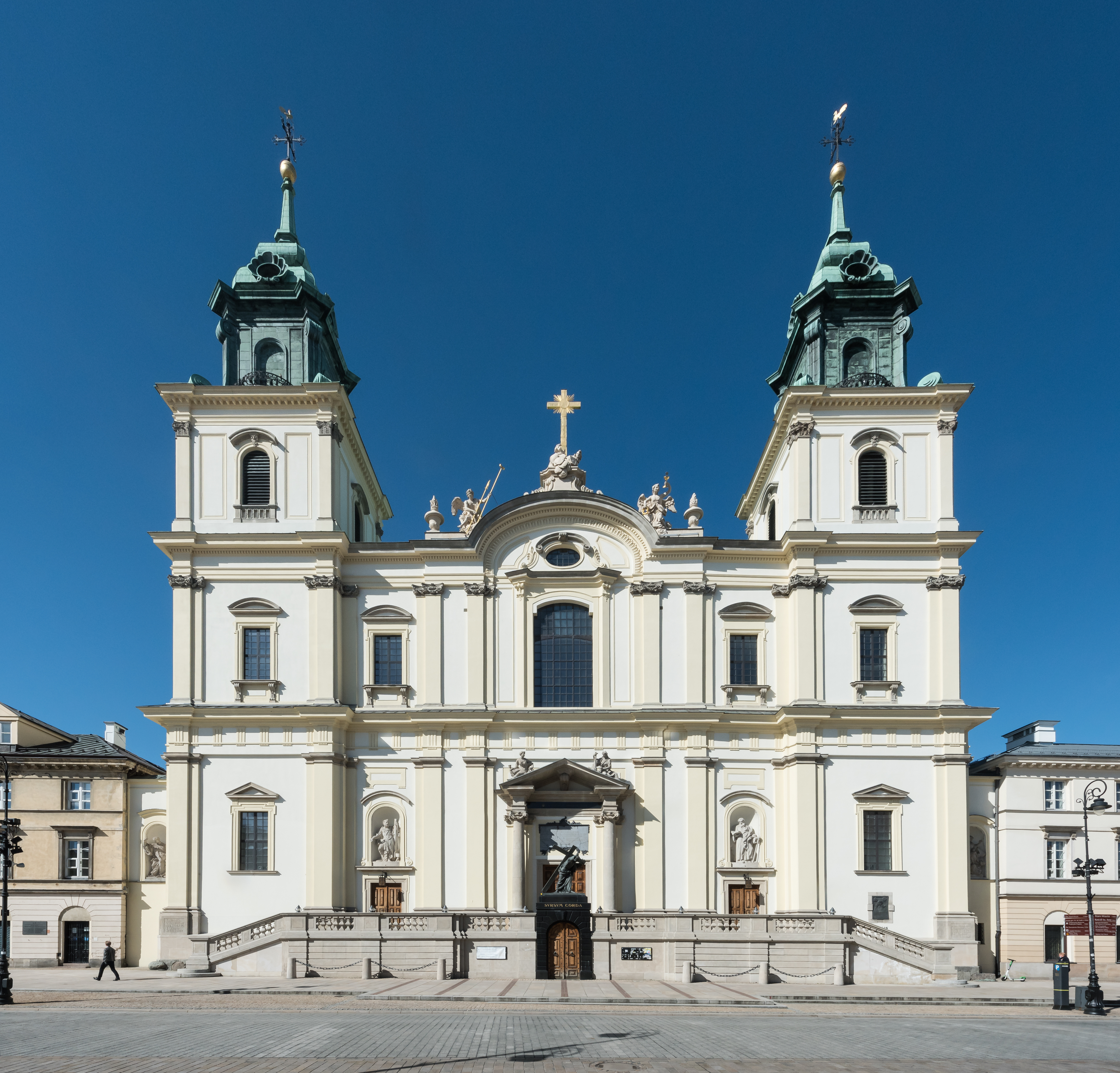
The Holy Cross Church, Warsaw in Warsaw

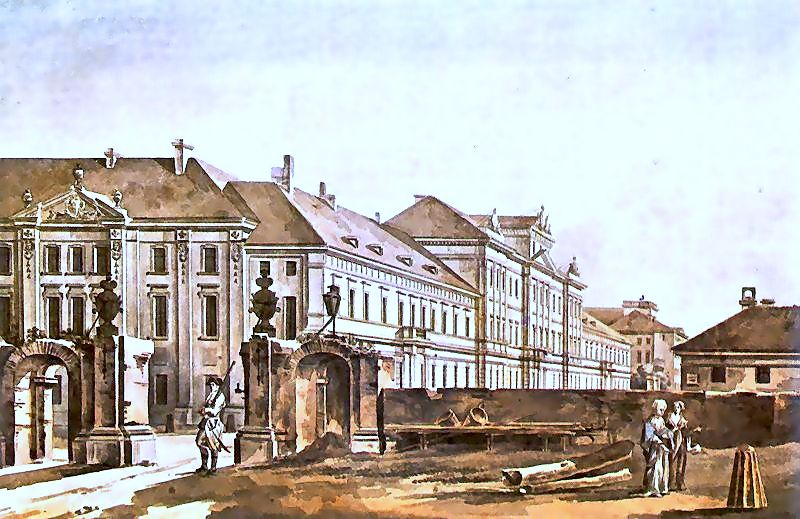
The Collegium Nobilium in Warsaw

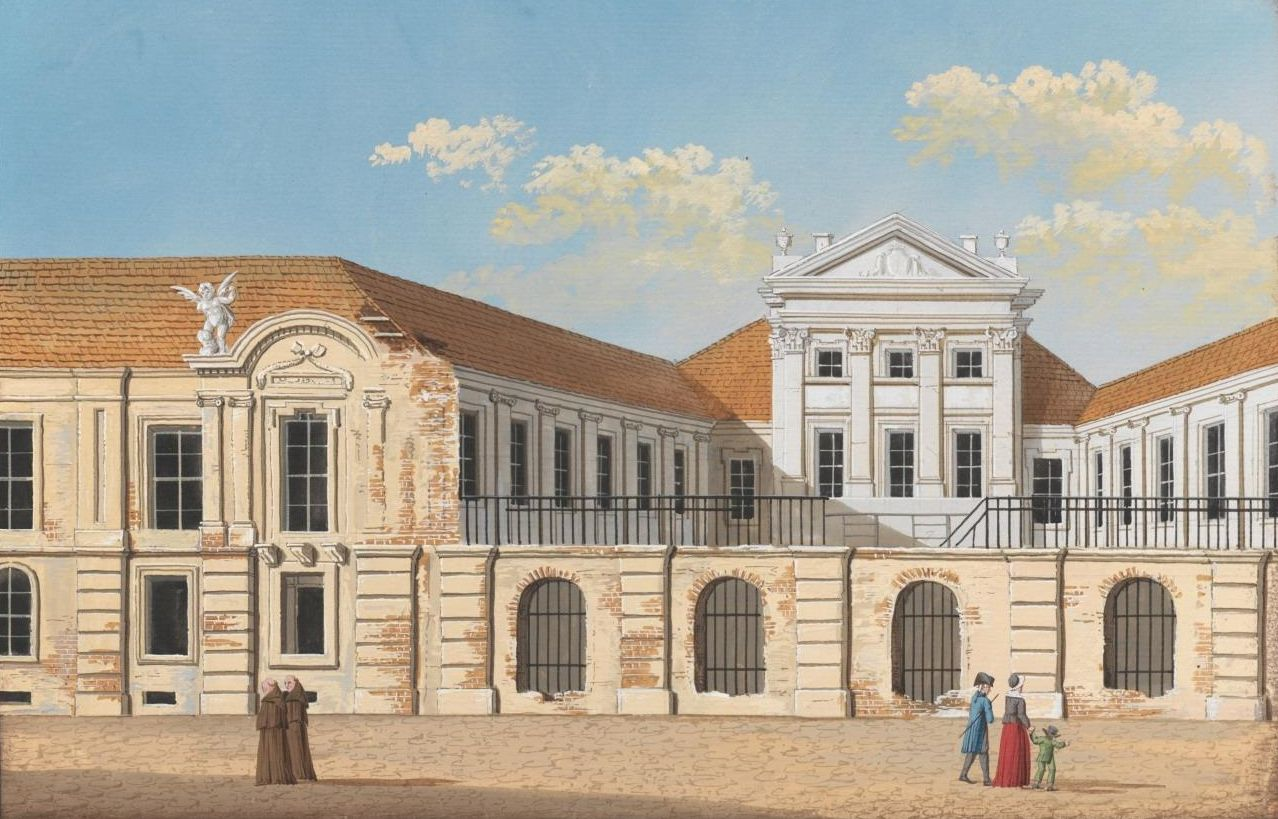
Młodziejowski Palace

== Bibliography ==
- Stanisław Łoza: Architekci i budowniczowie w Polsce [The architects and builders of Poland], Warsaw: PWT, 1954.
