= Branicki Palace =

Branicki Palace may refer to:

- Branicki Palace, Białystok
- Branicki Palace, Warsaw
