= Jan Kanty Fontana =

Polish architect, surveyor, and burgrave

Jan Kanty Fontana (1731 - 1800) was an architect, surveyor, and burgrave of the Royal Castle, Warsaw. He was the son of Józef Fontana and the younger brother of Jakub Fontana. He was ennobled by King Stanisław August Poniatowski on 9 September 1769 and granted his own coat of arms, Fontana.
