= Tepper Palace =

Coordinates: 52.2458°N 21.0116°E

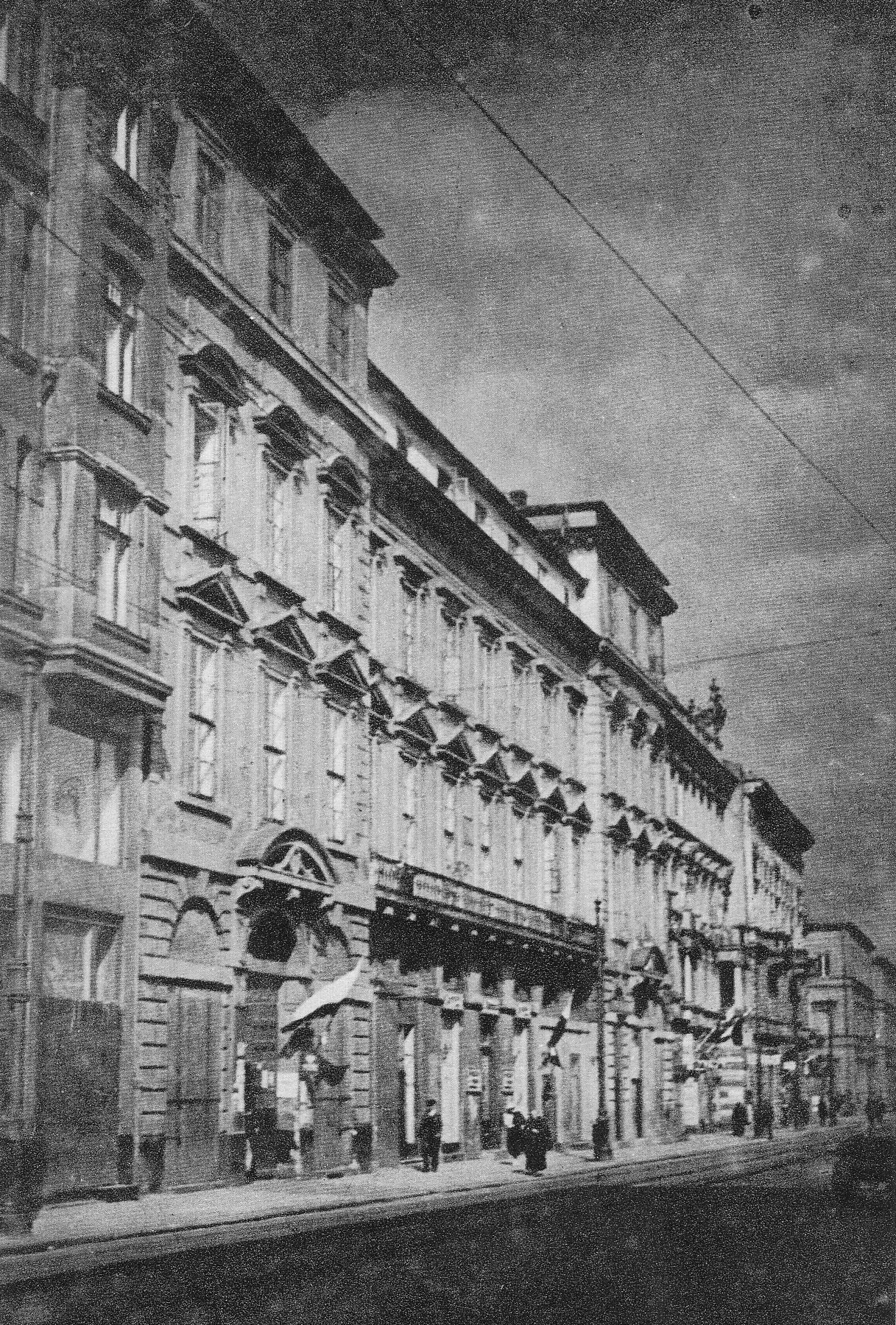
Tepper Palace in 1939

Tepper's Palace was a palace on Miodowa Street in the Polish capital of Warsaw.

It was designed by Ephraim Schröger in 1774 for the banker Piotr Tepper, replacing the former Firlejów manor on the site. Soon afterwards it was shown in the Bernardo Bellotto painting Miodowa Street. After Poland was dissolved in 1793, it passed to Tepper's adoptive nephew Piotr Fergusson Tepper before passing through several other hands. In 1807 it hosted a ball organised by Charles Talleyrand in honour of Napoleon I. Between 1815 and 1818 its first and second floors housed the Government Commission of the Revenue and Treasury. Narcyza Żmichowska lived in the building between 1856 and 1862.

It burned down during the siege of Warsaw in September 1939 and in 1948 its ruins were demolished to build the Warsaw W-Z Route. Its demolition unearthed a large number of bottles of wine and other spirits stored in its cellar for safekeeping just before the war by Simon and Stecki.

== Sources ==
- (in Polish) Encyklopedia Warszawy. Warszawa: Wydawnictwo Naukowe PWN, 1994, s. 608. ISBN 83-01-08836-2.
