= Józef Fontana =

Polish architect

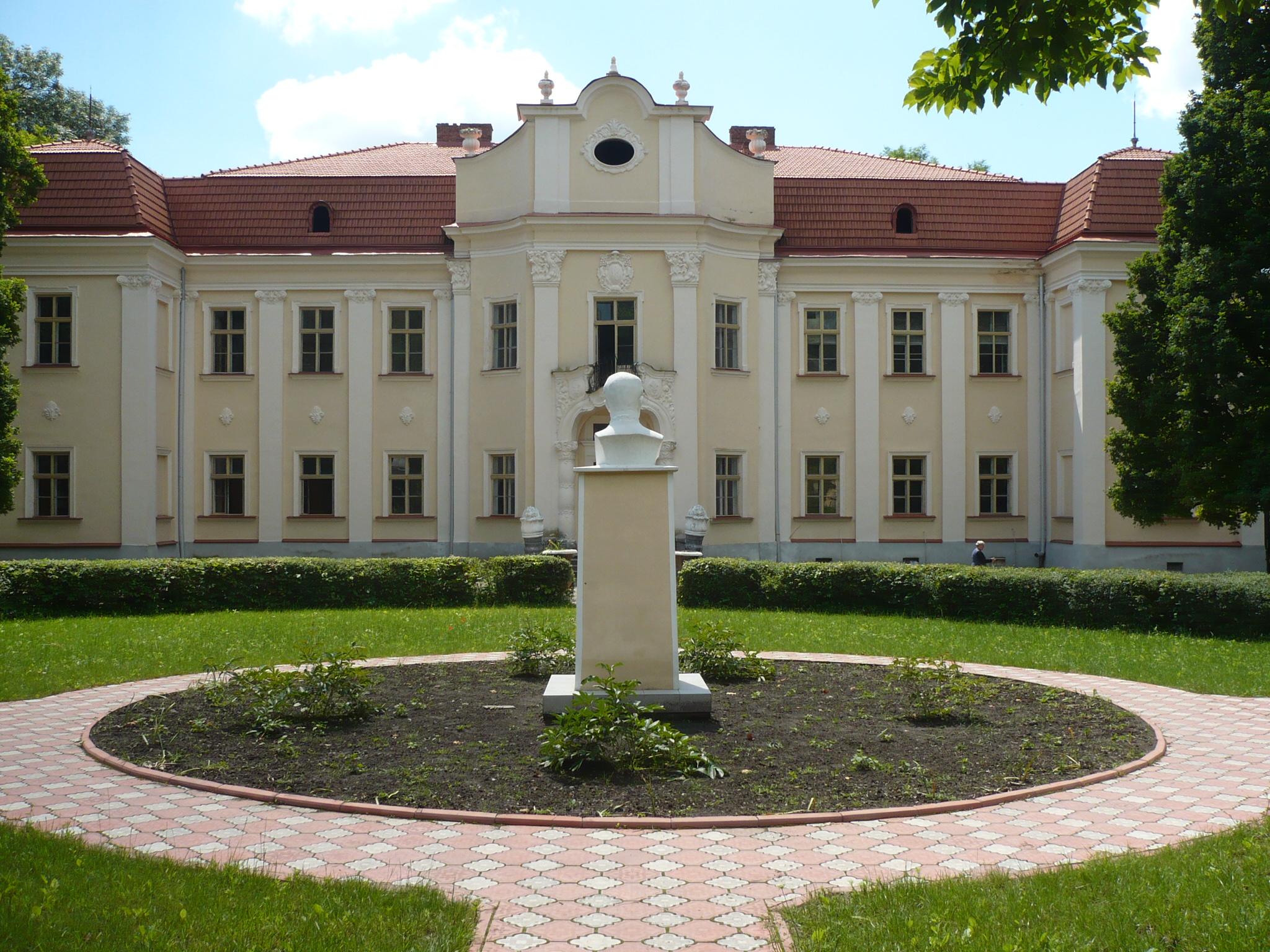
Palace in Obroshyne

Józef Fontana II (born 1676 in Mendrisio, Canton of Ticino, died 1739 in Warsaw) was a Swiss Italian Polish architect and the father of architects, Jakub Fontana and Jan Kanty Fontana.

His works show a tendency towards classical baroque.

== Major projects and works ==
- Piarist church and monastery in Szczuczyn (with Józef Piola – the start of his career as construction manager)
- Church in Sidra 1705–1783 (with Józef Piola),
- Church of John of God and monastery of Merciful Brothers in Warsaw (with Antonio Solari)
- Church of St Francis in Warsaw (with son Jakub)
- Bieliński Palace in Warsaw (before 1730, demolished in 1895)
- Kozłówka Palace
- Bieliński Palace in Otwock Wielki (collaboration),
- Work on the last stage of construction of the Holy Cross Church, Warsaw
- Façade of the Field Cathedral of the Polish Army in Warsaw
- Reconstruction of the Potocki Palace on Krakowskie Przedmieście in Warsaw
- Work on Wilanów Palace
- Plans for conversion of Kazimierz Palace into a barracks (1732, together with Colonel Jauch)
- Reconstruction of Primate's Palace, Warsaw
- Palace in Obroshyne
