= Pac Palace, Warsaw =

Pac Palace
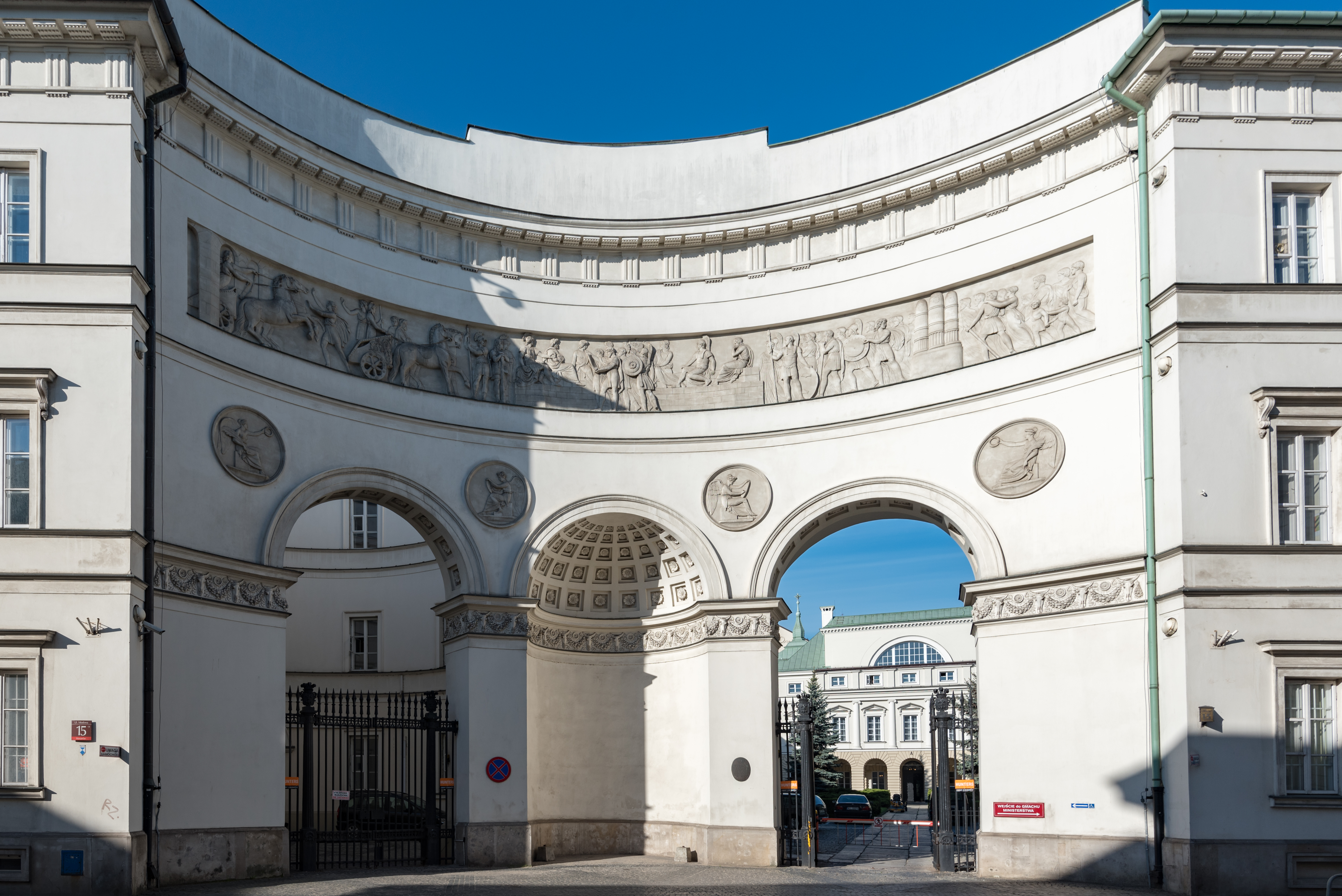
- The gatehouse and corps de logis in the background.

- Location of Pac Palace in Poland
- 52°14′49″N 21°00′31″E
- Location: Warsaw, Masovian Voivodeship; in Poland

History
- Built: 1687

Site notes
- Architect: Tylman van Gameren
- Architectural style: Classicist

Pac Palace (Polish: Pałac Paca) is a historical building, located by Miodowa Street in Warsaw, Poland.

== History ==
The palace was built between 1681 and 1687 in the Baroque architectural style, as commissioned by Dominik Mikołaj Radziwiłł under architect Tylman van Gameren. The palace was property of the Radziwiłł family until the first half of the nineteenth-century. In 1823 the building was sold to Ludwik Michał Pac who, following architect Enrico Marconi's designs, carried out a reconstruction of the palace into the Classicist architectural style. The palace was partially destroyed during World War II, with reconstruction works carried out between 1948 and 1951. Presently, the palace houses the headquarters of the Ministry of Health.

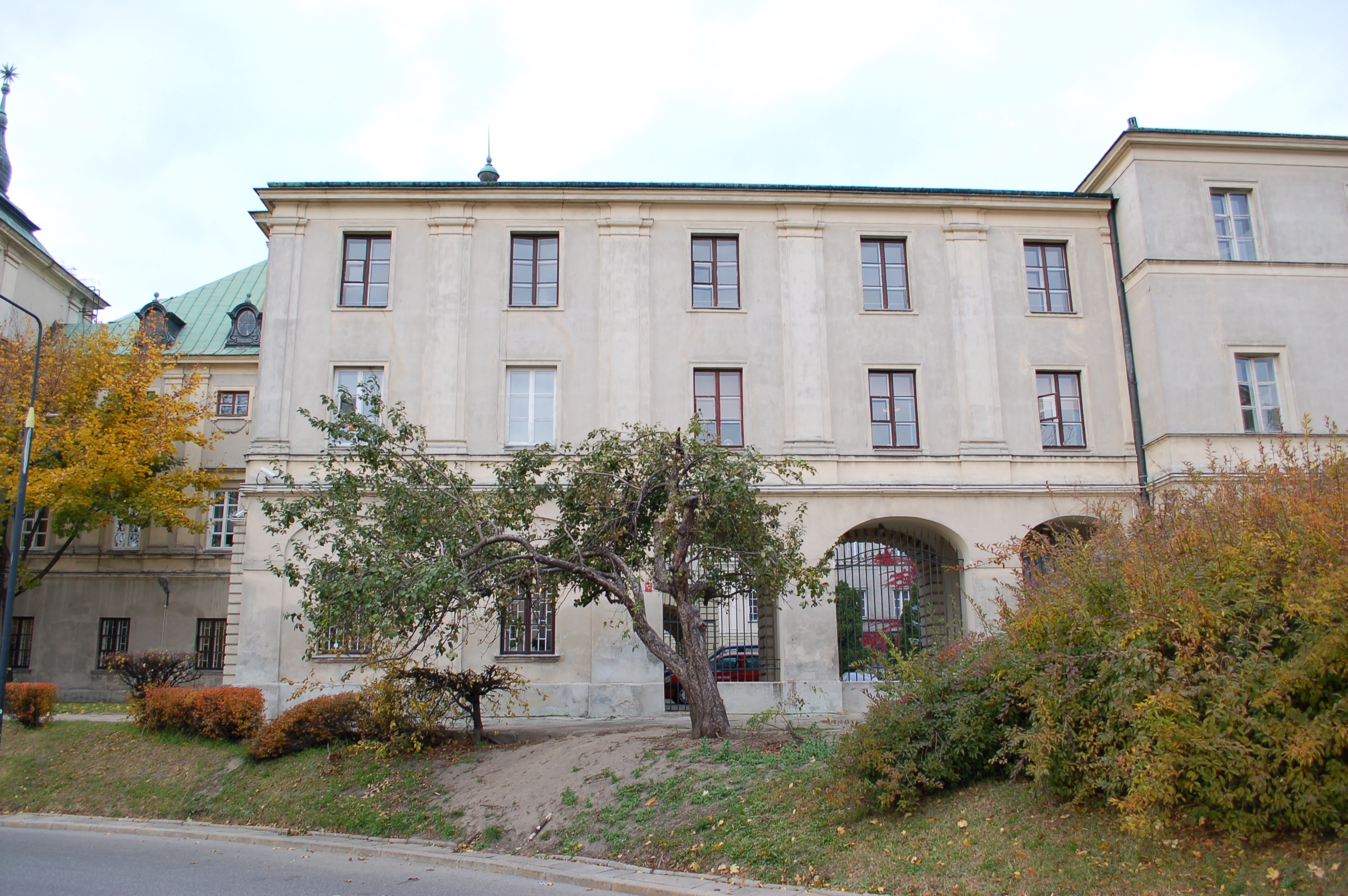
View of wing from Miodowa Street

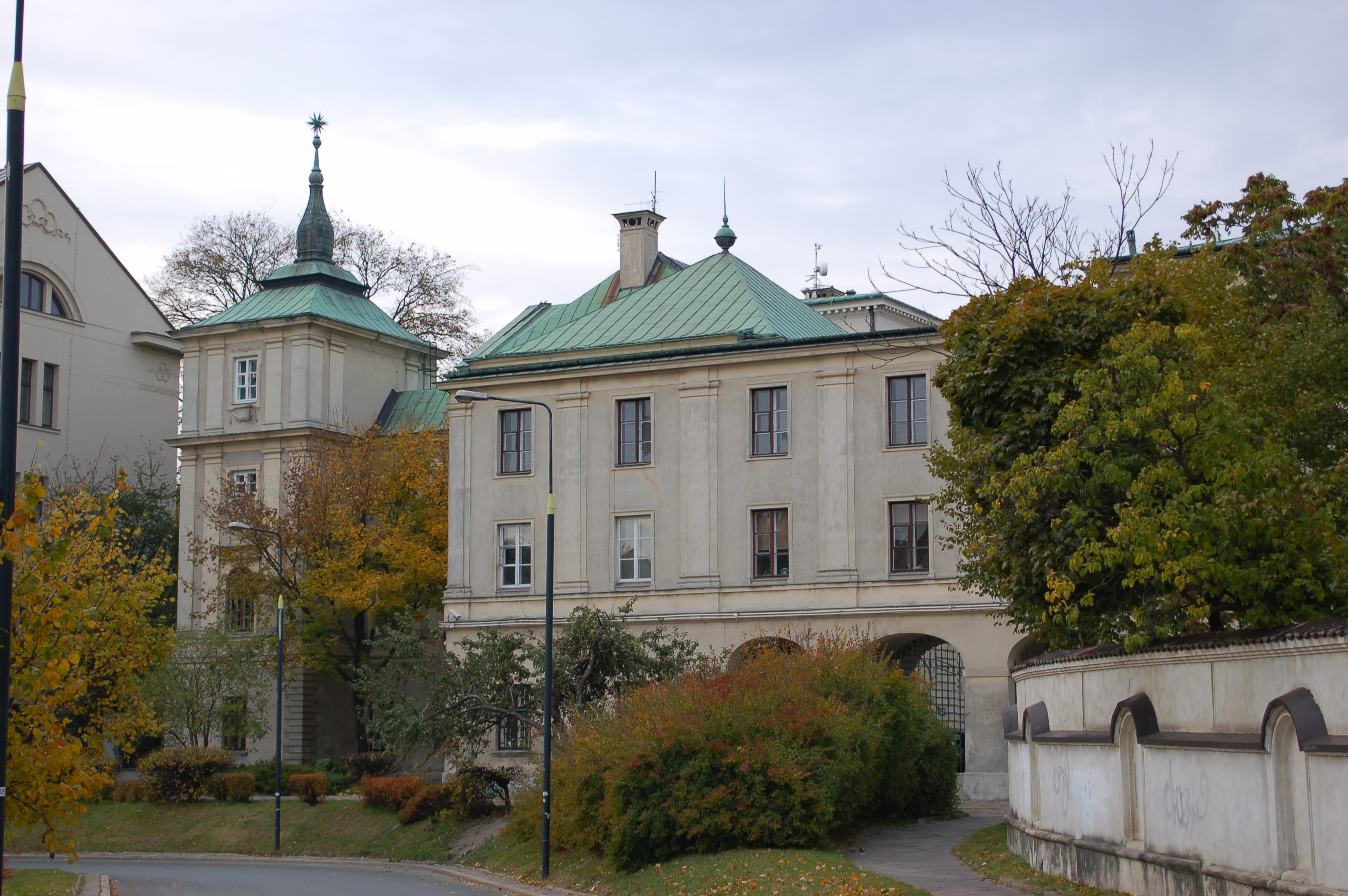
View from Miodowa Street

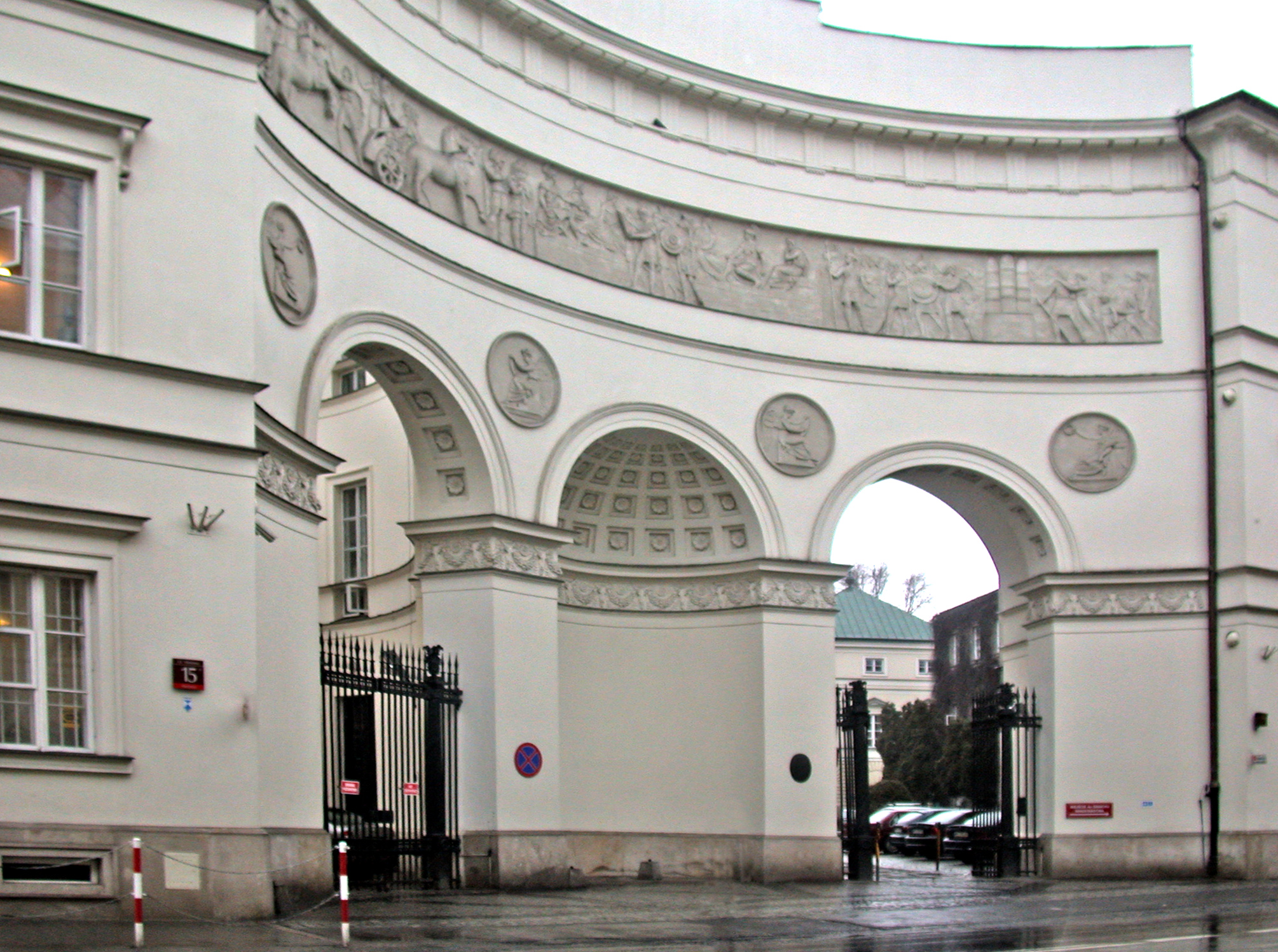
Gatehouse of Pac Palace
