= Ephraim Schröger =

German architect

Efraim Szreger
- Ephraim Schröger
- Born: February 18, 1727; Thorn, Kingdom of Prussia
- Died: March 16, 1783 (aged 56); Warsaw, Masovian Voivodeship, Polish–Lithuanian Commonwealth
- Occupation: Architect
- Buildings: Lelewel Palace

Ephraim Schröger or Efraim Szreger (1727, in Toruń – 16 August 1783, in Warsaw) was a German-born architect active in Poland.

== Notable works ==
- New façade for the Carmelite Church, Warsaw
- Lelewel Palace
- Tepper Palace, Warsaw
