= Branicki Palace, Warsaw =

Coordinates: 52°14′49″N 21°0′41″E

Branicki Palace Pałac Branickich w Warszawie (in Polish)
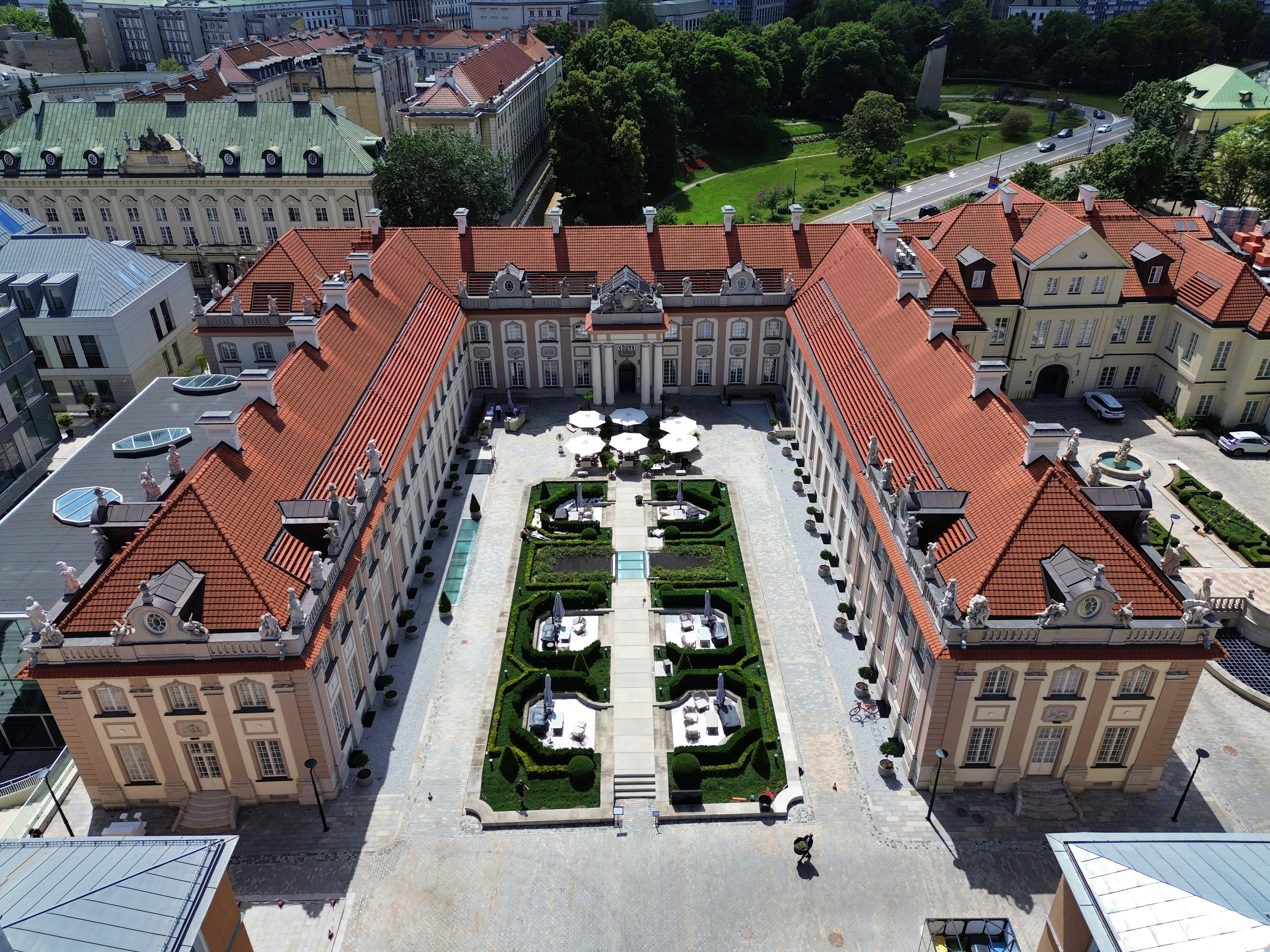

General information
- Architectural style: Rococo
- Location: Warsaw, Poland
- Construction started: 1740
- Completed: 1753
- Demolished: 1940s
- Client: Jan Klemens Branicki

Design and construction
- Architect: Jan Zygmunt Deybel

Historic Monument of Poland
- Designated: 1994-09-08
- Part of: Warsaw – historic city center with the Royal Route and Wilanów
- Reference no.: M.P. 1994 nr 50 poz. 423

The Branicki Palace (Polish: Pałac Branickich [Branit͡ski]) is an 18th-century magnate's mansion in Warsaw, Poland. Situated at the junction of Podwale and Miodowa Streets, it was constructed for the aristocratic Branicki-Gryf family in the Rococo style. The palace is known for its elaborate sculptures and statues above the cornice.

== History ==
The Palace is one of three with the same name in Warsaw. This particular Branicki Palace is on Miodowa Street (the others are located on Nowy Świat Street and Na Skarpie Avenue).

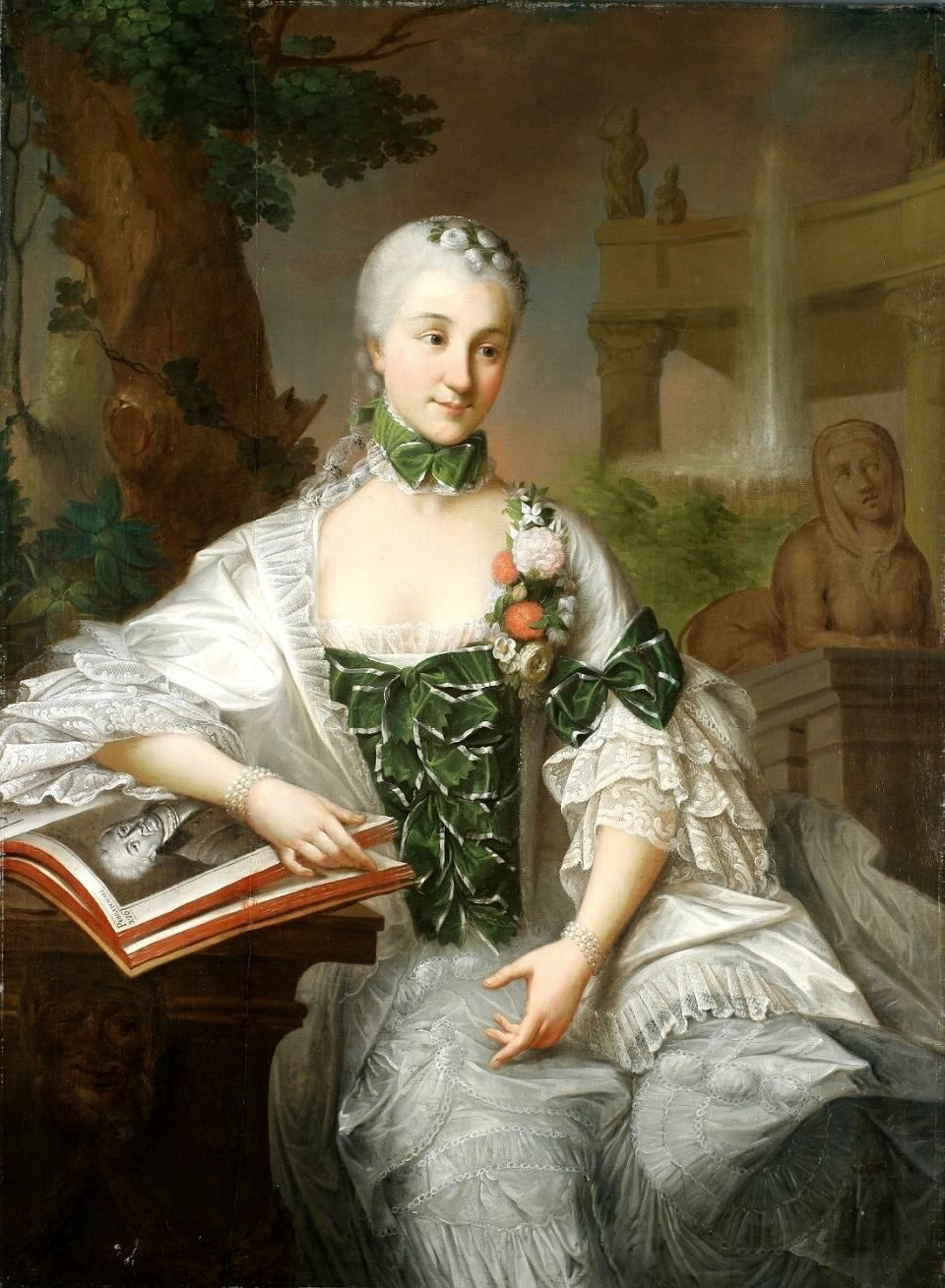
Countess Izabella Poniatowska

The original building, which stood where the palace now stands, was a 17th-century mansion of the Sapieha family and was sold in the beginning of the 18th century to Stefan Mikołaj Branicki. Starting in 1740, Johann Sigmund Deybel replaced the mansion with the current palace for Stefan’s son, Grand Crown Hetman Jan Klemens Branicki. Jan Henryk Klemm (1743), Jakub Fontana (1750) and sculptor Jan Chryzostom Redler also participated in the construction.

The rococo palace was inspired by French palaces. The layout was shaped like a horseshoe, with a central part corps de logis and two side wings. The building was set back from the street by a cour d'honneur, a symmetrical courtyard set apart in this way, at which the honored visitors arrived. The façades were balanced with admirable rococo decoration and rooftop windows. The main entrance was decorated with a portico of four columns with sculptures on the top. The interiors were decorated in the rococo style by Johann Sigmund Deybel and Jakub Fontana. Later, a pavilion called "Buduar" was added to the south wing at the back.

The Branicki Palace previously had been called the Mrs Krakowska Palace, because after Branicki's death the property was inherited by his beautiful wife Izabella Poniatowska (1771), sister of king Stanisław August Poniatowski (Izabella was a daughter of Stanisław Poniatowski, Castellan of Kraków). She held a salon in the palace, and became known as a patron and gatherer of artists, intellectuals, and statesmen in the era of Enlightenment in Poland.

Shortly afterwards the Branicki Palace was sold in 1804 to the general Józef Niemojewski. The new owner improved the palace - two side outbuildings were added to the palace complex in 1804-1808 by architect Fryderyk Albert Lessel. From 1817 the palace was inhabited by the Stanisław Sołtyk.

During the Second World War, the estate was badly damaged (it was burned down in 1939 and demolished by the Germans during the Occupation of Poland), but after the war it was completely restored. It was rebuilt in 1967, based on paintings by Bernardo Bellotto, and now houses a hotel.

== Images ==
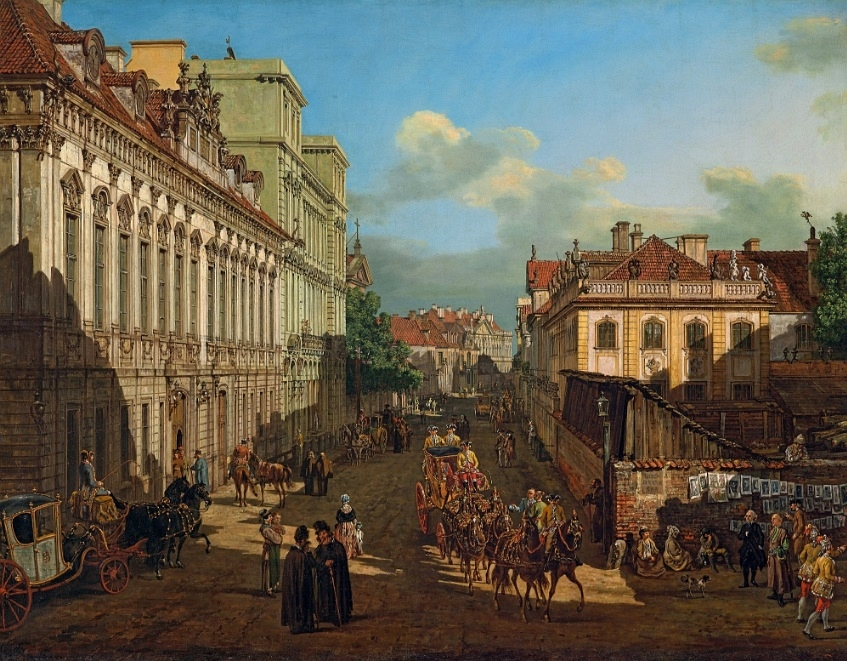
Miodowa Street by Bernardo Bellotto

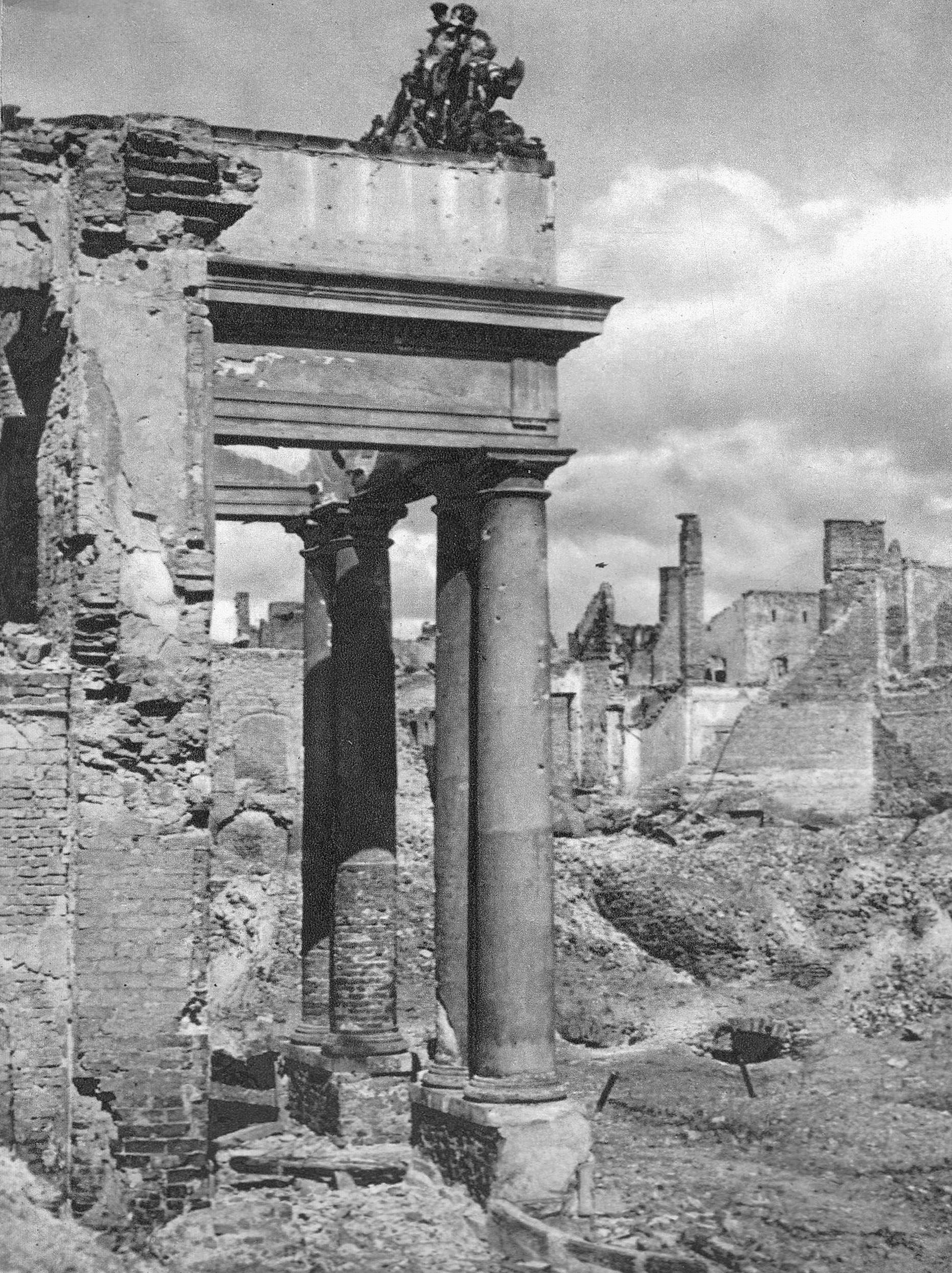
Ruins of the Branicki Palace in Warsaw, 1945

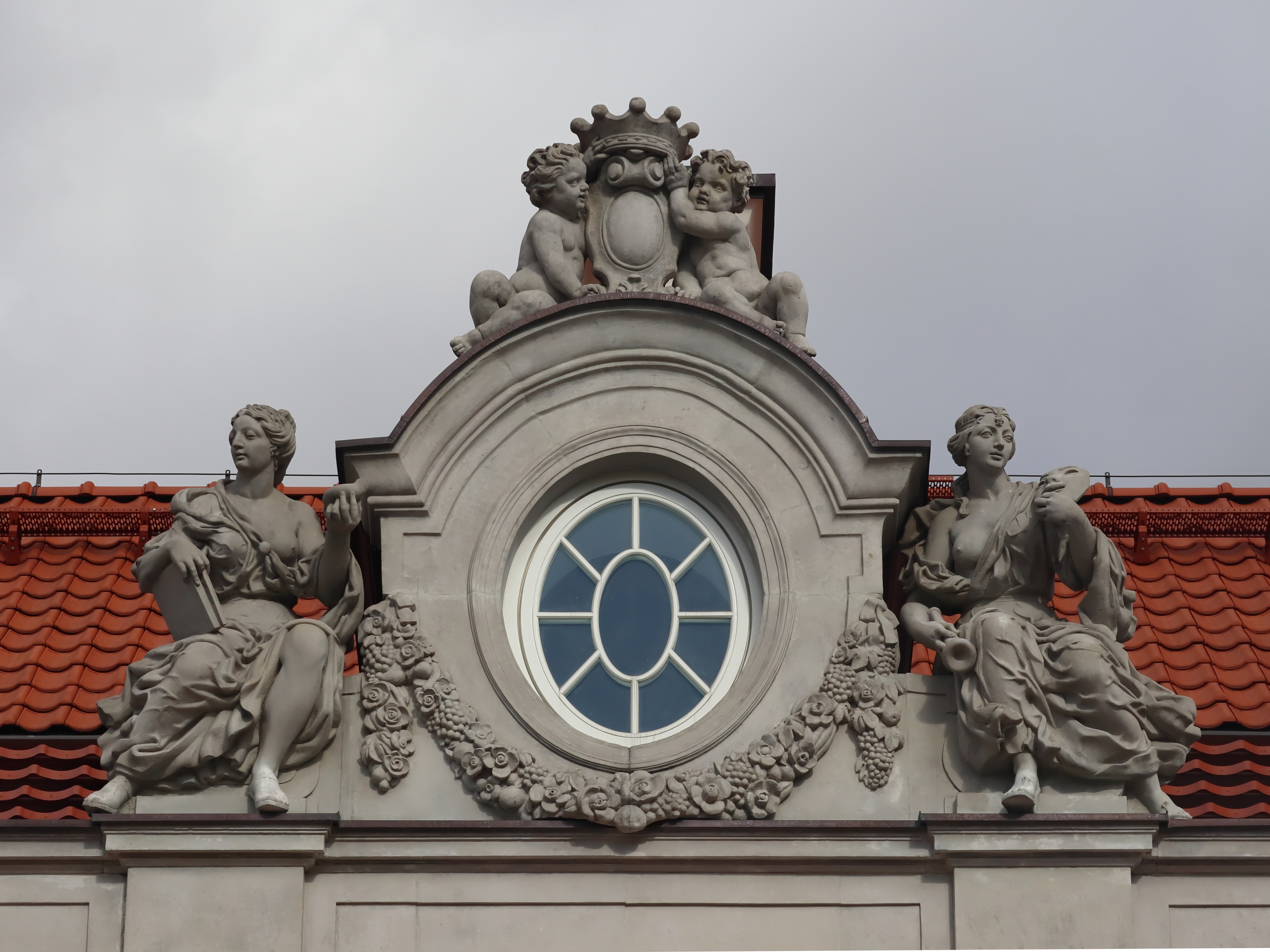
An elaborate dormer (roof) window

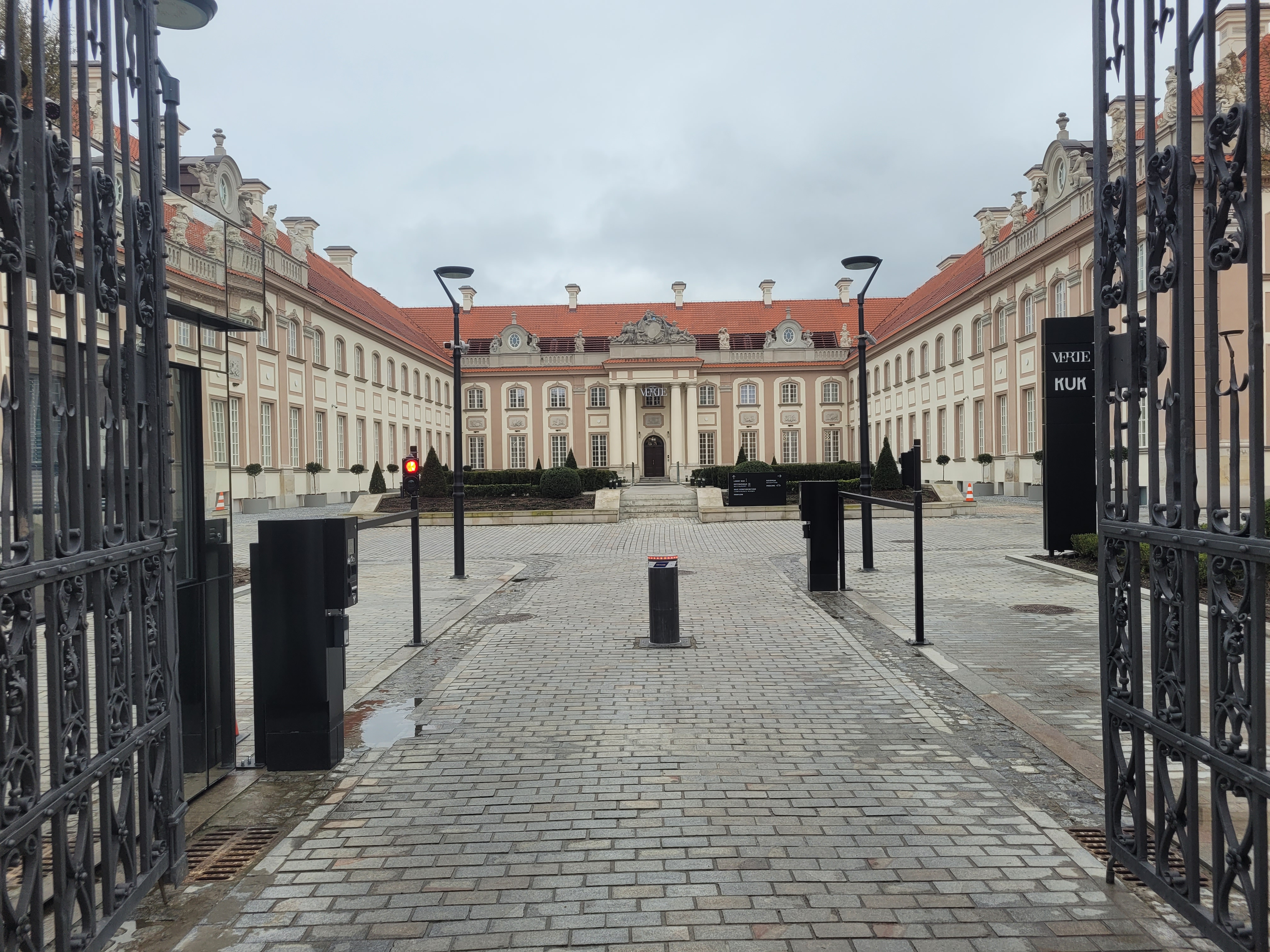
Corps de logis of the palace, with gateway

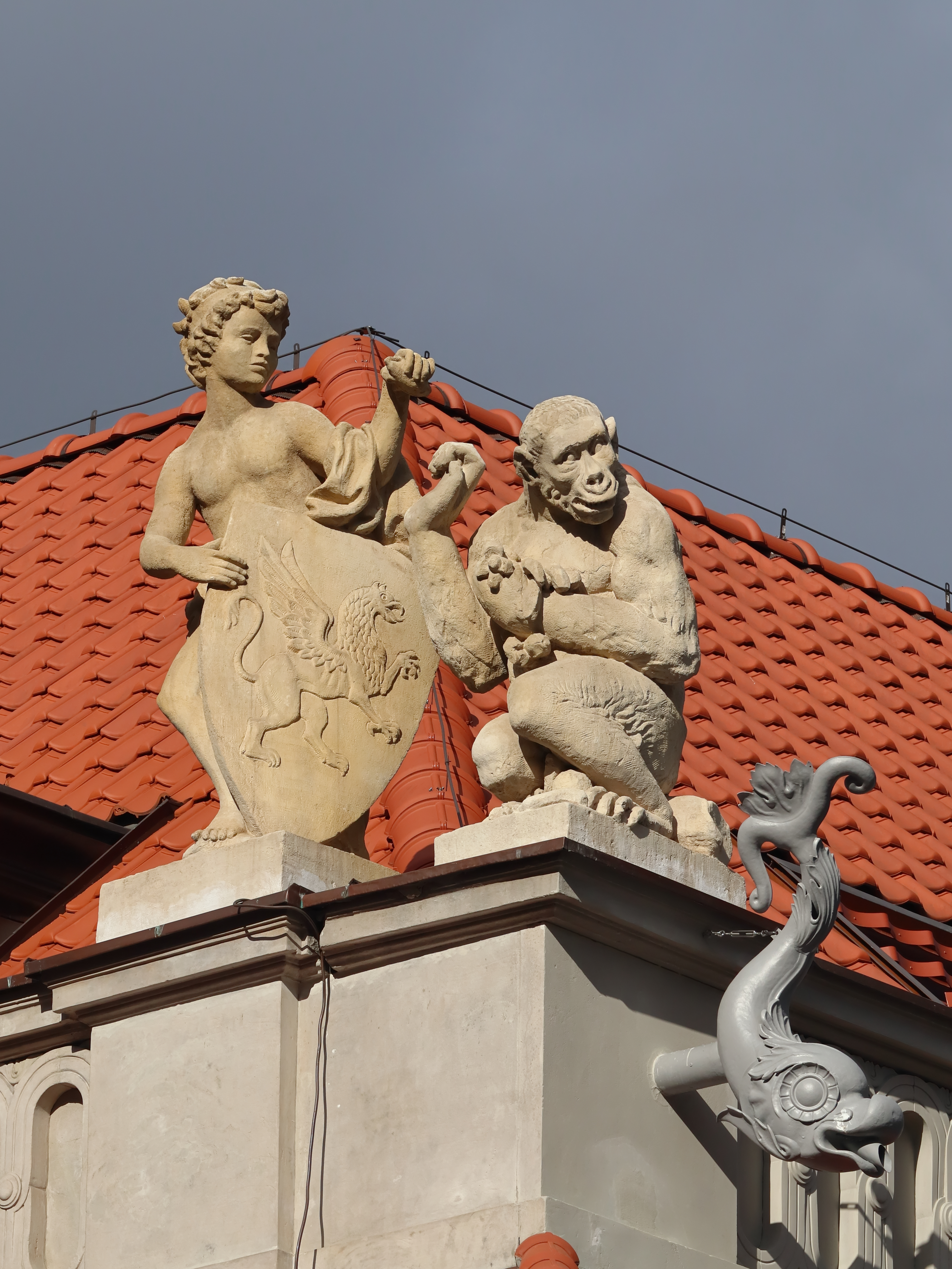
Architectural details of the palace, including a cornice sculpture of a monkey

== See also ==
- Branicki Palace, Białystok
- Palace under the Four Winds
- Brühl Palace, Warsaw
- Architecture of Warsaw
- Tourist attractions in Warsaw
