= List of Mosel vineyards =

The Mosel wine region, located almost entirely in the state of Rhineland-Palatinate, with a small part in Saarland, is one of the 13 regions (Anbaugebiete) for quality wine in Germany defined in the federal wine legislation. For each of the quality wine regions, the state where the vineyards are located keeps a formal vineyard roll (Weinbergsrolle) which lists all formally recognised vineyards of the region, with detailed surveying maps defining the geographical extent of each vineyard. Thus, the full list of Mosel vineyards in fact consist of separate lists in two German states. These lists defines which geographical designations may appear on the wine labels under the principles set down by the national wine law. The lists includes single vineyard designations (Einzellagen), which are grouped together into collective vineyards (Großlagen). Both single and collective vineyard designations are used together with village names.

The state of Rhineland-Palatinate lists the following vineyards. The vineyards are listed by district (Bereich) broadly from west to east, in the downstream direction of the river Moselle.

== District Moseltor ==
The following vineyards are defined for Moseltor.

Single vineyard designation		Collective vineyard designation		Comment
Village name	Vineyard name	Village name	Vineyard name	Comment
Perl	Hasenberg	Perl	Schloß Bübinger	
Perl	St. Quirinusberg	Perl	Schloß Bübinger	
Sehndorf	Marienberg	Perl	Schloß Bübinger	
Sehndorf	Klosterberg	Perl	Schloß Bübinger	
Nennig	Schloßberg	Perl	Schloß Bübinger	
Nennig	Römerberg	Perl	Schloß Bübinger	

== District Obermosel ==
Single vineyard designation		Collective vineyard designation		Comment
Village name	Vineyard name	Village name	Vineyard name	Comment
Igel	Dullgärten	Mesenich	Königsberg	
Igel	Pilgerberg	Mesenich	Königsberg	
Langsur	Brüderberg	Mesenich	Königsberg	
Langsur	Held	Mesenich	Königsberg	
–		Mesenich	Königsberg	A part of the Großlage Königsberg is not part of any Einzellage
Nittel	Blümchen	Nittel	Gipfel	
Nittel	Leiterchen	Nittel	Gipfel	
Nittel	Rochusfels	Nittel	Gipfel	
Nittel	Hubertusberg	Nittel	Gipfel	
Nittel	Kapellenberg	Nittel	Gipfel	
Oberbillig	Hirtengarten	Nittel	Gipfel	
Oberbillig	Römerberg	Nittel	Gipfel	
Onsdorf	Hubertusberg	Nittel	Gipfel	
Palzem	Kapellenberg	Nittel	Gipfel	
Palzem	Schloß Thorner Kupp	Nittel	Gipfel	
Palzem	Carlsfelsen	Nittel	Gipfel	
Palzem	Lay	Nittel	Gipfel	
Palzem	Rosenberg	Nittel	Gipfel	
Tawern	Schleidberg	Nittel	Gipfel	
Tawern	St. Georgshof	Nittel	Gipfel	
Wasserliesch	Albachtaler	Nittel	Gipfel	
Wasserliesch	Reining auf der Burg	Nittel	Gipfel	
Wellen	Altenberg	Nittel	Gipfel	
Wincheringen	Burg Warsberg	Nittel	Gipfel	
–		Nittel	Gipfel	A part of the Großlage Gipfel is not part of any Einzellage

== District Saar ==
Single vineyard designation		Collective vineyard designation		Comment
Village name	Vineyard name	Village name	Vineyard name	Comment
Ayl	Herrenberger	Wiltingen	Scharzberg	
Ayl	Kupp	Wiltingen	Scharzberg	
Ayl	Scheidterberg	Wiltingen	Scharzberg	
Irsch	Sonnenberg	Wiltingen	Scharzberg	
Kanzem	Hörecker	Wiltingen	Scharzberg	
Kanzem	Sonnenberg	Wiltingen	Scharzberg	
Kanzem	Altenberg	Wiltingen	Scharzberg	
Kanzem	Ritterpfad	Wiltingen	Scharzberg	
Kastel-Staadt	Maximiner Prälat	Wiltingen	Scharzberg	
Konz	Herrenberg	Wiltingen	Scharzberg	
Konz	Liebfrauenberg	Wiltingen	Scharzberg	
Konz	Pulchen	Wiltingen	Scharzberg	
Konz	Steinberger	Wiltingen	Scharzberg	
Konz	Unterberg	Wiltingen	Scharzberg	
Konz	Urbelt	Wiltingen	Scharzberg	
Konz	Altenberg	Wiltingen	Scharzberg	
Konz	Fels	Wiltingen	Scharzberg	
Konz	Kirchberg	Wiltingen	Scharzberg	
Konz	Auf der Wiltinger Kupp	Wiltingen	Scharzberg	
Konz	Euchariusberg	Wiltingen	Scharzberg	
Konz	Hofberg	Wiltingen	Scharzberg	
Konz	Karthäuser Klosterberg	Wiltingen	Scharzberg	
Konz	Agritiusberg	Wiltingen	Scharzberg	
Konz	Hütte	Wiltingen	Scharzberg	
Konz	Karlsberg	Wiltingen	Scharzberg	
Konz	Raul	Wiltingen	Scharzberg	
Konz	Rosenberg	Wiltingen	Scharzberg	
Ockfen	Bockstein	Wiltingen	Scharzberg	
Ockfen	Geisberg	Wiltingen	Scharzberg	
Pellingen	Herrgottsrock	Wiltingen	Scharzberg	
Saarburg	Antoniusbrunnen	Wiltingen	Scharzberg	
Saarburg	Bergschlößchen	Wiltingen	Scharzberg	
Saarburg	Schloßberg	Wiltingen	Scharzberg	
Saarburg	Fuchs	Wiltingen	Scharzberg	
Saarburg	Klosterberg	Wiltingen	Scharzberg	
Saarburg	Kupp	Wiltingen	Scharzberg	
Saarburg	Rausch	Wiltingen	Scharzberg	
Saarburg	Laurentiusberg	Wiltingen	Scharzberg	
Saarburg	Stirn	Wiltingen	Scharzberg	
Schoden	Geisberg	Wiltingen	Scharzberg	
Schoden	Herrenber	Wiltingen	Scharzberg	
Schoden	Saarfeilser Marienberg	Wiltingen	Scharzberg	
Serrig	Antoniusberg	Wiltingen	Scharzberg	
Serrig	Heiligenborn	Wiltingen	Scharzberg	
Serrig	Herrenberg	Wiltingen	Scharzberg	
Serrig	König-Johann-Berg	Wiltingen	Scharzberg	
Serrig	Kupp	Wiltingen	Scharzberg	
Serrig	Schloß Saarsteiner	Wiltingen	Scharzberg	
Serrig	Schloß Saarfelser Schloßberg	Wiltingen	Scharzberg	
Serrig	Vogelsang	Wiltingen	Scharzberg	
Serrig	Würtzberg	Wiltingen	Scharzberg	
Wawern	Goldberg	Wiltingen	Scharzberg	
Wawern	Herrenberger	Wiltingen	Scharzberg	
Wawern	Jesuitenberg	Wiltingen	Scharzberg	
Wawern	Ritterpfad	Wiltingen	Scharzberg	
Wiltingen	Braune Kupp	Wiltingen	Scharzberg	
Wiltingen	Braunfels	Wiltingen	Scharzberg	
Wiltingen	Gottesfuß	Wiltingen	Scharzberg	
Wiltingen	Hölle	Wiltingen	Scharzberg	
Wiltingen	Klosterberg	Wiltingen	Scharzberg	
Wiltingen	Kupp	Wiltingen	Scharzberg	
Wiltingen	Rosenberg	Wiltingen	Scharzberg	
Wiltingen	Sandberg	Wiltingen	Scharzberg	
Wiltingen	Schlangengraben	Wiltingen	Scharzberg	
Wiltingen	Schloßberg	Wiltingen	Scharzberg	
Scharzhofberg		Wiltingen	Scharzberg	Does not have to display any village name
–	–	Wiltingen	Scharzberg	Part of the Großlage Scharzberg is not part of any Einzellage

== District Ruwertal ==
The following single vineyard sites are defined for Ruwertal. There is no collective vineyard site (Großlage) in Ruwertal.

Single vineyard designation		Collective vineyard designation		Comment
Village name	Vineyard name	Village name	Vineyard name	Comment
Morscheid	Heiligenhäuschen	–	–	
Morscheid	Dominikanerberg	–	–	
Waldrach	Ehrenberg	–	–	
Waldrach	Hubertusberg	–	–	
Waldrach	Jesuitengarten	–	–	
Waldrach	Jungfernberg	–	–	
Waldrach	Krone	–	–	
Waldrach	Laurentiusberg	–	–	
Waldrach	Meisenberg	–	–	
Waldrach	Sonnenberg	–	–	
Waldrach	Heiligenhäuschen	–	–	
Waldrach	Doktorberg	–	–	
Waldrach	Kurfürstenberg	–	–	
Kasel	Herrenberg	–	–	
Kasel	Hitzlay	–	–	
Kasel	Kehrnagel	–	–	
Kasel	Nies'chen	–	–	
Kasel	Paulinsberg	–	–	
Kasel	Timpert	–	–	
Kasel	Dominikanerberg	–	–	
Korlingen	Laykaul	–	–	
Lorenzhof	Felslay	–	–	
Lorenzhof	Mäuerchen	–	–	
Mertesdorf	Johannisberg	–	–	
Mertesdorf	Herrenberg	–	–	
Maximin Grünhaus	Abtsberg	–	–	Maximin Grünhaus is the name of a wine estate rather than a village. It technically fills the role of a village name in the vineyard list, in order to allow this historical estate to display vineyard name in combination with estate name without having to mention the actual village name (Mertesdorf).
Maximin Grünhaus	Bruderberg	–	–	Maximin Grünhaus is the name of a wine estate rather than a village. It technically fills the role of a village name in the vineyard list, in order to allow this historical estate to display vineyard name in combination with estate name without having to mention the actual village name (Mertesdorf).
Maximin Grünhaus	Herrenberg	–	–	Maximin Grünhaus is the name of a wine estate rather than a village. It technically fills the role of a village name in the vineyard list, in order to allow this historical estate to display vineyard name in combination with estate name without having to mention the actual village name (Mertesdorf).
Sommerau	Schloßberg	–	–	
Trier	Sonnenberg	–	–	
Trier	Maximiner	–	–	
Eitelsbach	Marienholz	–	–	
Eitelsbach	Karthäuserhofberg	–	–	

== District Burg Cochem ==
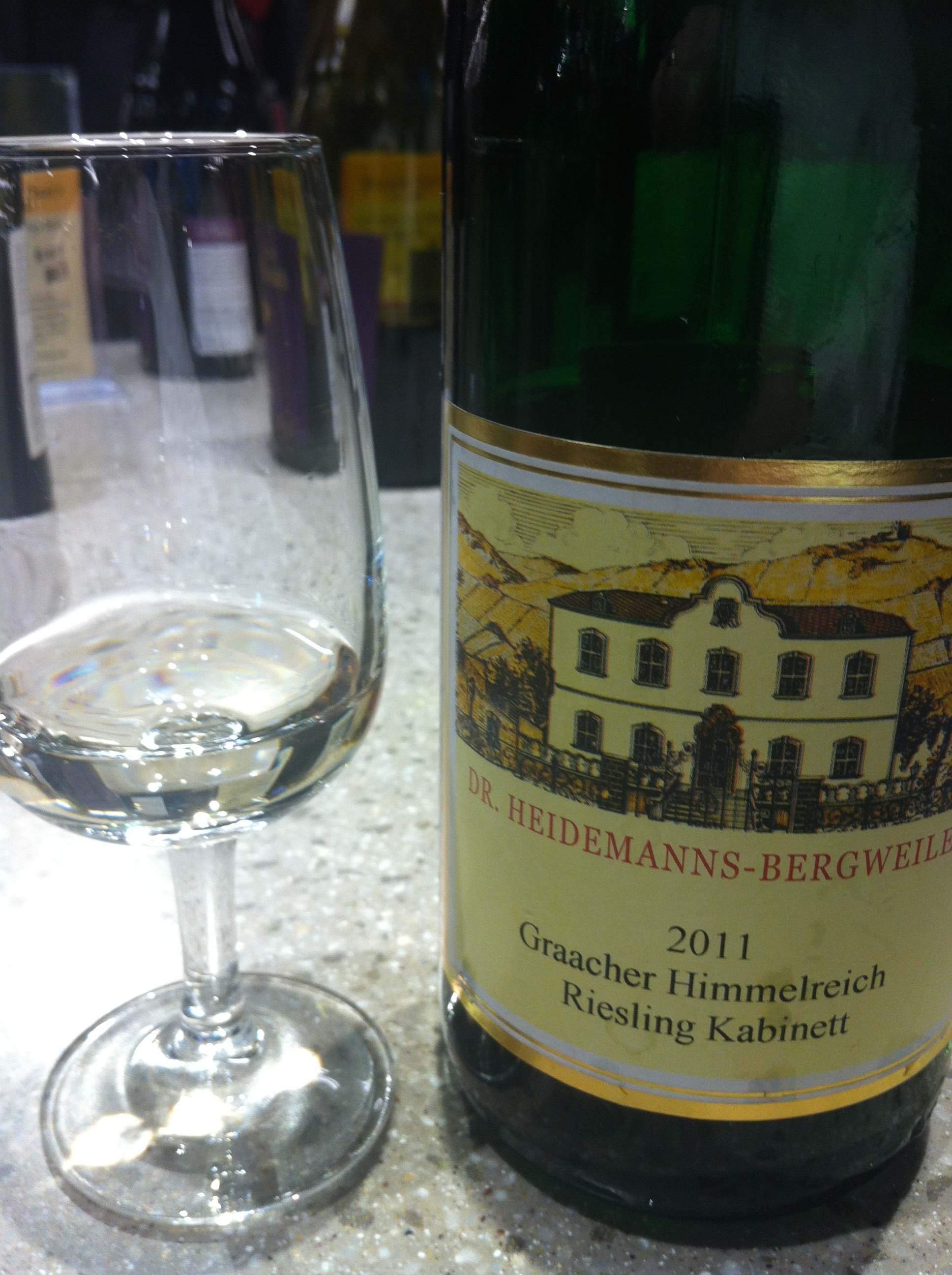
A Kabinett level German Riesling from the Himmelreich vineyard located in village of Graach

Single vineyard designation		Collective vineyard designation		Comment
Village name	Vineyard name	Village name	Vineyard name	Comment
Bruttig-Fankel	Götterlay	Cochem	Goldbäumchen	
Cochem	Bischofsstuhl	Cochem	Goldbäumchen	
Cochem	Herrenberg	Cochem	Goldbäumchen	
Cochem	Hochlay	Cochem	Goldbäumchen	
Cochem	Klostergarten	Cochem	Goldbäumchen	
Cochem	Pinnerkreuzberg	Cochem	Goldbäumchen	
Cochem	Schloßberg	Cochem	Goldbäumchen	
Cochem	Sonnenberg	Cochem	Goldbäumchen	
Briedern	Rüberberger Domherrenberg	Cochem	Goldbäumchen	
Sennheim	Rüberberger Domherrenberg	Cochem	Goldbäumchen	
Ellenz-Poltersdorf	Rüberberger Domherrenberg	Cochem	Goldbäumchen	
Ellenz-Poltersdorf	Altarberg	Cochem	Goldbäumchen	
Ellenz-Poltersdorf	Kurfürst	Cochem	Goldbäumchen	
Ernst	Feuerberg	Cochem	Goldbäumchen	
Ernst	Kirchlay	Cochem	Goldbäumchen	
Klotten	Brauneberg	Cochem	Goldbäumchen	
Klotten	Burg Coreidelsteiner	Cochem	Goldbäumchen	
Klotten	Rosenberg	Cochem	Goldbäumchen	
Pommern	Rosenberg	Cochem	Goldbäumchen	
Pommern	Goldberg	Cochem	Goldbäumchen	
Pommern	Sonnenuhr	Cochem	Goldbäumchen	
Pommern	Zeisel	Cochem	Goldbäumchen	
Moselkern	Kirchberg	Cochem	Goldbäumchen	
Moselkern	Rosenberg	Cochem	Goldbäumchen	
Moselkern	Übereltzer	Cochem	Goldbäumchen	
Müden	Funkenberg	Cochem	Goldbäumchen	
Müden	St. Castorhöhle	Cochem	Goldbäumchen	
Treis-Karden	Dechantsberg	Cochem	Goldbäumchen	
Treis-Karden	Juffermauer	Cochem	Goldbäumchen	
Treis-Karden	Münsterberg	Cochem	Goldbäumchen	
Alf	Burggraf		Grafschaft	
Alf	Herrenberg		Grafschaft	
Alf	Hölle		Grafschaft	
Alf	Kapellenberg		Grafschaft	
Alf	Katzenkopf		Grafschaft	
Alf	Kronenberg		Grafschaft	
Bremm	Calmont		Grafschaft	A part of the vineyard is located in Ediger-Eller
Bremm	Laurentiusberg		Grafschaft	
Bremm	Schlemmertröpfchen		Grafschaft	
Bremm	Frauenberg		Grafschaft	A part of the vineyard is located in Neef
Bremm	Abtei Kloster Stuben		Grafschaft	
Bullay	Brautrock		Grafschaft	
Bullay	Graf Beyßel Herrenberg		Grafschaft	
Bullay	Kroneberg		Grafschaft	
Bullay	Sonneck		Grafschaft	
Ediger-Eller	Bienenlay		Grafschaft	
Ediger-Eller	Elzhofberg		Grafschaft	
Ediger-Eller	Engelströpfchen		Grafschaft	
Ediger-Eller	Feuerberg		Grafschaft	
Ediger-Eller	Höll		Grafschaft	
Ediger-Eller	Osterlämmchen		Grafschaft	
Ediger-Eller	Pfirsichgarten		Grafschaft	
Ediger-Eller	Schützenlay		Grafschaft	
Ediger-Eller	Kapplay		Grafschaft	
Ediger-Eller	Stubener Klostersegen		Grafschaft	
Neef	Petersberg		Grafschaft	
Neef	Rosenberg		Grafschaft	
Nehren	Römerberg		Grafschaft	A part of the vineyard is located in Senheim
Sankt Aldegund	Himmelreich		Grafschaft	
Sankt Aldegund	Klosterkammer		Grafschaft	
Sankt Aldegund	Palmberg-Terrassen		Grafschaft	
Zell	-		Grafschaft	A part of the Großlage is not part of any Einzellage
Zell	Burglay-Felsen	Zell	Schwarze Katz	
Zell	Domherrenberg	Zell	Schwarze Katz	
Zell	Geisberg	Zell	Schwarze Katz	
Zell	Kreuzlay	Zell	Schwarze Katz	
Zell	Nußberg	Zell	Schwarze Katz	
Zell	Petersborn-Kabertchen	Zell	Schwarze Katz	
Zell	Pommerell	Zell	Schwarze Katz	
Zell	Marienburger	Zell	Schwarze Katz	
Zell	Römerquelle	Zell	Schwarze Katz	
Zell	Rosenborn	Zell	Schwarze Katz	
Zell	Adler	Zell	Schwarze Katz	
Zell	Fettgarten	Zell	Schwarze Katz	
Zell	Klosterberg	Zell	Schwarze Katz	
Zell	Königslay-Terrassen	Zell	Schwarze Katz	
Zell	Stephansberg	Zell	Schwarze Katz	
Zell	Sonneck	Zell	Schwarze Katz	

== See also ==
Piesporter
