= List of Lund University partners =

The following is a list of partner universities of Lund University:

== Europe ==
- University of Vienna, Austria
- Barcelona University, Spain
- University of Tartu, Estonia
- University of Orléans, France
- University of Greifswald, Germany
- University of Heidelberg, Germany
- Kiel University of Applied Sciences, Germany
- LMU Munich, Germany
- University of Mannheim, Germany
- University of Passau, Germany
- University of Amsterdam, The Netherlands
- University of Groningen, The Netherlands
- Radboud University Nijmegen, The Netherlands
- Saint Petersburg State University, Russia
- University of Lausanne, HEC Lausanne, Switzerland
- University of Geneva, Switzerland
- University of St. Gallen, Switzerland
- Durham University Business School, United Kingdom
- University of Edinburgh, United Kingdom
- Queen's University Belfast, United Kingdom
- University of Leeds, United Kingdom
- University of Exeter, United Kingdom

== Elsewhere ==
- University of Adelaide, Australia
- Griffith University, Australia
- RMIT University, Australia
- University of Melbourne, Australia
- Bond University, Australia
- University of Newcastle, Australia
- University of New South Wales, Australia
- University of Queensland, Australia
- University of Canterbury, New Zealand
- University of São Paulo, Brazil
- Université Laval, Canada
- McGill University, Canada
- (Canada) Queen's University
- (Canada) University of British Columbia
- (Canada) University of Ottawa
- University of Chile, Chile
- Peking University, China
- Zhejiang University, China
- University of Hong Kong, Hong Kong
- University of Tokyo, Japan
- Nagoya University, Japan
- University of Cape Town, South Africa
- (United States) North Carolina State University
- (United States) Michigan State University
- (United States) University of California, Berkeley
- University of California, Los Angeles, United States
- (United States) University of California, Santa Barbara
- (United States) University of California, Santa Cruz
- (United States) University of California, San Diego
- (United States) University of North Carolina at Chapel Hill
- (United States) University of Texas at Austin
- (United States) University of Virginia
- (United States) Oklahoma State University
- (United States) Purdue University
- (United States) Babson College
- (United States) Suffolk University
- National University of Singapore
- (Singapore) Nanyang Technological University
- Singapore Management University
- University of Jordan
