= Nittel =

- Municipality
- Coat of arms

- Location of Nittel within Trier-Saarburg district
- Interactive map of Nittel
- Location within Germany Location within Rhineland-Palatinate
- Coordinates: 49°39′10″N 6°26′43″E
- Country: Germany
- State: Rhineland-Palatinate
- District: Trier-Saarburg
- Municipal assoc.: Konz

Government
  - Mayor (2019–24): Peter Leo Hein (CDU)

Area
  - Total: 16.98 km^{2} (6.56 sq mi)
- Elevation: 180 m (590 ft)

Population (2025-12-31)
  - Total: 2,502
  - Density: 147.3/km^{2} (381.6/sq mi)
- Time zone: UTC+01:00 (CET)
  - Summer (DST): UTC+02:00 (CEST)
- Postal codes: 54453
- Dialling codes: 06583, 06584
- Vehicle registration: TR
- Website: www.nittel-mosel.de

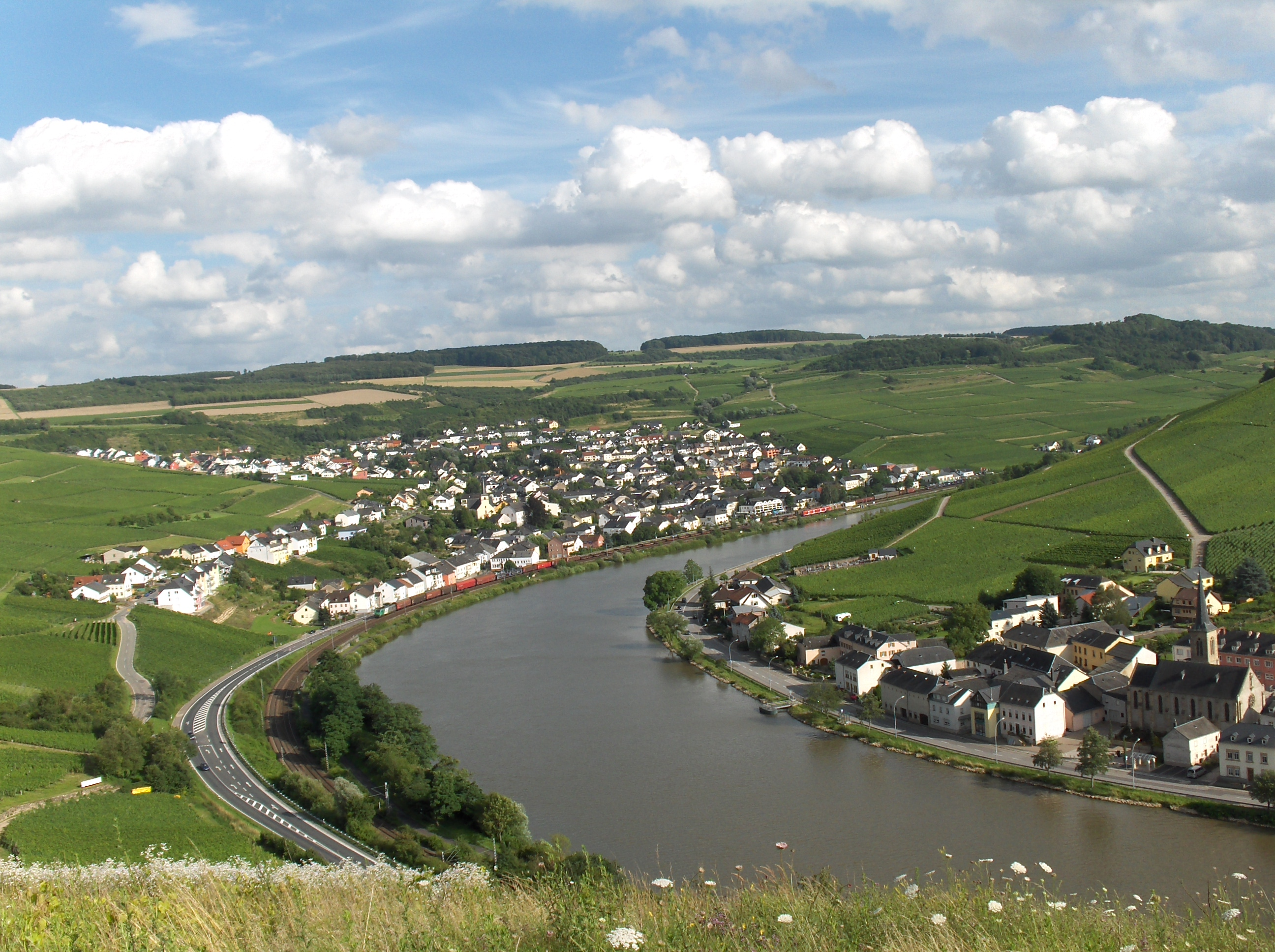
Nittel on the Moselle River

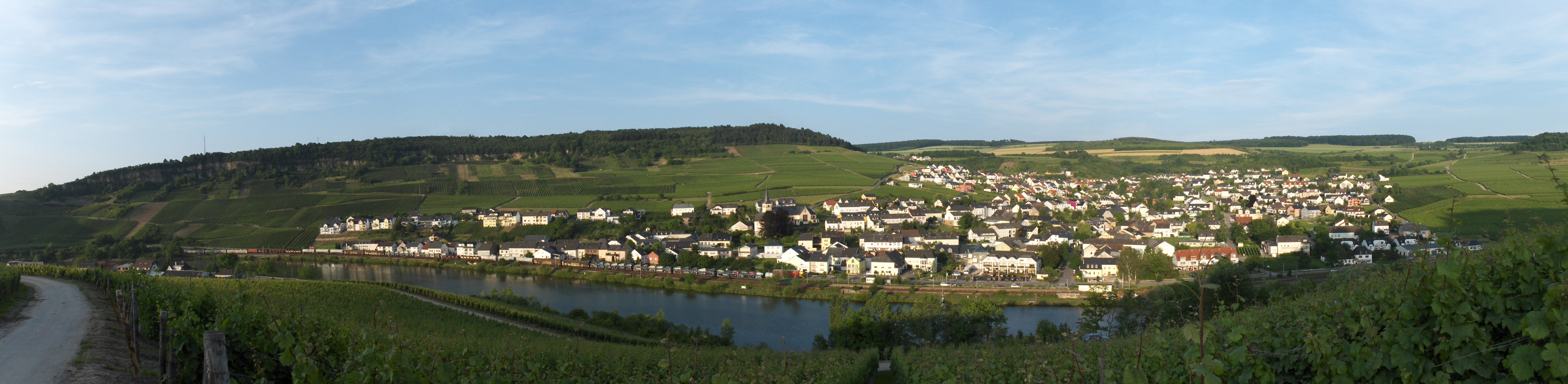
Panoramic view of Nittel (photographed from Luxembourg)

Nittel (German pronunciation: [ˈnɪtl̩]; Luxembourgish: Nëttel [ˈnətəl]), on the Upper Moselle, is an Ortsgemeinde ("village municipality") in the Landkreis [county] of Trier-Saarburg in the state of Rhineland-Palatinate. It belongs to the Verbandsgemeinde [United Municipalities] of Konz. The place, located between dolomite and limestone cliffs, is a nationally recognized resort.

== Location ==
Nittel (without subdivisions: 1924 residents, 31 Dec 2008) lies 15 miles (24 km.) south of Trier on the Upper Moselle, which also forms the eastern boundary of Luxembourg. On the opposite side of the river are the Gemeinde [Municipality] of Wormeldange and the village of Machtum. On the Luxembourg side, the borough consists of the district of Rehlingen (180 inhabitants, 31 Dec. 2008), which lies in the south on the B 419 and, lying on the plateau, the predominantly agricultural district of Köllig (153 residents, 31 Dec 2008). Between Nittel and Onsdorf lies the lookout point, Höcht (1279.53 feet or 390 metres above sea level).

== History ==
The area of the present Township of Nittel was proven to have been settled since the Stone Age. Numerous finds (pottery, belt buckles) provide the evidence of a Roman settlement from about 2,000 years ago.

Nittel was mentioned for the first time with the name of Nitele in 1000 in a document by the Archbishop of Trier, Ludolf. A copy of the original can be found in the City Archives of Trier; it was exhibited during the ceremonies in 2000 at the city community in Nittel.

The history of Nittel is several centuries long with numerous administrative changes and military conflicts. The Thirty Years War was a particularly bad time for the Upper Moselle river valley with occupations, murders, fires, pillage and famines. Nittlel itself belonged to the Duchy of Lorraine several times, to France several more times, and even Luxembourg (as a part of the Spanish and later Austrian Netherlands) a couple of times. The changes finally stopped in 1816, when the Congress of Vienna awarded Nittel to Prussia. Nittel became German at the end of World War I after the fall of Prussia.

Köllig was first mentioned in 1030 as Coeltiche. The first documented evidence of the present community of Rehlingen was in the middle of the 12th century. The people of Nittel have lived for several centuries in the farms and vineyards.

On 18 July 1946 Nittel, along with 80 other municipalities of the Counties of Trier and Saarburg, were assigned to the Saar Protectorate, which was no longer under the jurisdiction of the Allied Control Council. This arrangement did not last. 60 of those municipalities were sent to the newly formed state of Rhineland-Palatinate in 1946 and Nittel followed them on 8 June 1947.

On 17 May 1974 the two formerly independent Gemeinden [municipalities] of Köllig and Relingen were merged with the Ortsgemeinde [Township] of Nittel.

== Coat of arms ==
The coat of arms of the Gemeinde of Nittel, adopted in 1953, depicts a sword lying in the red upper half of the shield, in the silver lower half is a green mountain with a silver wavy line at its foot.

== Politics ==
=== Town council ===
The town council of Nittel consists of 20 councillors, who were chosen in the municipal elections on 9 June 2024, according to the proportional representation method, and with the honorary mayor as the chairman.

Distribution of the seats in the council after the elections:

| Year | SPD | CDU | FDP | GREENS | UBN | FWG | WGK | Total |
|---|---|---|---|---|---|---|---|---|
| 2024 | 4 | 7 | - | - | 2 | 4 | 3 | 20 Seats |
| 2019 | 4 | 7 | - | - | 3 | 4 | 2 | 20 Seats |
| 2014 | 4 | 6 | - | - | 4 | 2 | - | 16 Seats |
| 2009 | 3 | 5 | 1 | 2 | 3 | 2 | - | 16 Seats |
| 2004 | 3 | 7 | - | - | 4 | 2 | - | 16 Seats |

=== Mayor ===
Since 2019 Peter Leo Hein has been the Ortsbürgermeister ("[Township Mayor] of Nittel.

== Economy ==
=== Viniculture ===
Nittel is the center of the cultivation of the Elbling wine in the Upper Moselle River. About 25 wineries cultivate vineyards with the total of 717 acres (290 hectares), of which the Elbling has the majority’s share with 75%. The limestone soil and the almost Mediterranean climate gives the local wines a nice touch, benefitting the white and pinot gris varieties. To Nittel belong the vineyards of “Rochusfels” [St. Roch on the Rocks], “Hubertusberg” [St. Hubert’s Mountain], “Leiterchen” and “Blümchen” [Little Flowers].

=== Tourism ===
In Nittel there is a pier for the boating in the Moselle River. Hotels, restaurants and wineries with their wine bars and events are geared towards the tourists. Attractive for the visitors are a trail through the vineyards beneath the imposing wall of limestone, hiking in the 1,235 acres (500 hectares) of the municipal forest of Nittel, two nature reserves (Nitteler Fels [Nittel Rocks], where orchids bloom), the St. Rochus Chapel as well as the pond and recreation area, Eberthälchen [Little Boar Valley]

=== Village Newspaper ===
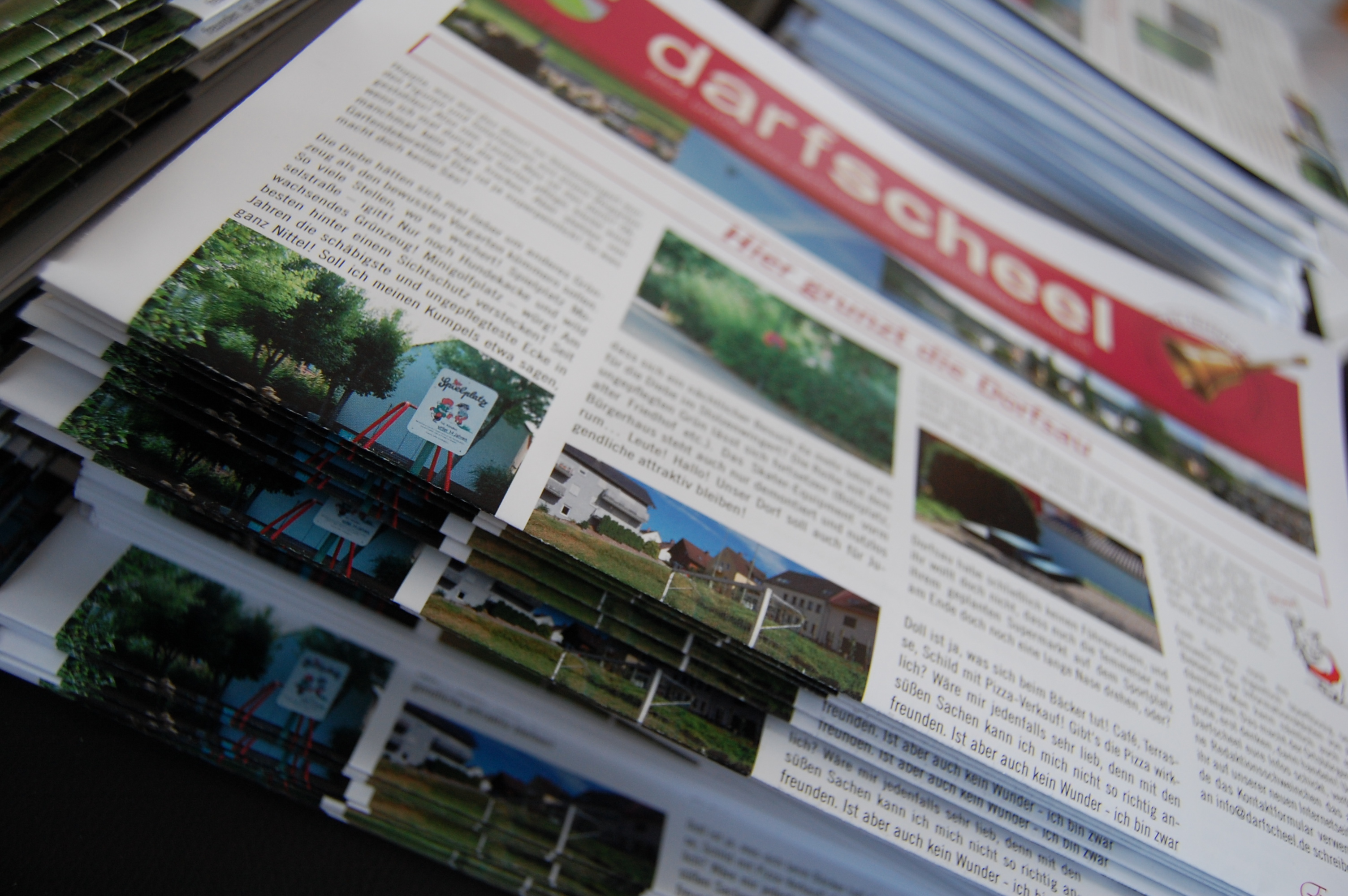
Village newspaper, “Darfscheel” in August 2012

As the only legitimate town in the Upper Moselle Valley, Nittel is the home of the town's own newspaper, the “Darfscheel”, whose title is Moselle Franconian for “Village Bell”. The “Darfscheel” is a community newspaper for Nittel, the districts of Köllig and Rehlingen as well as the Luxembourg Machtum on the opposite side of the Moselle River. It is published three or four times a year with the circulation of about 1,500 copies. The newspaper is politically and economically independent. It is distributed free to all the households in Nittel, Köllig, Rehlingen and Machtum. All the employees and the authors are volunteers. On 29 October 2010 the “Darfscheel” was incorporated as a charitable organization with the name of “Darfscheel - Dorfzeitung Nittel eV” [Darfscheel - Town Newspaper of Nittel, Inc.].

The "Darfscheel" aims to report the events in the village to maintain the traditions, to promote a sense of community in the village and the clubs and to provide a forum for the dissemination of news. It wants to encourage the debates and to mediate on the disputes and so forth. But the newspaper is not the official bulletin of the district so there is not the obligation to reprint the official communications.

== Festivals and Events ==
- Weinlehrpfadfest [Wine Trail Festival] (Easter Sunday)
- Opening Day of the Wine Cellars (first weekend of 1 May)
- St. Rochus Wine Fair and German-Luxembourg Wine Happening (“Weinhappening”) (3rd weekend of August): the twin wine festival with the Luxembourg neighbours from Machtum with a ship shuttle service across the Moselle. The first German-Luxembourg Wine Happening was celebrated in 2006 and honored by the Foreign Relations Office [Auswärtigen Amt] in Berlin. Traditionally the wine fair begins on Friday with fireworks.
- Arts and Crafts Market
- Elbling Tasting Day (November)
- Apres Ski Party on the 2nd day after Christmas

== Attractions ==
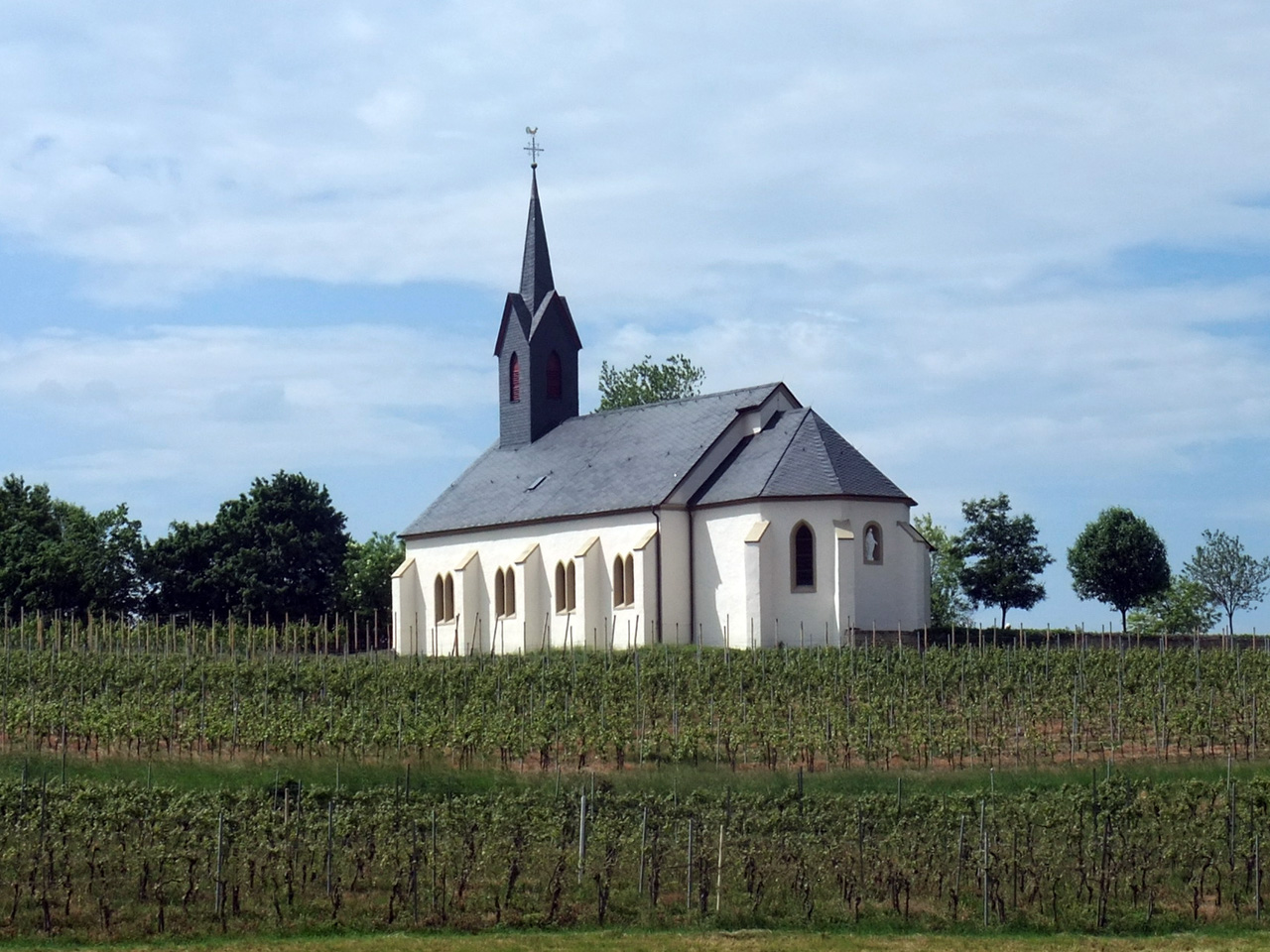
St. Roch's Chapel

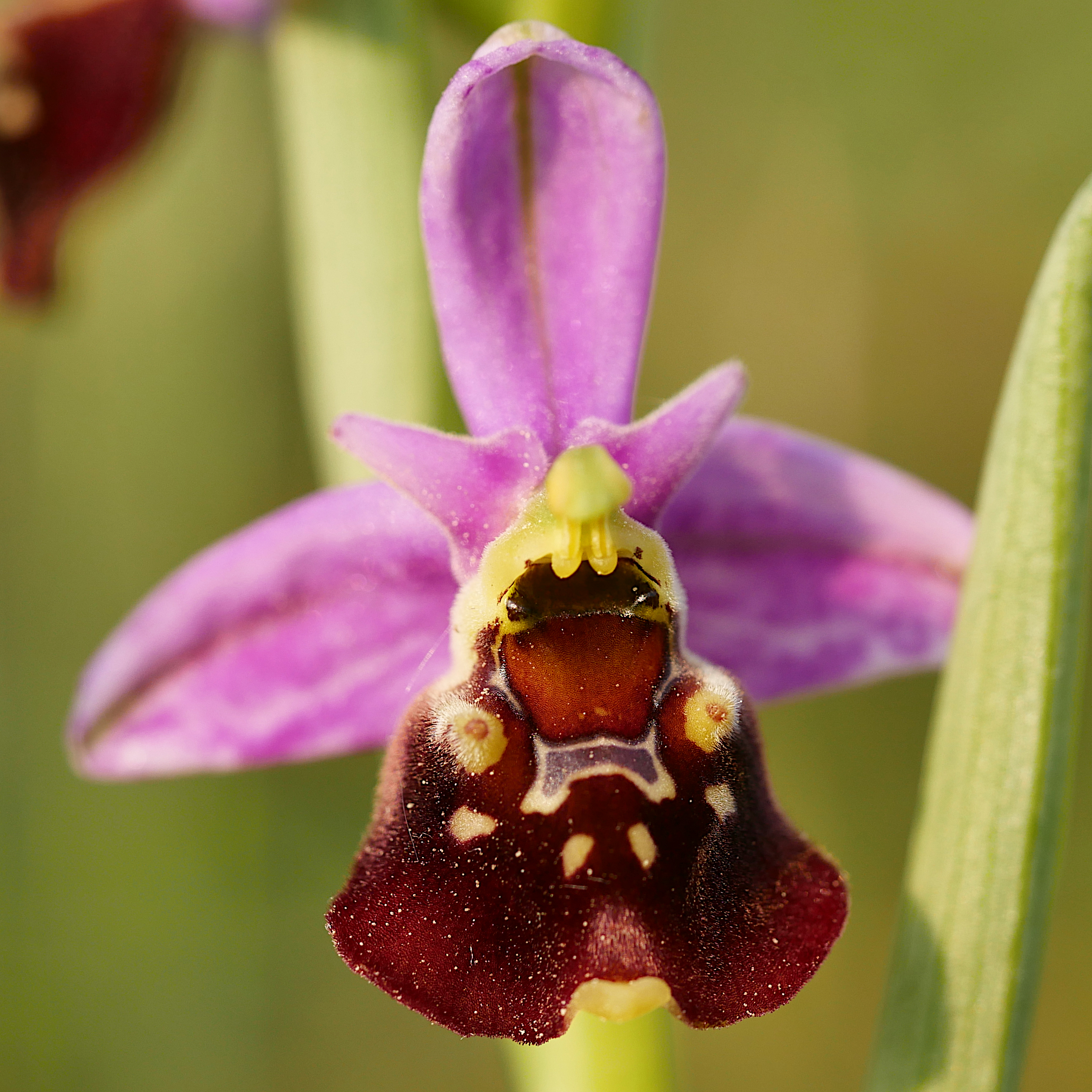
Orchids in the Langheck nature reserve

- St. Roch's Chapel (Rochuskapelle)

- Location: The St. Rochus pilgrimage chapel is also called Jungfrau Maria in den Weinbergen [The Virgin Mary of the Vineyards]. Standing in a cemetery in the middle of the Elbling vineyards above the village, the chapel offers a good view of the Moselle River as well as the Luxembourg countryside, including Wormeldange and Machtum.
- History: The Chapel was mentioned for the first time in 1432, when it was awarded by Pope Eugene IV an indulgence of 12 years. In the course of its history, it was severely damaged several times by the effects of war, storms and lightning strikes but it was always rebuilt or renovated. In the years between 1701 and 1712 the interior of the Chapel was created as an irregular space in the Gothic style with an almost square Choir. In 1865 a lightning strike caused a fire in the roof. That allowed two new lancet arches, with matching windows, to be built, giving the Chapel the look of a miniature New Gothic church.
- Reason: After the outbreak of a cholera epidemic in 1850, there were many pilgrimages to this chapel, which was often called Marien- or Bergkapelle [St. Mary’s or Mountain Chapel]. As a monument of culture, the Chapel is now on the Register of the Heritage Places of Rhineland-Palatinate.

- Sculpture Trail: Steine am Fluss [Stones at the River] – is the name of a modern sculpture trail built in 2001, a series of stone sculptures along the side of the Upper Moselle River. On the area that belongs to Nittel are the pieces, “Knie mit Gelenk’ [Knee Joint], “Zeichen’ [Character] and “Wegmarke’ [Milestone].
- Roman brick-making kiln: A dredging in 2000 unearthed a Roman brick-making kiln from the 2nd and 3rd Centuries at the mouth of the Rehlingen creek. Because the location was directly on the Moselle River, the goods could then be transported without any problems down the river to Trier.
- Branch chapel of St. Martin, built in 1770, high above the town.
- the local scenery bordering the two nature reserves, Nitteler Fels [Nittel Rocks] and Langheck bei Nittel [Long Tail of Nittel].

== Personalities ==
- Peter Joseph Hurth, C.S.C. (1857–1935); Catholic diocesan bishop as well as titular archbishop in Asia.
- Carina Dostert, the 52nd German Wine Queen in 2000 and 2001
- Dirk Bockel (Triathlon at the 2008 Summer Olympic Games in Beijing)

== Literature ==
- (in German) Georg Dehio: Handbuch der deutschen Kunstdenkmäler. Rheinland-Pfalz, Saarland [Guide of the German Art Places of the Rhineland, the Palatinate and the Saarland]. Munich, Deutscher Kunstverlag [German Art Publications]. 1984. ISBN 3-422-00382-7
- (in German) Hans-Josef Wietor: Die Geschichte des Ortes Nittel [The History of the Place of Nittel], Ortschroniken des Trierer Landes, Nr. 33 [Chronicles of the Places of the Land of Trier, No. 33]. Nittel, Ortsgemeinde Nittel, 2000
- (in German) Hans A. Thiel: Furten, Fähre und Nachen über die Mosel zwischen Nittel und Machtum [Fords, Ferries and Boats across the Moselle River between Nittel and Machtum]. Nittel, Ortsgemeinde Nittel, 2000
