= Jan Wiedemann =

German social scientist, social work manager and Professor of Social work

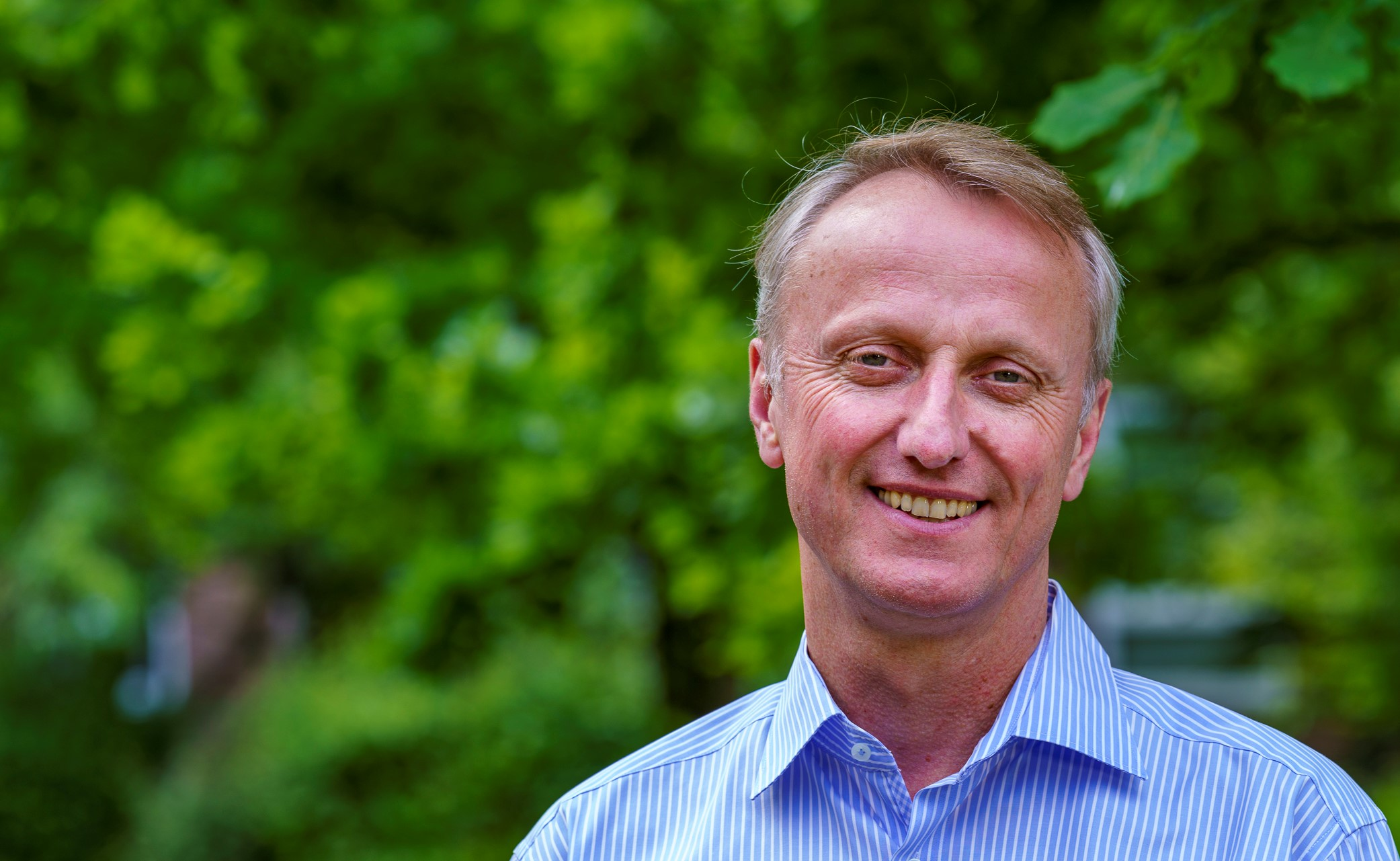
Jan Wiedemann

Jan Wiedemann (born Wulf-Schnabel; 1969) is a German social scientist and social manager. He is a board member of the Stiftung Drachensee and founder of the Institute for Inclusive Education, as a central institution of the Christian-Albrechts-Universität zu Kiel. From 2010 to 2013, he was a professor of theory and methods of social work at the Catholic University of Applied Sciences Berlin. Since May 2017, he has been a Fellow at Ashoka.

== Biography ==
Before his academic training, Jan Wiedemann worked for Lübeck's Drägerwerk, for IG Metall, and for the Hamburg educational institution Arbeit und Leben. From 1993 to 1996, he studied sociology, economics, business administration, and law at the University of Hamburg. As a scientist and business consultant, he collaborated with Joachim Lohse at Ökopol – Institute for Ecology and Policy GmbH, with whom he published joint reports and expert opinions. This was followed by parental leave and other professional stations. During his master's degree at the University of Hamburg and his subsequent doctorate between 2007 and 2010 at the Leuphana University Lüneburg, Wiedemann also worked as a project manager and as a lecturer at the University of Applied Sciences Kiel as well as a lecturer at the Christian-Albrechts-Universität zu Kiel. During this time, he researched and published together with Uta Klein in the field of critical men's studies. Immediately after completing his doctorate, Wiedemann was appointed to the professorship for theories and methods of social work. His academic engagement includes, among others, his role as a trustee of the Hans-Böckler-Foundation and membership in the jury of the Ars Legendi Prize for Excellent University Teaching of the Stifterverband für die Deutsche Wissenschaft and the German Rectors' Conference in 2012. From the professorship, Wiedemann moved to the Stiftung Drachensee. There, he initially served as a member of the management for the area of personnel and organizational development. Since January 2019, he has been a board member of the Stiftung Drachensee. From a model project of the Stiftung Drachensee, he founded the Institute for Inclusive Education, through which people with so-called intellectual disabilities who have been working in a workshop for disabled people (WfbM) are employed as qualified educational specialists at universities and universities of applied sciences on a full-time basis. There, they teach students, as well as teaching, professional, and management staff, about the realities, needs, and competencies of people with disabilities firsthand. Since May 2016, Wiedemann has been a Fellow of the global Ashoka Foundation.

== Functions ==
At the university, Wiedemann represented the denomination of theories and methods of social work and in teaching also the field of social economy and social management. Keynote topics of his academic activities included:

- Subjectifications of social work
- Production and gender relations
- Management of social organizations
- Work and education for and with people with disabilities

== Selected publications ==
- From Companion to Bridge Builder. Handbook for Community-Oriented Personnel Development. Berlin: Federal Association Lebenshilfe (Ed.) 2016.
- Subject-Oriented Management of Social Work. In: Armin Wöhrle (Ed.): In Search of Social Management Concepts and Management Concepts for and in the Social Economy. An Inventory of the State of the Discussion in Three Volumes. Augsburg: Ziel-Verlag 2012. Volume 2. pp. 13–35.
- On the Method of Subject-Oriented Management Research. In: Herbert Bassarak, Armin Schneider (Eds.): Research and Development in the Management of Social Organizations. Augsburg: Ziel-Verlag 2012. pp. 126–144.
- Reorganization and Subjectifications of Social Work. Wiesbaden: VS Verlag 2011.
- (with Uta Klein:) Subjectifications, Management, and Gender in Social Work. In: Brigitte Stolz-Willig, Jannis Christoforidis (Eds.): Hauptsache billig? Precarization of Work in Social Professions. Münster: Dampfboot 2011. pp. 104–123.
- Adaptation, Contradiction, and Resistance. On the Antagonism of Competition and Solidarity in the Workers' Welfare Organization. In: Widersprüche 116. 2010. pp. 39–52.
- (with Andrea Kawall, Jack Weber, Yvonne Rehmann:) Lifeworld-Oriented Education for Fathers on Parental Leave. Results of a Research Practice Project. In: Journal for Social Pedagogy 8. 2010. pp. 38–60.
- Constructions, Competencies, and Education of Fathers. In: standpunkt: sozial (3). 2009. pp. 71–79.
- (with Andrea Kawall, Jack Weber, Yvonne Rehmann:) Results of the Research Practice Project 'Lifeworld-Oriented Education Concept for Fathers on Parental Leave. Summary. Kiel: Self-published by the DGB.
- (with Raingard Knauer:) On Research Funding at Departments of Social Work. In: Peter Buttner (Ed.): The Study of Social Affairs. Current Developments in Higher Education and Social Professions. Berlin: German Association for Public and Private Welfare e.V. 2007. pp. 88–104.
