= Weingut von Othegraven =

Wine-growing estate in Germany

- Location: Kanzem, Germany
- Coordinates: 49°40′13″N 6°34′40″E
- Appellation: Kanzemer Altenberg
- Formerly: J. Weissebach Erben
- Founded: 16th century
- First vintage: wine press house documented for 1604
- Parent company: Günther Jauch, proprietor
- Known for: Altenberg GG
- Varietal: Riesling
- Other products: sparkling wine
- Distribution: international
- Tasting: by appointment
- Website: www.von-othegraven.de

Weingut von Othegraven

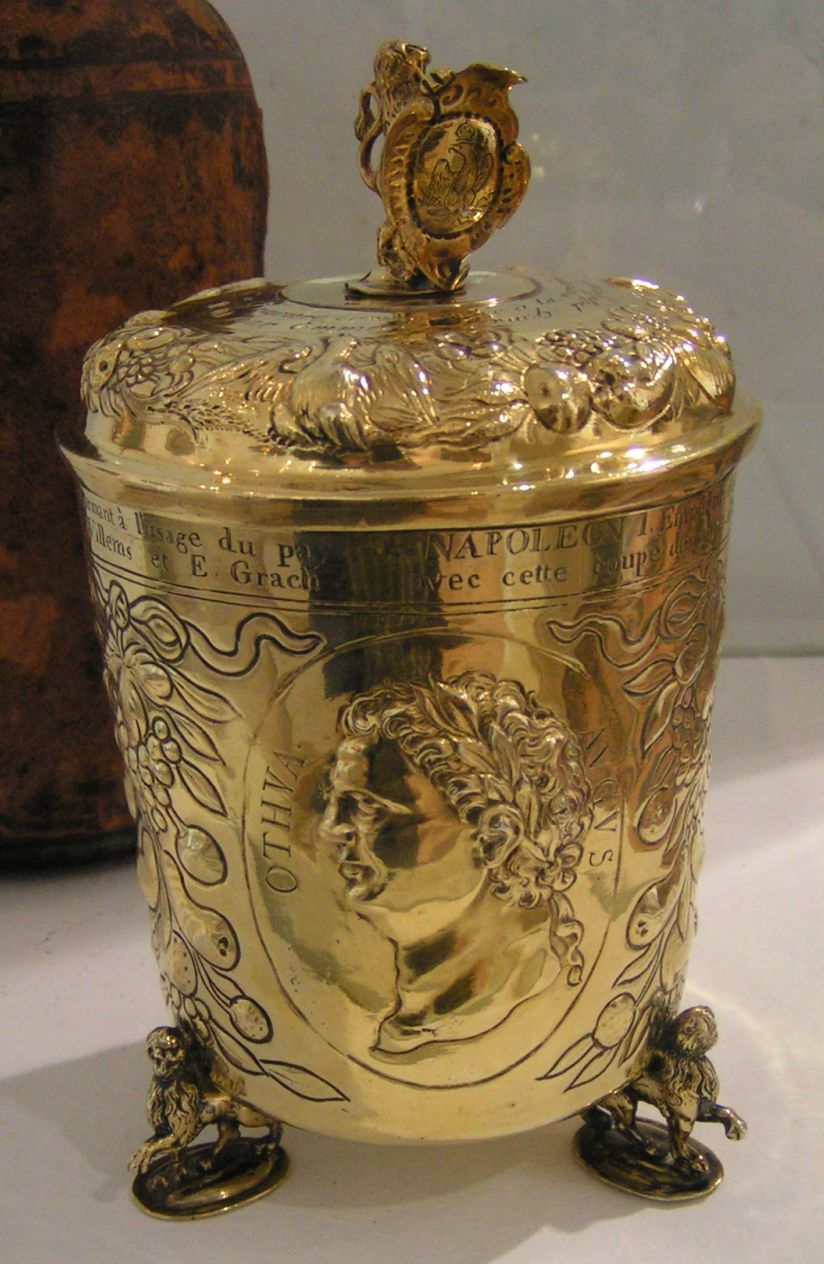
Napoleon-goblet

Weingut von Othegraven is a wine-growing estate in the Mosel wine region with a wine-growing history of the site from the 2nd–4th century and a documented tradition of more than 600 years. It is located on the lower banks of the Saar River a tributary of the Moselle River, opposite to the village of Kanzem.

== Classification ==
The grapes used in Von Othegravens' wines come exclusively from vineyards classified as Grosse Lage ("Grand Cru"). It is co-founder and member of the Grosser Ring Mosel-Saar-Ruwer in 1908 and the Association of German Prädikat Wine Estates in 1910.

== Cultural Heritage Site ==
The manor house, its English garden and the vineyard Kanzemer Altenberg constitute a listed cultural heritage site. The manor house was heavily damaged by US troops at the end of World War II, but restored and enlarged in 1954–1956.

== Owners ==
Von Othegraven is family-owned in the seventh generation. It has been purchased in 1805 by Emmerich Grach (1753–1826) from Reichsgraf (earl) Philipp von der Leyen-Hohengeroldseck. Today's owner is Emmerich Grach's descendant Günther Jauch.

== Wine ==
The acreage is approximately 12.5 hectares (31 acres). The slopes are Kanzem Altenberg, Wiltinger Kupp, Ockfener Bockstein. The grape variety is 100% Riesling. The soil consists of weathered slate, quartzite, iron and greywacke. Von Othegraven stands for: only Riesling and only from the steepest of slopes. The slope of the Kanzemer Altenberg is beyond 200 percent. It is one of the longest steep slopes worldwide.

Fine Wines International judged: 2008 Von Othegraven Kanzemer Altenberg Riesling Kabinett Erste Lage – Greatest Wine of the Year ("The most incredible expression of German Riesling we have tasted in over 30 years")

== Notable ==
Emmerich Grach (1753–1826), the first of the actual owner-family, greeted in his function as alderman Napoleon I on 6 October 1804, when Napoleon visited Trier. He offered him wine from his vineyard St. Maximin at Oberemmel in a gold-plated silver-goblet from the 17th century. The goblet later was engraved "Gravure commandée à la memoire de ce mémorable evenement par Emmeric Grach, possesseur de cette coupe". It was auctioned at Sotheby's in New York City in 2001 for $23,750USD and is on permanent loan to the museum of Trier since 2004, replacing a reproduction.

In 1818 Emmerich Grach as alderman of the city of Trier issued the birth certificate of Karl Marx.

== See also ==
- List of celebrities who own wineries and vineyards
