= Konz (Verbandsgemeinde) =

Collective municipality in Rhineland-Palatinate

- Verbandsgemeinde
- Location of Konz within Trier-Saarburg district
- Interactive map of Konz
- Location within Germany Location within Rhineland-Palatinate
- Coordinates: 49°42′N 6°35′E
- Country: Germany
- State: Rhineland-Palatinate
- District: Trier-Saarburg
- Seat: Konz
- Subdivisions: 12 municipalities

Area
  - Total: 130.41 km^{2} (50.35 sq mi)

Population (2025-12-31)
  - Total: 32,018
  - Density: 245.52/km^{2} (635.89/sq mi)
- Time zone: UTC+01:00 (CET)
  - Summer (DST): UTC+02:00 (CEST)
- Website: www.konz.eu

Konz is a Verbandsgemeinde ("collective municipality") in the district Trier-Saarburg, in Rhineland-Palatinate, Germany. The seat of the Verbandsgemeinde is in Konz.

The Verbandsgemeinde Konz consists of the following Ortsgemeinden ("local municipalities"):

1. Kanzem
2. Konz
3. Nittel
4. Oberbillig
5. Onsdorf
6. Pellingen
7. Tawern
8. Temmels
9. Wasserliesch
10. Wawern
11. Wellen
12. Wiltingen
