= HD Schrader =

Sculptor

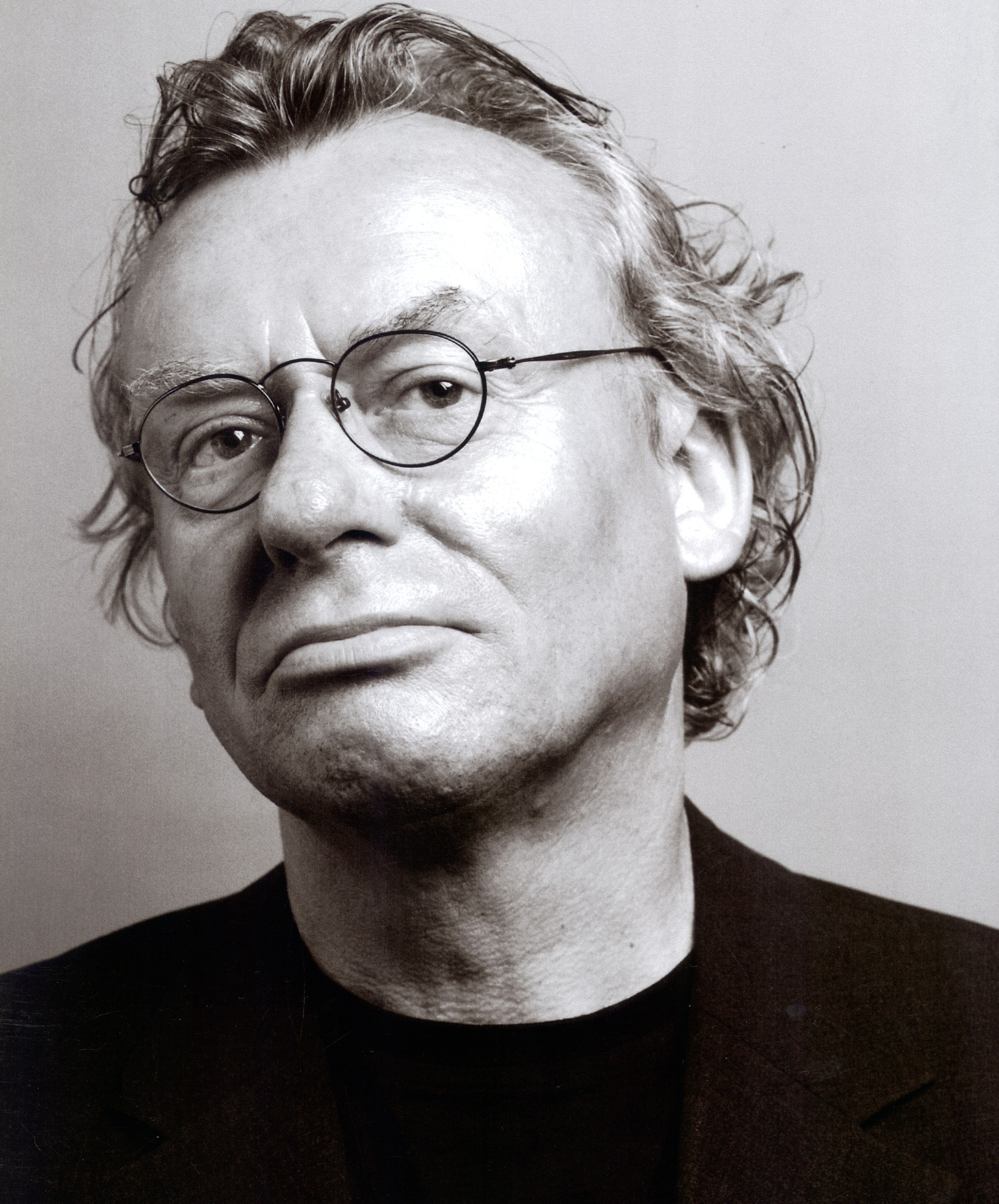
- Schrader in 2010
- Born: 1945; Bad Klosterlausnitz, Germany
- Known for: Sculpture
- Movement: Concrete Art

HD Schrader (born 1945), born Hans-Dieter Schrader, is a German sculptor. He is known in particular for his series of works titled Cubecracks, which may be attributed to Concrete Art.

== Life ==
Schrader was born in 1945 in Bad Klosterlausnitz in Thuringia, in former East Germany. He studied (among other things) constructive design (under Max Herrmann Mahlmann) at the former Werkkunstschule Hamburg (School of Applied Arts) from 1965 to 1969. Schrader had his first solo exhibition in 1969 in the Galerie des Städtebauministeriums (gallery of the ministry for urban construction) in Bonn, showing his first series of works Quadratreihungen (Sequences of squares) consisting of drawings and relief pictures made of perspex. The following year he went on to produce his Kubusreihungen (Sequences of cubes) encompassing objects, acrylic paintings, drawings and silkscreen prints. In 1972, Schrader co-founded the artists’ group International Work Group for Constructive Art (AIFKG) in Antwerp, whose members included the artists Ewerdt Hilgemann, Richard Paul Lohse, Marcello Morandini and François Morellet. Up until 1986 he participated in six symposia held by the IAFKG work group in various European countries. Schrader sparked considerably more interest in 1973 with his work Kugel im Kubus (Sphere in Cube), which he was commissioned to create by the City of Hamburg after winning an open competition for Hamburg artists; the work was installed on the forecourt of the Hamburger Kunstverein. In 1974, Schrader took part in the 10th Biennale Internationale d’Art Menton in France.

Since 1986 Schrader has held a position as a professor for typography at the Dortmund University of Applied Sciences and Arts, in the department of design. He was awarded several prizes, such as, in 1990, the award Kultur aktuell in Schleswig-Holstein (Contemporary culture in Schleswig-Holstein) for the work of the citizens’ action group that campaigned to preserve the sculpture Kubus-Balance (Cube-Balance); or, in 1991, the regional art award Landesschaupreis Schleswig-Holstein. He was commissioned by the state government in Kiel to show his installation Kubuskoog (Cube polder) in the German pavilion at the EXPO 2000 in Hanover. In 2005, Schrader was invited to participate in a Chinese-German symposium on painting, held in Wuyishan in China. The following year he was appointed a member of the international jury for the Olympic Landscape Sculpture Contest in Beijing, China.

Schrader lives and works in Hamburg and Osterhever (in northern Germany).

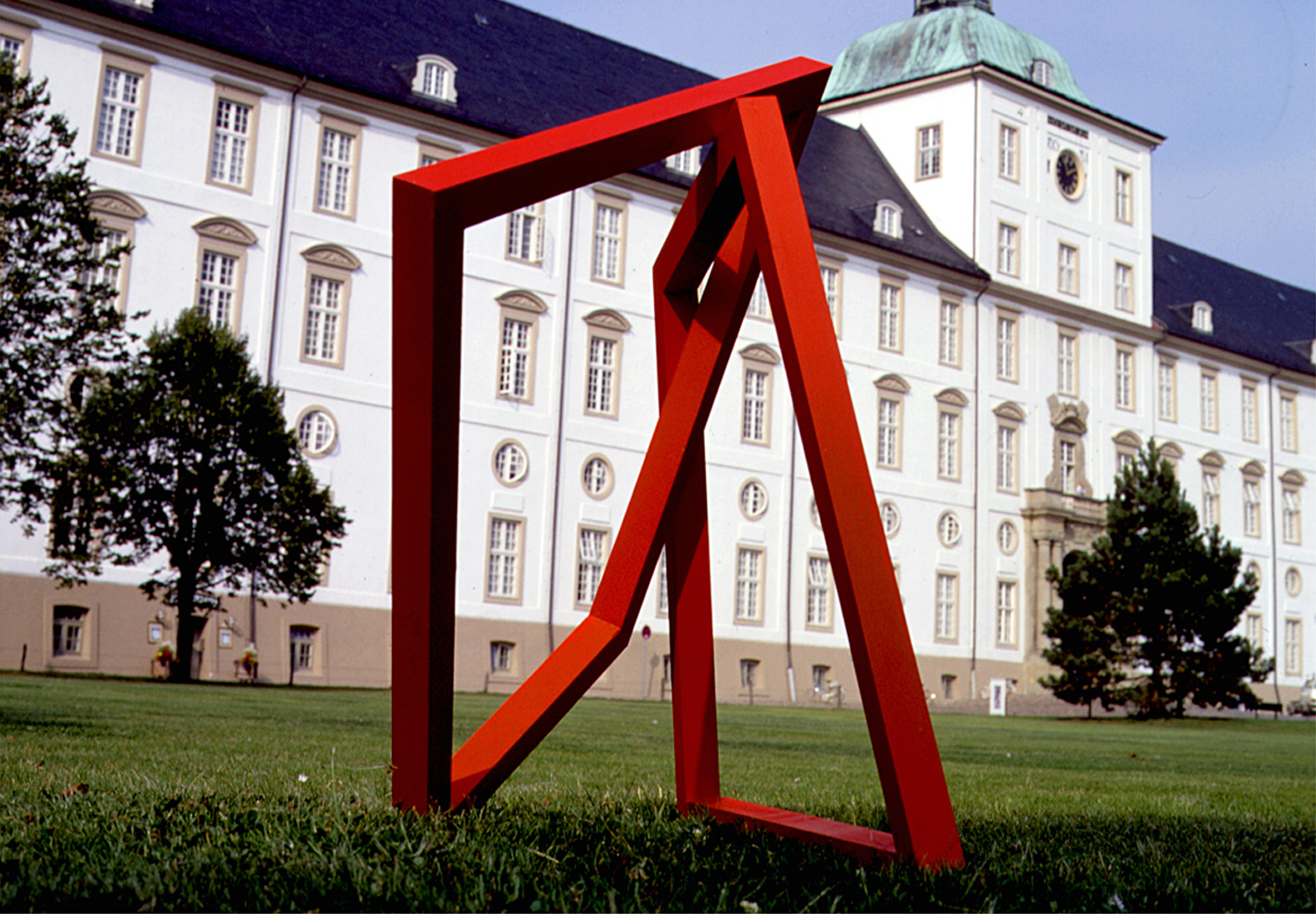
Viereck und Viereck (quadrilateral and quadrilateral) (1986). Schloss Gottorf, Schleswig (D)

=== Solo exhibitions ===
(Entries labelled “c” indicate exhibitions with an accompanying catalogue.)

- 1969 Galerie im Städtebauministerium, Bad Godesberg (D)
- 1974 Galerij Vecu, Antwerp (BE) [with Pierre de Poortere]
- 1975 Galerie Szepan, Gelsenkirchen (D) [with Pierre de Poortere]; Galerie Beckmann, Hamburg (D); Galleria Beniamino, San Remo (I) [with Pierre de Poortere]
- 1976 Galleria Dei Mille, Bergamo (I) [with Pierre de Poortere]
- 1979 Galleria de la Plaza, Varese (I) [with Pierre de Poortere]
- 1983 Standpunkte. Hamburger Kunsthalle (D)^{c}
- 1992 Museum am Ostwall, Dortmund (D); Wilhelm-Hack-Museum, Ludwigshafen (D)^{c}
- 1994 Museum Modern Art, Hünfeld (D)^{c}
- 1995/1996 Cubecracks. Städtische Galerie des Emschertalmuseums, Herne (D), Flottmann-Hallen, Herne and the large steel sculptures Cubecracks in various public places in Herne / Museum für Konkrete Kunst, Ingolstadt (D) / Museum für Kunst und Kulturgeschichte (Katharinenkirche) der Hansestadt Lübeck (D) and in the Burgkloster, Lübeck^{c}
- 1998/1999/2000 Kunstraum Kubus. Richard-Haizmann-Museum, Niebüll (D) / Stadtgalerie Brunsbüttel (D) / Stadtgalerie Kiel (D) / Städtisches Museum, Gelsenkirchen (D) / Museen im Kulturzentrum, Rendsburg (D)^{c}
- 2000 Cubes and Trees. Schloss Agathenburg (D); German pavilion, EXPO 2000, Hanover (D) (courtyard)
- 2002 Kunstverein Schloss Plön (D)
- 2003 Mönchehaus Museum Goslar (D)^{c}
- 2006 Contemporanea, Oberbillig/Trier (D)^{c} (comprehensive retrospective)
- 2010 HD Schrader - Woodwatchers and others. Ludwig Museum, Coblence (D), in collaboration with the Today Art Museum, Beijing (CN)^{c,}
- 2014 Cubes and Cracks. Kunstmuseum Bayreuth (D). Exhibition in the Neues Rathaus Bayreuth.

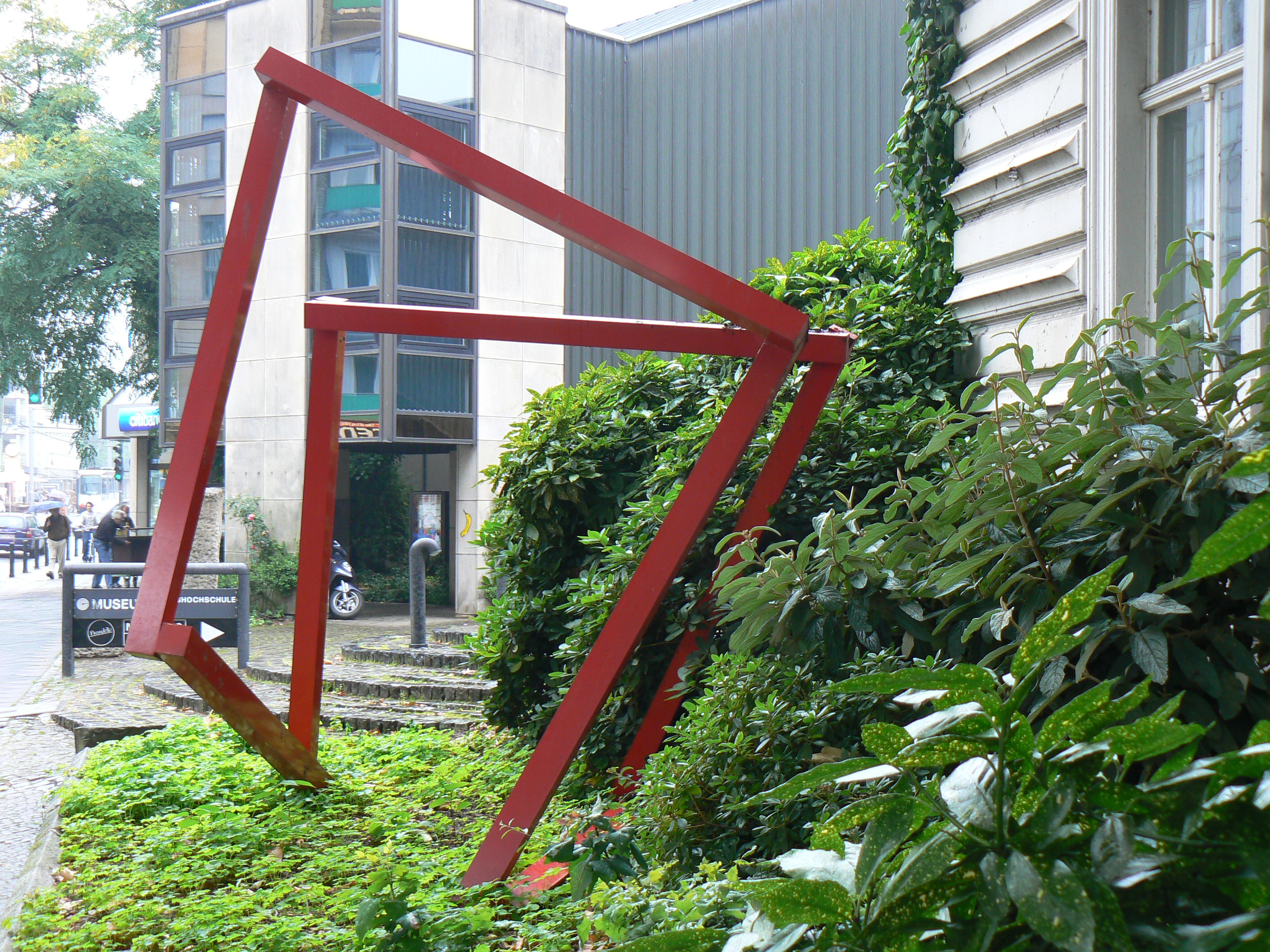
Elastic Cube (2000) at Kunstmuseum Gelsenkirchen (D)

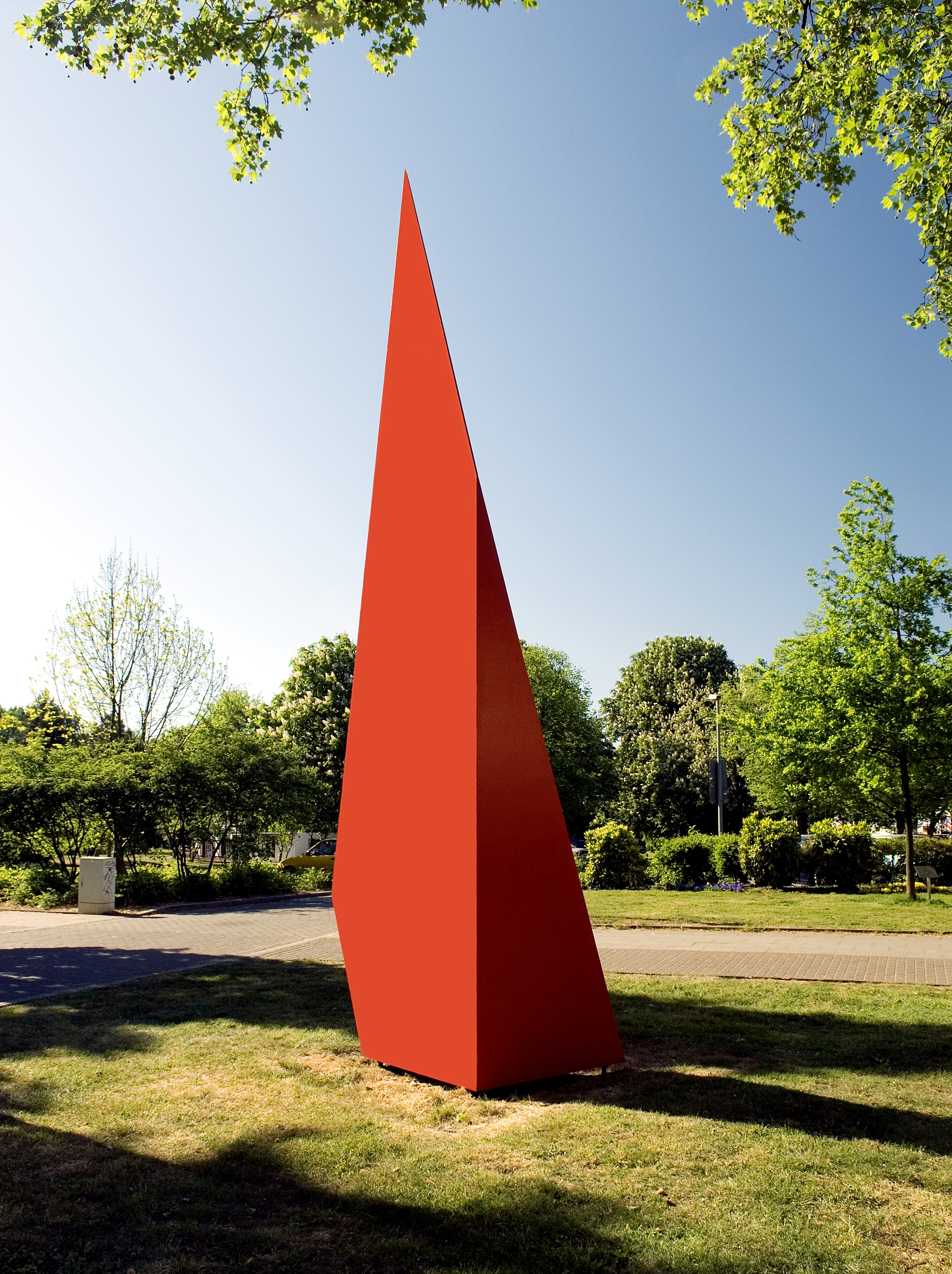
Cubecrack Nr. 1 (1996). Herne (D)

== Work ==
With their unusual angular or pointed forms Schader’s Cubecracks are initially perceived as alien bodies – whether encountered in urban surroundings or in the countryside. Their impact is reinforced by his use of signal red. As Bernhard Holeczek wrote, “how the things are made is clear to see, but not the idea they are derived from”. While a Cubecrack can be read as an autonomous sculptural sign, it at the same time also addresses the viewer as if an emissary from a foreign world, as a sign whose meaning can only be elucidated with closer knowledge of Schrader’s work. Indeed, Schrader’s Cubecracks suggest a rational system, that of a cube or a cuboid. Since 1974, Schrader has been working in drawings, paintings, objects, installations, animated film and sculptures to explore the idea of “the cube as a space of art”. Whereas certain sculptures such as those executed in plaster grow in the course of being shaped by the artist’s hand, or others such as those made of marble diminish by being hewn with hammer and chisel until they achieve their final form, Schrader’s Cubecracks arise in an entirely different manner. He dissects a cuboid form – in this case a hollow steel body in the shape of a cube – into individual sections. The cuboid Schrader used for his first Cubecracks that were exhibited in 1995/96 in the towns of Herne, Ingolstadt and Lübeck, should be imagined as three 2.5 metre cubes, one stacked upon another. Schrader cut these cuboid forms into twelve sections: in each town he distributed six of the twelve sections, bright red, in various public places, while the other six were displayed in the museum of each town. Viewers encountered them as different entities, each with its own dynamism and immediate symbolic presence. But one soon sensed that these objects were necessarily separate parts of a whole which, while no longer physically extant, was nonetheless implicitly present in each of its individual components. As Schrader commented, “It is of course what has been omitted that determines each single piece.”

Adopting an approach rooted in constructive concrete art, when Schrader begins to conceive a work of art he subjects himself to a prescribed system of rules. In the case of his Cubecracks this would be equivalent to specifying that each individual element should derive from a systematic process of dissecting the surface of a cuboid. The Cubecracks series vividly illustrates that while the ensuing formal language can be explained rationally it cannot be developed from simple deduction. Indeed, the individual Cubecracks are certainly not products of accident: on the contrary, the artist consciously selects his cuts so as to create what strikes him as the most interesting forms. They are the product of subjective decisions or his artistic instinct. Thus the steel bodies are not simply fragmentary forms as parts of a whole; rather, each one develops its own aesthetic impact and signification.

It is scarcely possible to define Schrader’s art in terms of a single element or an individual work. Nonetheless, for the series of works titled Viereck und Viereck (quadrilateral and quadrilateral), for example, the point of departure was a series of drawings depicting variations on two falling cubes, represented by two quadrilaterals. “The dynamism is therefore not the expression of the form but a process of transformation.” (Andrzej Turowski) It should be mentioned that variations of this series were already installed in several locations (Hünfeld, Hofbieber and Hilders, in East Hesse) as early as 1986 as part of the exhibition Kunststrasse Rhön (Rhön regional art trail).

In 1999, Schrader began producing the series of works titled Elastic Cubes. Each one is assembled from eight square-section steel tubes, just enough to allow viewers to picture the framework of a cube. At each of the eight corners of the cube two square-section steel elements are held together by means of an axle or shaft – like joints on a skeleton. Since four of the twelve edges that would be required to fully construct a cube are missing, this framework of edges can be twisted or contorted. Accordingly, each Elastic Cube assumes its own individual physiognomy, if not also a personal style of movement. “As ‘figures’ they cause us almost to forget their constructional method, or at least relegate it to the background.” (Knut Nievers) Describing the effect of Elastic Cubes, Klaus Reeh wrote: “Atmosphere is ultimately Schrader’s style and, not unlike an architect, he creates sculptures that exude a powerful and lasting presence in the space surrounding them. With his Elastic Cubes he succeeded in forging a particularly aesthetic atmosphere by using means that could hardly be more minimal and as part of a process that surprises us with its simplicity.”

In 2000, Schrader presented a group of works titled Cubes and Trees in the park of Schloss Agathenburg. Here, the cubes and cuboids were simply conceived as bare skeleton models made of wood or aluminium. The objects can be seen through and reduce the objects’ materiality. At the same time, the bright red frames transform the previously unremarkable sites in nature where they are installed into arenas for challenging and even poetic encounters between organic forms and geometrically abstracted purity and clarity. The objects were fotographed in spring, summer, autumn and winter.

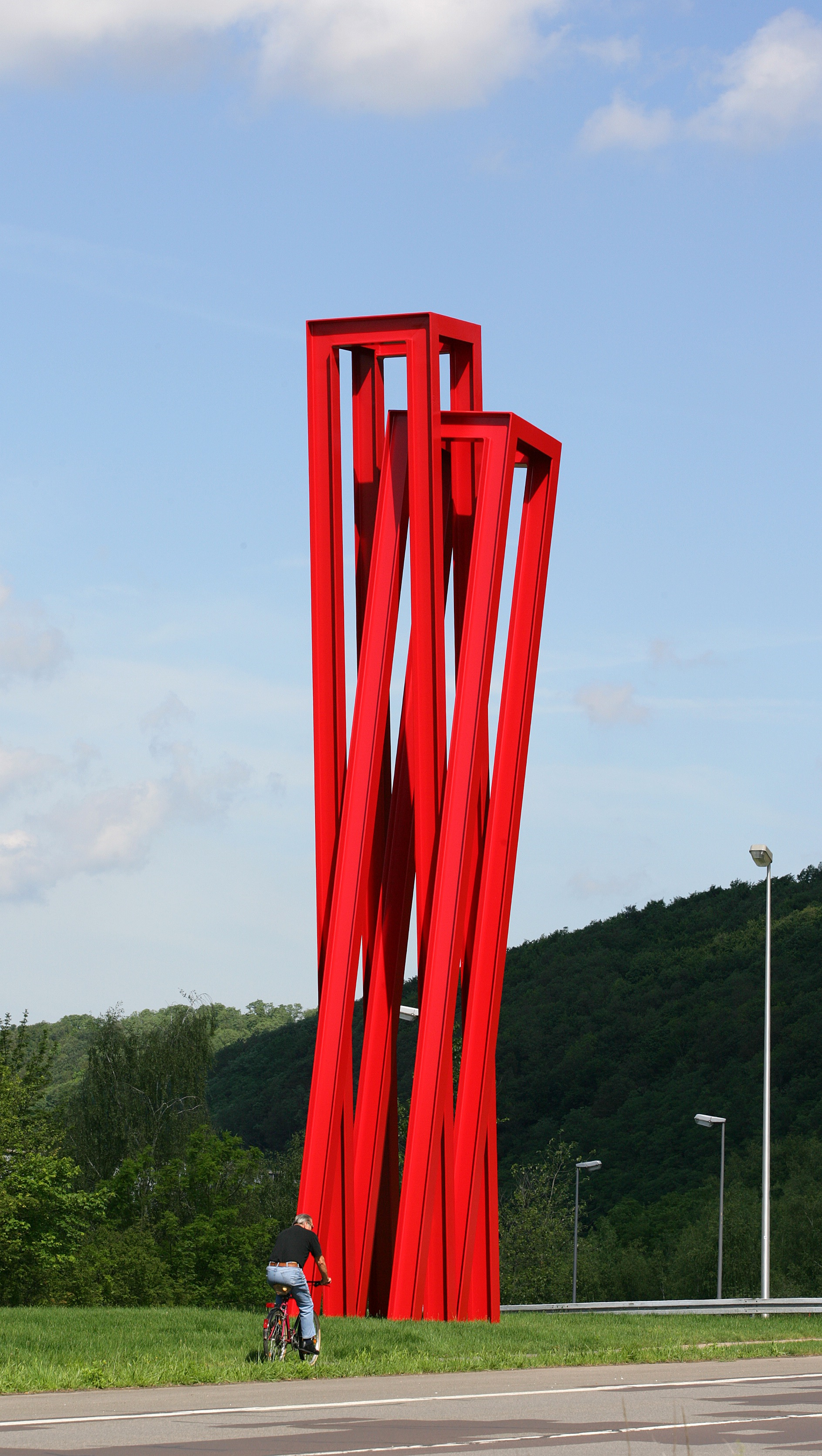
Kubushochzeit (Cube Wedding) (2007). Völklingen (D)

=== Works in public space ===
- 1973 Kugel im Kubus (Sphere in Cube), steel, forecourt of the Hamburger Kunstverein, Kunsthaus, Hamburg (until 1990); since 1994, installed in front of the Archäologisches Museum Hamburg in Hamburg-Harburg
- 1977 Cube in cube, stainless steel, Hamburg
- 1978-80 Gestaltung eines Schulwegs (design for a school path), white, red and black paving stones, a skeleton of cubes made of black-and-red varnished steel, at the school Kurt-Tucholsky-Gymnasium, Hamburg
- 1981 Steinspirale (Stone Spiral), granite, at the school Gymnasium Osdorf, Hamburg
- 1985 Viereck und Viereck (quadrilateral and quadrilateral), municipal park Hünfeld.
- 1986 Viereck und Viereck, Kunststation Kleinsassen; Viereck und Viereck, steel, sculpture park outside the Landesmuseum in Schloss Gottorf, Schleswig
- 1987 Viereck und Viereck, sculpture park Nortorf
- 1994 Viereck und Viereck, steel, Ingolstadt
- 1996 Kubuskoog (Cube Polder), wood, historic harbour in the area of the Vorderdeich, Brunsbüttel; Cubecrack No. 1–6, steel, Herne; Cubecrack No. 4 + 5, steel, Lübeck
- 2000 Elastic Cube, art museum Gelsenkirchen
- 2003 Kubushochzeit (Cube Wedding), steel, University of Applied Sciences Hof; Strömungen (Flows), stainless steel, Schifffahrtsamt (shipping office), Rostock; Cubecrack 2, steel, bestowal by the Schenning-Stiftung, Bergbaumuseum Rammelsberg, Goslar (“Goslar Sculpture of the year” 2003)
- 2005 Kubushochzeit, steel, Stormarn district administration, Bad Oldesloe
- 2006 Cubecrack Nr. 8, steel, Contemporanea, Oberbillig/Trier
- 2007 Kubushochzeit, steel, Völklingen

== Publications ==
- HD Schrader - Woodwatchers And Others. Catalogue for the exhibition in the Ludwig Museum Coblence, 12 December till 6 February 2011
- HD Schrader: Cubecracks. Catalogue for the exhibition in the Lichtwark Forum in DG Hyp, Hamburg. Published by the Deutsche Genossenschaft-Hypothekenbank AG, 2003 (with essays by Lothar Romain and Doris von Drathen)
- HD Schrader - Kunstraum Kubus. Catalogue for the exhibition in the Richard-Haizmann-Museum, Niebüll, 1998; in the Stadtgalerie Brunsbüttel, 1999; in the Stadtgalerie Kiel, 1999; in the Städtisches Museum, Gelsenkirchen, 1999; and in the Museen im Kulturzentrum, Rendsburg, 2000. Published by Richard-Haizmann-Museum, Niebüll, 1998
- HD Schrader - Cubecracks. Catalogue for the exhibition in the Städtischen Galerie des Emschertalmuseums, Herne, 1995; in the Museum für Konkrete Kunst, Ingolstadt, 1996; and in the Museum für Kunst und Kulturgeschichte der Hansestadt Lübeck, 1996. Published by Emschertalmuseum, Herne, 1995
