= Kanzem =

- Municipality
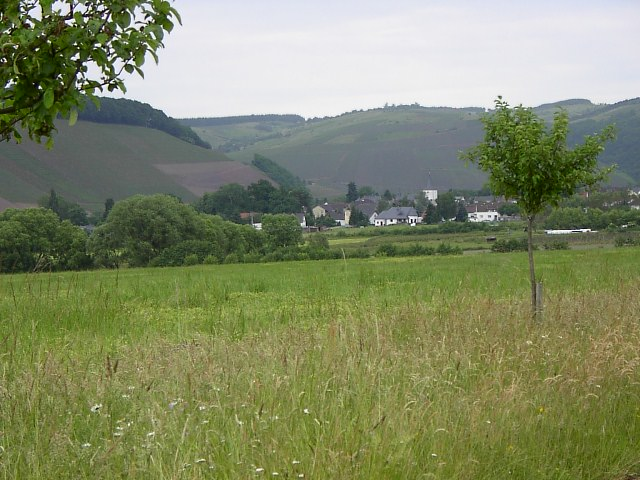

- Coat of arms

- Location of Kanzem within Trier-Saarburg district
- Interactive map of Kanzem
- Location within Germany Location within Rhineland-Palatinate
- Coordinates: 49°40′00″N 06°34′32″E
- Country: Germany
- State: Rhineland-Palatinate
- District: Trier-Saarburg
- Municipal assoc.: Konz

Government
  - Mayor (2019–24): Johann Peter Mertes (Ind.)

Area
  - Total: 4.29 km^{2} (1.66 sq mi)
- Elevation: 145 m (476 ft)

Population (2025-12-31)
  - Total: 628
  - Density: 146/km^{2} (379/sq mi)
- Time zone: UTC+01:00 (CET)
  - Summer (DST): UTC+02:00 (CEST)
- Postal codes: 54441
- Dialling codes: 06501
- Vehicle registration: TR
- Website: www.kanzem.de

Kanzem is a municipality in the Trier-Saarburg district, in Rhineland-Palatinate, Germany.

Located along the river Saar, the village of Kanzem is renowned for the quality of its wines. Its architecture is marked by the presence of several historic vineyards, including the Weingut Le Gallais, von Othegraven, Rautenstrauch and Cantzheim.

The winery Weingut von Othegraven, which is organized in the Association of German Prädikat Wine Estates (VDP), is located in this village. Günther Jauch is its owner.

== History ==
From 18 July 1946 to 6 June 1947 Kanzem, in its then municipal boundary, formed part of the Saar Protectorate.
