= Wawern =

- Municipality
- Coat of arms

- Location of Wawern within Trier-Saarburg district
- Interactive map of Wawern
- Location within Germany Location within Rhineland-Palatinate
- Coordinates: 49°39′12″N 6°33′0″E
- Country: Germany
- State: Rhineland-Palatinate
- District: Trier-Saarburg
- Municipal assoc.: Konz

Government
  - Mayor (2019–24): Karl-Peter Binz

Area
  - Total: 5.27 km^{2} (2.03 sq mi)
- Elevation: 160 m (520 ft)

Population (2025-12-31)
  - Total: 626
  - Density: 119/km^{2} (308/sq mi)
- Time zone: UTC+01:00 (CET)
  - Summer (DST): UTC+02:00 (CEST)
- Postal codes: 54441
- Dialling codes: 06501
- Vehicle registration: TR
- Website: www.wawern-saar.de

Wawern is a municipality in the Trier-Saarburg district, in Rhineland-Palatinate, Germany.

== History ==
From 18 July 1946 to 6 June 1947 Wawern, in its then municipal boundary, formed part of the Saar Protectorate. Before World War II and the Holocaust, Wawern was home to a small Jewish community.
