= Pellingen =

- Municipality
- Coat of arms

- Location of Pellingen within Trier-Saarburg district
- Interactive map of Pellingen
- Location within Germany Location within Rhineland-Palatinate
- Coordinates: 49°40′29″N 6°40′16″E
- Country: Germany
- State: Rhineland-Palatinate
- District: Trier-Saarburg
- Municipal assoc.: Konz

Government
  - Mayor (2019–24): Wolfgang Willems (CDU)

Area
  - Total: 7.21 km^{2} (2.78 sq mi)
- Elevation: 460 m (1,510 ft)

Population (2025-12-31)
  - Total: 1,237
  - Density: 172/km^{2} (444/sq mi)
- Time zone: UTC+01:00 (CET)
  - Summer (DST): UTC+02:00 (CEST)
- Postal codes: 54331
- Dialling codes: 06588
- Vehicle registration: TR
- Website: www.pellingen.de

Pellingen is a municipality in the Trier-Saarburg district, in Rhineland-Palatinate, Germany.

== History ==
From 18 July 1946 to 6 June 1947 Pellingen, in its then municipal boundary, formed part of the Saar Protectorate.
