= Wasserliesch =

- Municipality
- Coat of arms

- Location of Wasserliesch within Trier-Saarburg district
- Interactive map of Wasserliesch
- Location within Germany Location within Rhineland-Palatinate
- Coordinates: 49°42′40″N 6°32′12″E
- Country: Germany
- State: Rhineland-Palatinate
- District: Trier-Saarburg
- Municipal assoc.: Konz

Government
  - Mayor (2019–24): Thomas Michael Thelen (CDU)

Area
  - Total: 7.59 km^{2} (2.93 sq mi)
- Elevation: 120–347 m (394–1,138 ft)

Population (2025-12-31)
  - Total: 2,213
  - Density: 292/km^{2} (755/sq mi)
- Time zone: UTC+01:00 (CET)
  - Summer (DST): UTC+02:00 (CEST)
- Postal codes: 54332
- Dialling codes: 06501
- Vehicle registration: TR
- Website: wasserliesch.de

Wasserliesch is a municipality in the Trier-Saarburg district, in Rhineland-Palatinate, Germany.

== History ==
From 18 July 1946 to 6 June 1947 Wasserliesch, in its then municipal boundary, formed part of the Saar Protectorate.
