= Ellenz-Poltersdorf =

- Municipality
- Coat of arms

- Location of Ellenz-Poltersdorf within Cochem-Zell district
- Interactive map of Ellenz-Poltersdorf
- Location within Germany Location within Rhineland-Palatinate
- Coordinates: 50°6′51″N 7°14′2″E
- Country: Germany
- State: Rhineland-Palatinate
- District: Cochem-Zell
- Municipal assoc.: Cochem

Government
  - Mayor (2019–24): Heinz Dehren

Area
  - Total: 7.40 km^{2} (2.86 sq mi)
- Elevation: 95 m (312 ft)

Population (2025-12-31)
  - Total: 814
  - Density: 110/km^{2} (285/sq mi)
- Time zone: UTC+01:00 (CET)
  - Summer (DST): UTC+02:00 (CEST)
- Postal codes: 56821
- Dialling codes: 02673
- Vehicle registration: COC
- Website: www.ellenz-poltersdorf.de

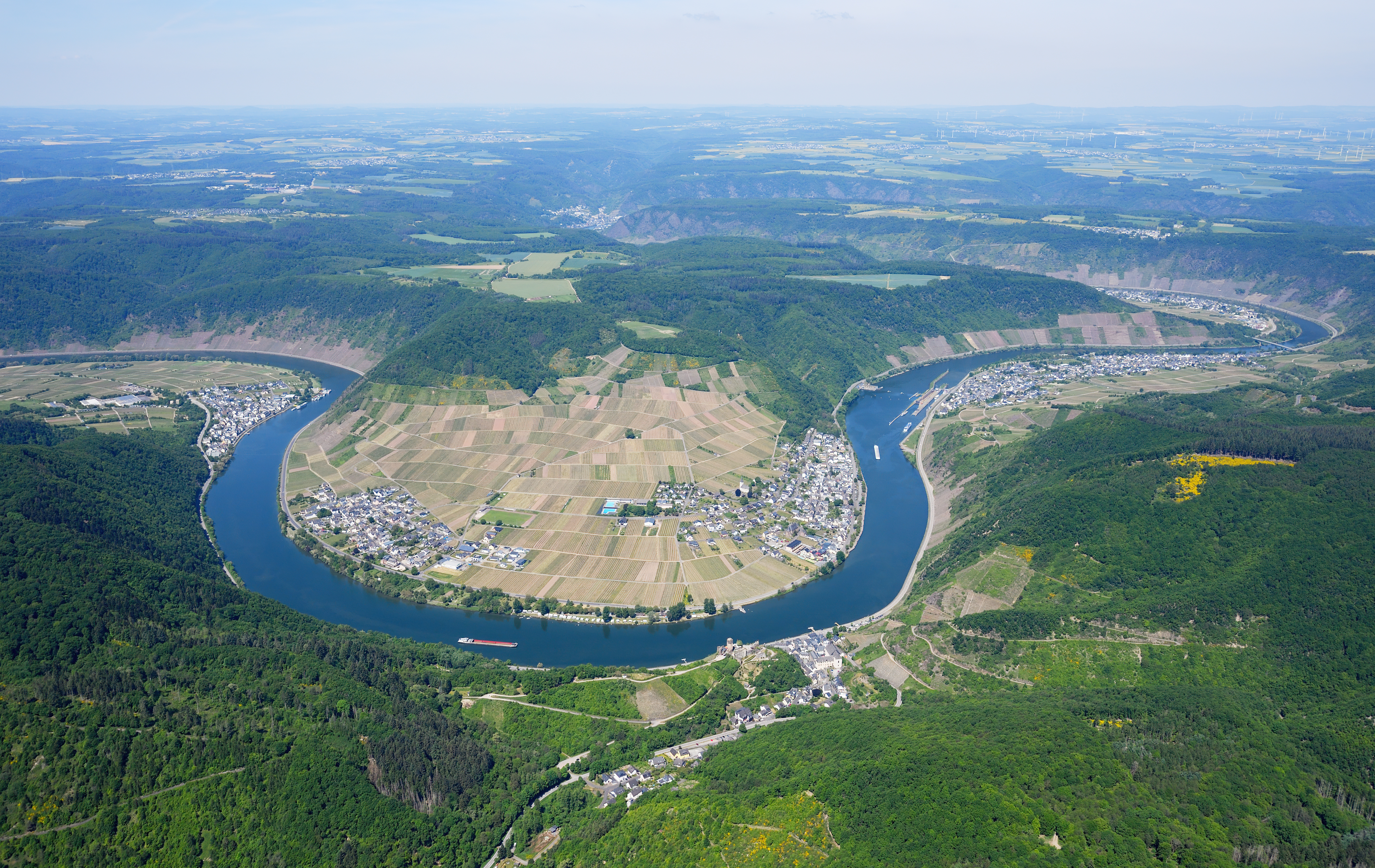
Aerial view of Ellenz-Poltersdorf

Ellenz-Poltersdorf is an Ortsgemeinde – a municipality belonging to a Verbandsgemeinde, a kind of collective municipality – in the Cochem-Zell district in Rhineland-Palatinate, Germany. The winegrowing centre belongs to the Verbandsgemeinde of Cochem, whose seat is in the like-named town.

== Geography ==
=== Location ===
The municipality lies on a bow in the river Moselle in the middle of the Cochemer Krampen, a 24-kilometre-long stretch of the Moselle made up of many winding bows. Ellenz-Poltersdorf lies on a point bar, which towards the southeast flattens out as it reaches the Moselle.

=== Nearby municipalities ===
The district seat of Cochem, which is also the seat of the Verbandsgemeinde administration, lies some 7 km downstream. Mayen is about 30 km away, and Koblenz is 50 km away. Directly across the Moselle is the small community of Beilstein, which is linked to Ellenz-Poltersdorf by ferry.

=== Extent of the municipal area ===
While Ellenz-Poltersdorf's municipal area stretches along both sides of the Moselle, mainly in the form of wooded land, the two constituent communities of Ellenz and Poltersdorf both lie on the river's left bank, where most of the vineyards are also found, and therefore most of the winegrowing estates within the municipal area. The best known of these is Ellenzer Goldbäumchen

=== Land use ===
Expressed as percentages of the total area, land use in the municipality breaks down thus (as at 31 December 2007, source: Statistisches Landesamt):

- Agricultural land – 28.1
- Wooded land – 56.4
- Open water – 4.9
- Residential and transport – 9.6
- Other – 1.0

== History ==
About 1100, Ellenz had its first documentary mention in a directory of holdings from the Karden Monastery. Poltersdorf's first documentary mention comes from 1178. Until the early 14th century, there was an Imperial Vogtei (Reichsvogtei) of Ellenz-Poltersdorf. The overlordship held by the Electorate of Trier was swept away in 1794 with the French Revolutionary occupation. In 1815 Ellenz-Poltersdorf was assigned to the Kingdom of Prussia at the Congress of Vienna, belonging until 1945 to the Rhine Province. Since 1946, it has been part of the then newly founded state of Rhineland-Palatinate.

== Politics ==
=== Municipal council ===
The council is made up of 12 council members, who were elected by majority vote at the municipal election held on 7 June 2009, and the honorary mayor as chairman.

=== Mayor ===
Ellenz-Poltersdorf's mayor is Heinz Dehren.

== Culture and sightseeing ==
=== Buildings ===
The following are listed buildings or sites in Rhineland-Palatinate’s Directory of Cultural Monuments:

==== Ellenz ====
- Saint Martin’s Catholic Church (Kirche St. Martin), Hauptstraße 1 – two-naved Gothic Revival aisleless church, quarrystone, façade with Gothic Revival stone figures, outdoor staircase, 1905

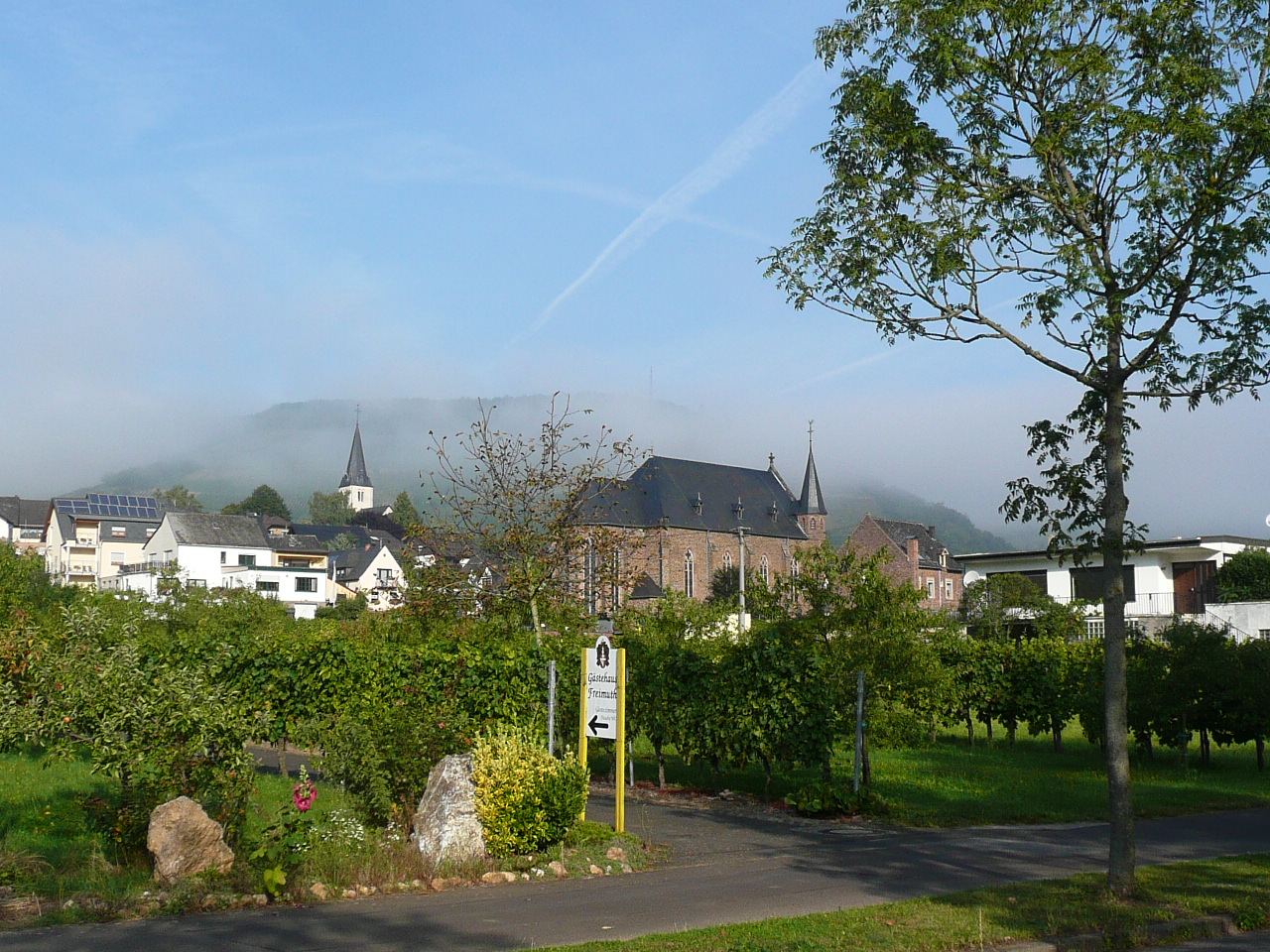
Saint Martin's Church

- Brunnenstraße – fountain
- Hauptstraße – Heiligenhäuschen (a small, shrinelike structure consecrated to a saint or saints)
- Hauptstraße 6 – one-floor quarrystone building, Renaissance Revival, 1907
- Hauptstraße 14 – former school; quarrystone building, mid 19th century
- Hauptstraße 16 – quarrystone building, about 1900
- Hauptstraße 24 – timber-frame house, partly solid, 16th century and later
- Hauptstraße 34 – timber-frame house, partly solid, half-hipped roof, from 1622
- Hauptstraße 37 – big L-shaped building, essentially possibly from the 16th century, front building, from 1911, essentially older
- Hauptstraße 41 – town hall; timber-frame house, partly solid, from 1541
- Hauptstraße 42 – quarrystone building, about 1845; Late Gothic inscription tablet with Archbishop Johann II of Baden’s coat of arms, stonemason Peter von Wederath
- Hauptstraße 45 – timber-frame house, partly solid, balloon frame, possibly from as far back as the 15th century (?), three-floor timber-frame addition, partly solid, 18th century
- Warriors’ memorial; pylon with relief
- On Moselweinstraße – Saint Sebastian’s Catholic Chapel (Sebastianuskapelle); post-Gothic aisleless church, from 1624; basalt wayside cross, from 1816
- Moselweinstraße 1 – basalt fountain, 19th century
- Moselweinstraße 6 – Late Historicist plastered building, partly timber-frame, about 1900
- Moselweinstraße 15 – quarrystone building, about 1845, expansion about 1900
- Moselweinstraße 16 – former Isenburg estate; sculpted overhanging ledge, Late Gothic (?)
- Moselweinstraße 22 – plastered building, partly timber-frame, possibly from the 17th century
- Neustraße 4 – plastered building, partly timber-frame, Swiss chalet style, 1914
- Neustraße 7 – late mediaeval vaulted cellar, hearth heating plate
- Rathausstraße 3 – timber-frame house, partly solid, plastered, hipped mansard roof, 18th century
- Schulstraße 1/3 – former Burghaus Warsberg; two-floor, originally three-floor quarrystone building, two round towers, possibly from later than 1473
- St.-Sebastianus-Straße – Saint Martin's Old Church (Alte Kirche St. Martin); Late Romanesque west tower, twin-naved, from 1494 and 1499, quire and sacristy from 1762; 15 grave crosses, 18th and 19th century; three sandstone reliefs, by Hans Ruprecht Hoffmann's circle or successors; whole complex of buildings with graveyard: Crucifixion group, from 1670; sculpted tomb, from 1892; graveyard cross, 19th century
- St.-Sebastianus-Straße 11 – solid building, essentially from the 16th century (?)

==== Poltersdorf ====
- Saint Andrew’s Catholic Church (branch church; Filialkirche St. Andreas), Kirchstraße – Late Gothic west tower with passageway through, 1509 (?), aisleless church, 1950-1952
- Goldbäumchenstraße 14 – former school; plastered building, mid 19th century
- Kirchstraße 8 – Gymnicher Hof, Knights of Malta commandry; timber-frame building, partly solid, balloon frame, essentially from the 16th century; timber-frame barn; beam pump; whole complex
- Kurfürstenstraße 30 – timber-frame house, partly solid, hipped mansard roof, about 1800
- Kurfürstenstraße 32 – timber-frame house, partly solid, plastered, hipped mansard roof, about 1790
- Kurfürstenstraße 34 – timber-frame house, partly solid, plastered, hipped mansard roof, about 1810
- Beside Raiffeisenstraße 9 – timber-frame house, partly solid, half-hipped roof, 18th or 19th century
- Raiffeisenstraße 15 – estate complex; building with hipped mansard roof, from 1792, commercial wing, estate portal from 1802
- on the Moselle – ferry tower; quarrystone building, conical roof, 19th century (?)
- Mountain chapel (Bergkapelle); plastered building, about 1625
- Bracher Kapelle (chapel); octagonal building with central plan, 1866
- Basalt wayside cross from 1743

== Economy and infrastructure ==
Within the limits of the constituent community of Ellenz, not far from the Fankel Weir, is found the RWE Power AG main control centre, from which all hydroelectric stations at weirs on the German sections of the Moselle and the Saar are controlled.
