= Tawern =

- Municipality
- Coat of arms

- Location of Tawern within Trier-Saarburg district
- Interactive map of Tawern
- Location within Germany Location within Rhineland-Palatinate
- Coordinates: 49°40′20″N 6°31′01″E
- Country: Germany
- State: Rhineland-Palatinate
- District: Trier-Saarburg
- Municipal assoc.: Konz

Government
  - Mayor (2019–24): Thomas Müller (CDU)

Area
  - Total: 10.08 km^{2} (3.89 sq mi)
- Elevation: 210 m (690 ft)

Population (2025-12-31)
  - Total: 2,700
  - Density: 270/km^{2} (690/sq mi)
- Time zone: UTC+01:00 (CET)
  - Summer (DST): UTC+02:00 (CEST)
- Postal codes: 54456
- Dialling codes: 06501
- Vehicle registration: TR

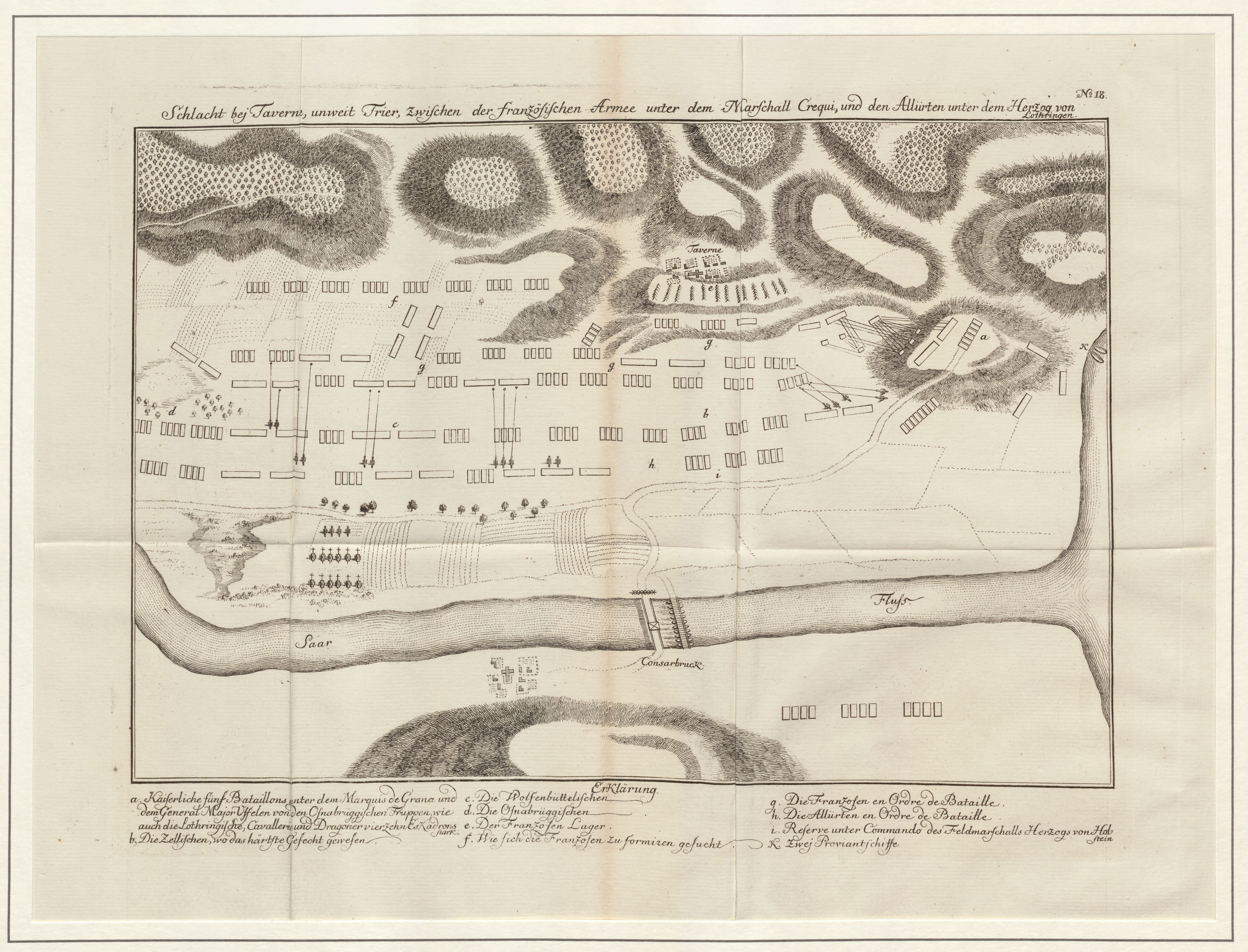
Battle of Tawern 1779

Tawern is a municipality in the Trier-Saarburg district, in Rhineland-Palatinate, Germany.

== History ==
From 18 July 1946 to 6 June 1947 Tawern, in its then municipal boundary, formed part of the Saar Protectorate.
