= Kiel University of Applied Sciences =

University in Kiel, Germany

- Hochschule für Angewandte Wissenschaften Kiel
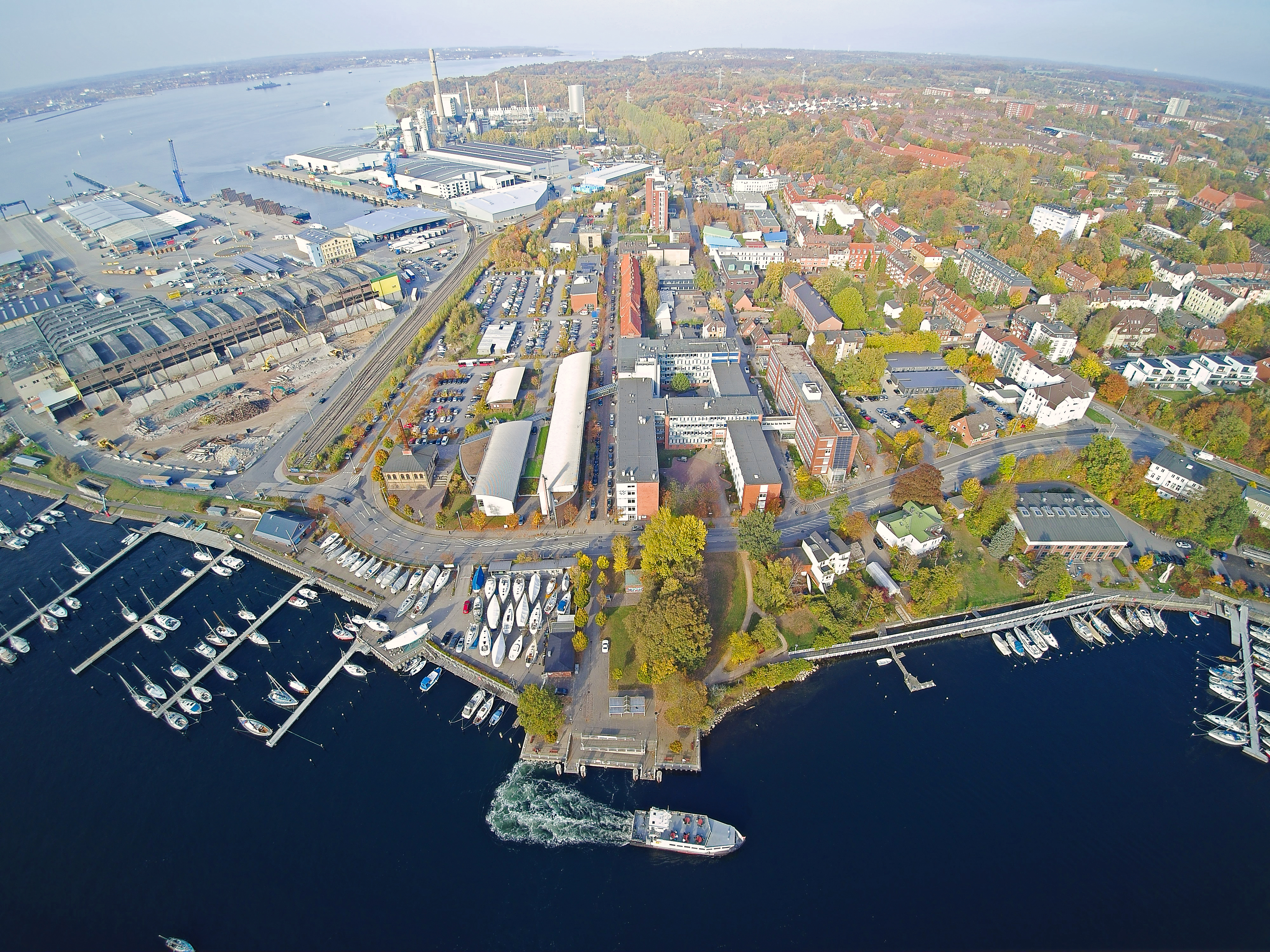
- The premises of the Kiel University of Applied Sciences reach from the river mouth of the Schwentine in the bottom part of the picture to the upper part of the picture with the local power plant and a small piece of forest adjacent to it. The ferry in the lower part of the picture connects the eastern and western part of the Fjord of Kiel.
- Established: 1969
- President: Björn Christensen
- Students: 7,411
- Location: Kiel, Schleswig-Holstein, Germany; 54°19′57″N 10°10′49″E
- Website: www.haw-kiel.de

The Kiel University of Applied Sciences (German: Hochschule für Angewandte Wissenschaften Kiel or HAW Kiel) is a University of Applied Sciences, established in 1969. It is one of three public institutions of higher learning in Kiel, Germany. It provides around 30 Bachelor's and master's degrees, supplementary degrees and continuing education courses by the faculties of Agriculture, Business Management, Computer Science & Electrical Engineering, Mechanical Engineering, Media and Social Work and Health.

The campus contains one large and a few smaller cafeterias, as well as two dorms. Furthermore, a planetarium, called the Mediendom, a museum of computers and a star observatory are associated with the University of Applied Sciences.

In addition to the main campus in Kiel, the University of Applied Sciences has sites in Neumünster and Osterrönfeld.

== Organization ==
=== Departments ===
The HAW Kiel is divided in the following departments:

- Agriculture
- Computer Science and Electrical Engineering
- Manufacturing Systems Engineering
- Media
- Social Work
- Economics

=== Courses ===
38 study courses are offered in the six departments. Therefrom, 19 are Bachelor courses. Beneath typical courses like Economics and Social Work, there are also two maritime ones: Naval architecture and Technology and Offshore Technology which can only be studied at the HAW Kiel.

== International Relationships ==
The HAW Kiel is in close contact to international universities. Thereby many student exchange programs as well as mutual recognition of study performances can be provided. The International Office coordinates approximately 530 students from over 80 countries, organized by the Erasmus Programme.

Besides these efforts the Kiel University of Applied Sciences offers two entirely English-taught master's programs, Master of Science in Information Engineering and Master of industrial engineering. The latter is an online degree programme.

== Art and Cultural Features of the Campus ==
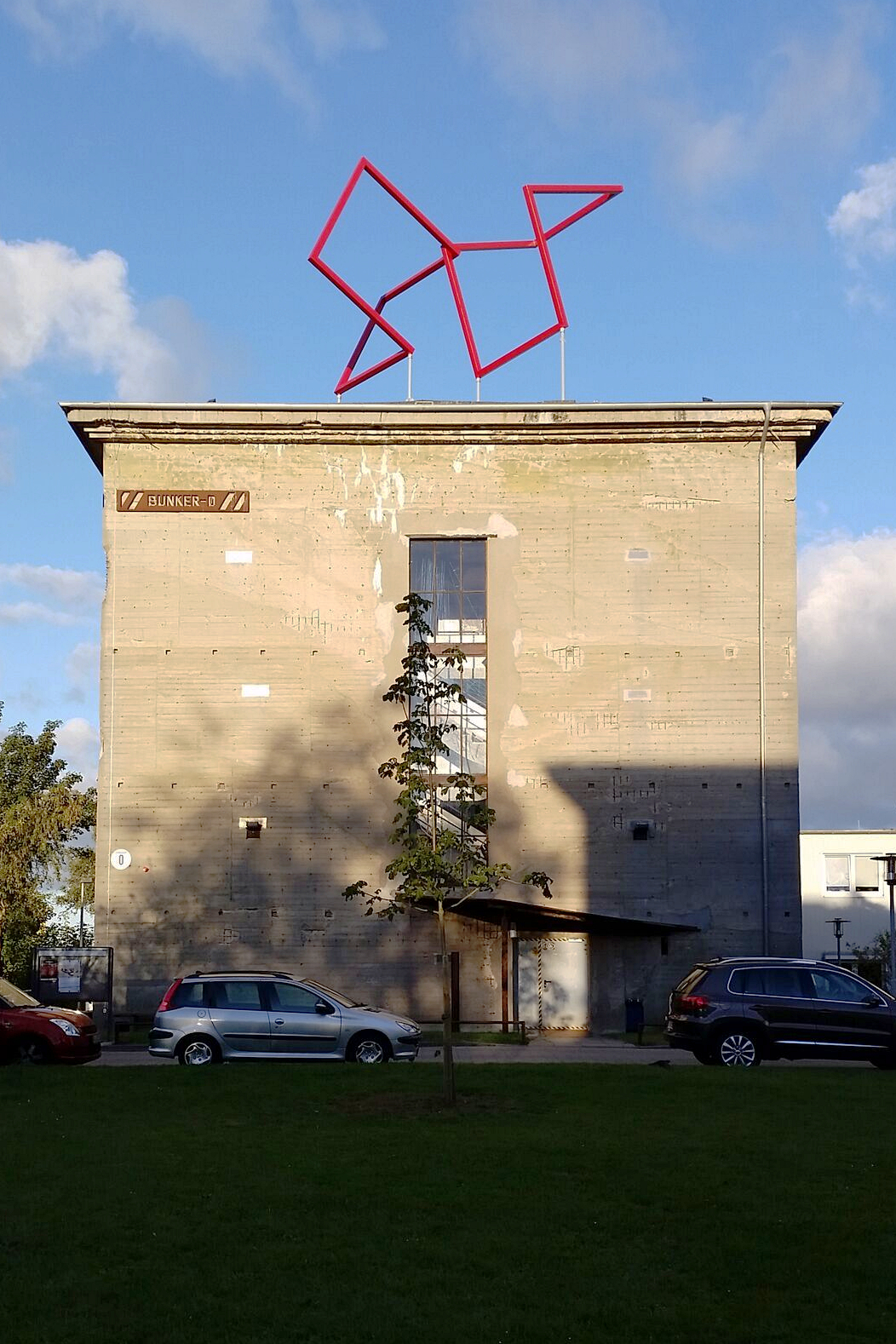
The centre of culture and communication Bunker D. On the roof the Kubus Balance sculpture can be seen.

After having acquired three art pieces in 1994 due to wish of the Ministry of Education, Science and Cultural Affairs to present the Campus of the University of Applied Sciences it started to expand the collection more and more. Today more than 300 pieces of art can be found under the title of "CampusKunst-D 450 Kunstwerke" (CampusArt-D 450 pieces of art) on the Campus.

Under the title "Cultural Isle of Dietrichsdorf" (Kulturinsel Dietrichsdorf) the HAW maintains several cultural establishments that do not only aim to provide cultural enrichment for the students but to the general people, too. That Among these are the Mediadome, a computer museum and an astronomical observatory. In addition to that, the administration began establishing a centre of culture and communication in an old air raid shelter called Bunker-D in 2006. Since 2014 the building contains a café, a cinema and a gallery with frequently changing exhibitions. In September 2015 a sculpture named KUBUS BALANCE by HD Schrader, which had been made in 1990, was placed on top of the building.

== Former students ==
Ingo Kühl (* 1953), German painter, sculptor and architect.

== Print Media ==
Since September 2010 the campus magazine "viel." is published once a semester. Its focus is on Education, research and projects on the campus but also features more general topics. The editorial staff is composed of students and employees of the university's marketing and communications department.

The student magazine "plietsch" ist a project of the Faculty of Media. Taking part in the respective elective module students practically improve their knowledge and skills in layouting and writing the editorial. Contrary to the "viel.", which aims at a broad target group, the plietsch targets mainly students. Its first issue was published on 23 April 2015.

== Student life ==
By the time, the students of the HAW Kiel have launched a variety of interdisciplinary activities.

=== Raceyard ===
Since 2006 the university's racing team Raceyard takes part in the German Competition of the Formula Student Germany in Hockenheim and also in international Competitions such as the Formula SAE e.g. in Silverstone. The racing team has been awarded with the "Best Newcomer"- and "Acceleration"-Award by the Formular Student Germany respectively in 2006 and 2007. the Goblet of Acceleration in Silverstone and Hockenheim were also successfully achieved by the team in 2009. Since 2011 Raceyard only builds electric racing cars.

=== Sports ===
In cooperation with the University Kiel (Christian-Albrechts-Universität zu Kiel), they offer a wide range of varies sport courses for a small budget. Students can choose every semester between attending these weekly courses or going in the gym right next to Kiel University.

=== Campus RadioAktiv ===
This is the campus radio, organized and made by students. It was founded in 2012 and is on air every Thursday morning. The project was launched by the Media department but can be visited by all students.

=== Campus-TV ===
Since 2008, students studying in the Media department produce journalistic video material which can be found on the website of the HAW Kiel. They as well are published on YouTube since 2010.

=== Baltic Thunder ===
In 2008 the Baltic Thunder team started to take part in the Racing Aeolus in Den Helder, Netherlands. Since 2016 the team enters the competition with two self-built vehicles.

=== TomKyle AUV ===
The TomKyle AUV Team is a student work group dedicated to the development and programming of autonomous underwater vehicles in collaboration with the GEOMAR Helmholtz Centre for Ocean Research Kiel. The project was initiated in January 2013 by the Faculty of Computer Sciences and Electrical Engineering.

In 2016, the group's AUV won the second place at the SAUC-E competition.
