= Wellen, Rhineland-Palatinate =

Wellen
- Municipality
- Coat of arms

- Location of Wellen within Trier-Saarburg district
- Interactive map of Wellen
- Location within Germany Location within Rhineland-Palatinate
- Coordinates: 49°40′06″N 6°25′58″E
- Country: Germany
- State: Rhineland-Palatinate
- District: Trier-Saarburg
- Municipal assoc.: Konz

Government
  - Mayor (2019–24): Hans Dostert

Area
  - Total: 3.09 km^{2} (1.19 sq mi)
- Elevation: 150 m (490 ft)

Population (2025-12-31)
  - Total: 789
  - Density: 255/km^{2} (661/sq mi)
- Time zone: UTC+01:00 (CET)
  - Summer (DST): UTC+02:00 (CEST)
- Postal codes: 54441
- Dialling codes: 06584
- Vehicle registration: TR
- Website: www.wellen-mosel.de

Wellen (German pronunciation: [ˈvɛlən]) is a municipality in the Trier-Saarburg district, in Rhineland-Palatinate, Germany.

== History ==
From 18 July 1946 to 6 June 1947 Wellen, in its then municipal boundary, formed part of the Saar Protectorate.
