= Konz =

- Town
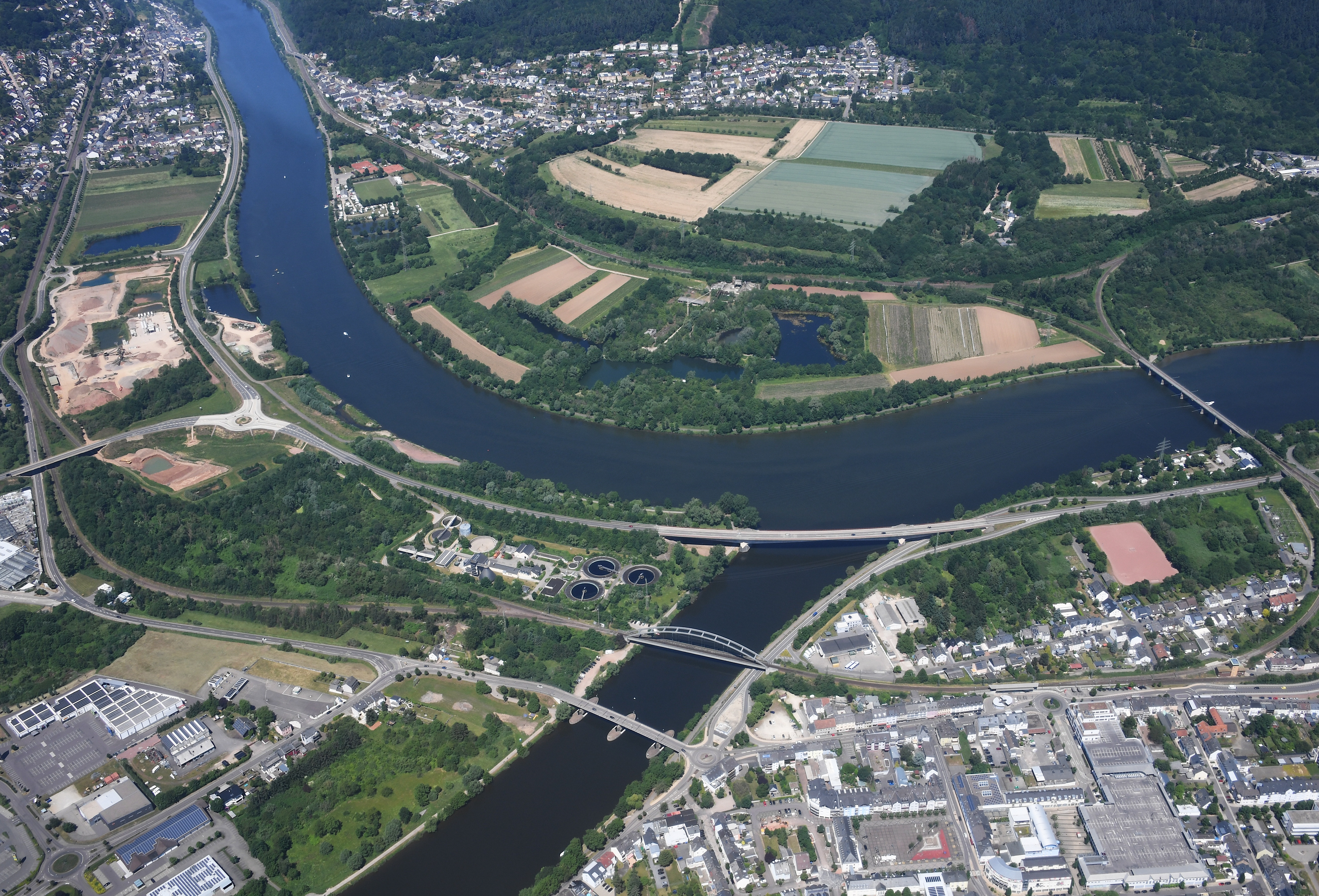
- Confluence of the rivers Saar and Moselle

- Coat of arms

- Location of Konz within Trier-Saarburg district
- Interactive map of Konz
- Location within Germany Location within Rhineland-Palatinate
- Coordinates: 49°42′N 6°35′E
- Country: Germany
- State: Rhineland-Palatinate
- District: Trier-Saarburg
- Municipal assoc.: Konz

Government
  - Mayor (2019–24): Joachim Weber (CDU)

Area
  - Total: 44.56 km^{2} (17.20 sq mi)
- Elevation: 130 m (430 ft)

Population (2025-12-31)
  - Total: 18,099
  - Density: 406.2/km^{2} (1,052/sq mi)
- Time zone: UTC+01:00 (CET)
  - Summer (DST): UTC+02:00 (CEST)
- Postal codes: 54329
- Dialling codes: 06501
- Vehicle registration: TR
- Website: www.konz.de

Konz (German pronunciation: [kɔnts]; Latin: Contionacum) is a city in the Trier-Saarburg district, in Rhineland-Palatinate, Germany. It is situated at the confluence of the rivers Saar and Moselle, approx. 8 km southwest of Trier and located near the border with Luxembourg.

Konz is the seat of the Verbandsgemeinde ("collective municipality") Konz. The following villages are part of the municipality Konz:

- Canet
- Filzen
- Hamm
- Karthaus
- Könen
- Krettnach
- Kommlingen
- Niedermennig
- Oberemmel
- Obermennig
- Roscheid
- Pellingen

== History ==
From 18 July 1946 until 6 June 1947 Konz, in its then municipal boundary, formed part of the Saar Protectorate.

== Population ==
Locality	December 2007	December 2008
Konz	12,193	12,238
Filzen	370	356
Hamm	106	111
Kommlingen	393	395
Könen	2304	2275
Krettnach	494	494
Niedermennig	858	870
Oberemmel	1627	1637
Obermennig	277	281

As of February 2024, the general population is 19,142.

== Museums ==
- Roscheider Hof Open Air Museum
