= Oberbillig =

- Municipality
- Coat of arms

- Location of Oberbillig within Trier-Saarburg district
- Interactive map of Oberbillig
- Location within Germany Location within Rhineland-Palatinate
- Coordinates: 49°42′39.73″N 6°30′16.19″E
- Country: Germany
- State: Rhineland-Palatinate
- District: Trier-Saarburg
- Municipal assoc.: Konz

Government
  - Mayor (2019–24): Andreas Beiling (CDU)

Area
  - Total: 5.36 km^{2} (2.07 sq mi)
- Elevation: 148 m (486 ft)

Population (2025-12-31)
  - Total: 959
  - Density: 179/km^{2} (463/sq mi)
- Time zone: UTC+01:00 (CET)
  - Summer (DST): UTC+02:00 (CEST)
- Postal codes: 54331
- Dialling codes: 06501
- Vehicle registration: TR
- Website: www.oberbillig.de

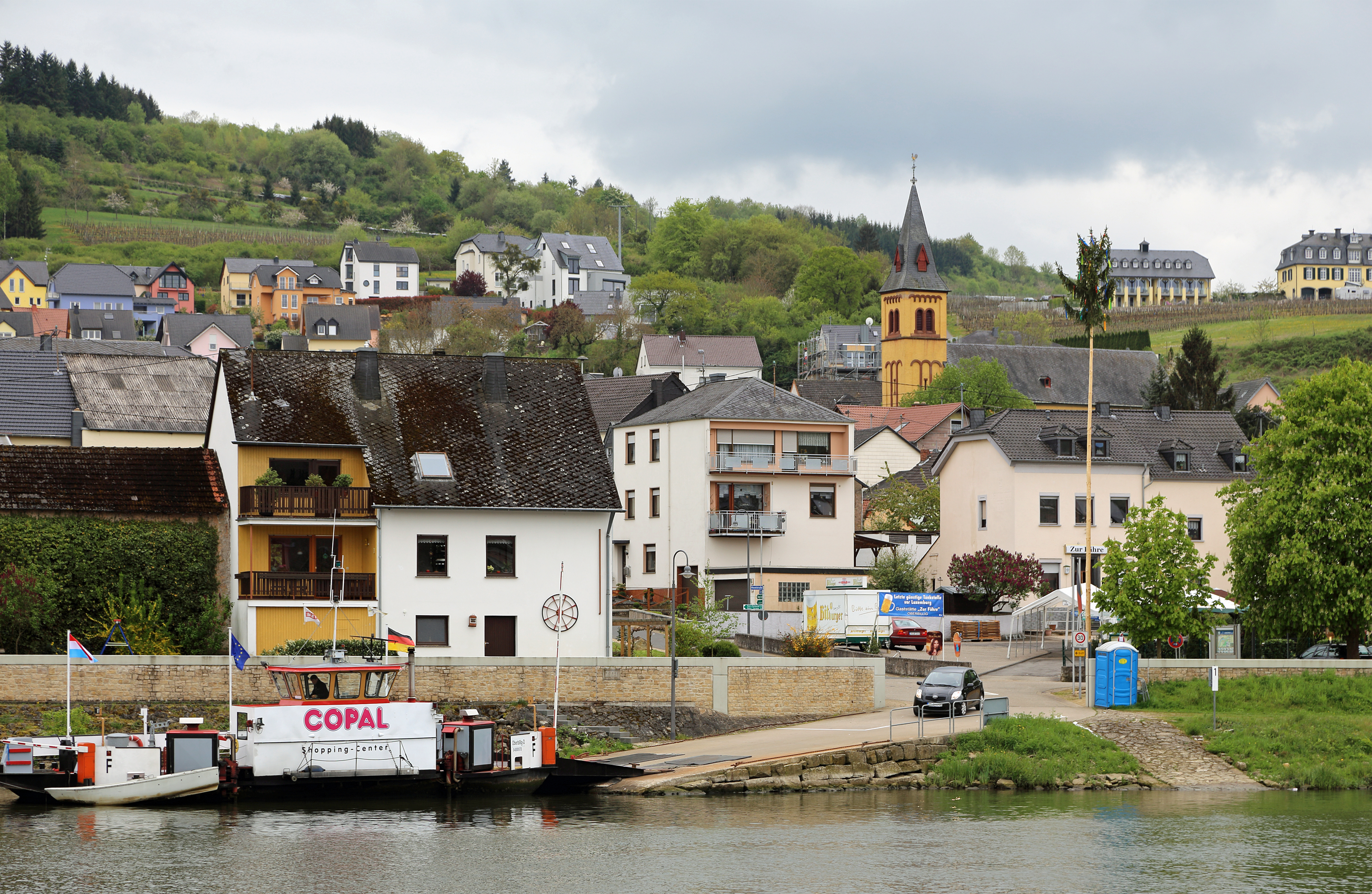
Oberbillig

Oberbillig is a municipality in the Trier-Saarburg district, in Rhineland-Palatinate, Germany.

The municipality is situated on the Moselle river, a situation reflected in the design of its coat of arms.

There is a car ferry across the Moselle that connects Oberbillig in Germany to the city of Wasserbillig in Luxemburg.

== History ==
The town's foundation dates back to the Roman era. During the Middle Ages Oberbillig as well as the neighboring town of Wasserbillig used to be one community, called Billig and belonged to the grand duchy of Luxembourg until the two parts were split after the Vienna Congress. Oberbillig was handed over to Prussia, while Wasserbillig remained luxembourgish. A small church building dates from 1864

From 18 July 1946 to 6 June 1947 Oberbillig, in its then municipal boundary, formed part of the Saar Protectorate.

== See also ==
- Wasserbillig § Geography
