= Onsdorf =

- Municipality
- Coat of arms

- Location of Onsdorf within Trier-Saarburg district
- Interactive map of Onsdorf
- Location within Germany Location within Rhineland-Palatinate
- Coordinates: 49°38′39.27″N 6°28′56.56″E
- Country: Germany
- State: Rhineland-Palatinate
- District: Trier-Saarburg
- Municipal assoc.: Konz

Government
  - Mayor (2019–24): Klaus Fuchs (SPD)

Area
  - Total: 3.42 km^{2} (1.32 sq mi)
- Elevation: 295 m (968 ft)

Population (2025-12-31)
  - Total: 134
  - Density: 39.2/km^{2} (101/sq mi)
- Time zone: UTC+01:00 (CET)
  - Summer (DST): UTC+02:00 (CEST)
- Postal codes: 54456
- Dialling codes: 06584
- Vehicle registration: TR

Onsdorf is a municipality in the Trier-Saarburg district, in Rhineland-Palatinate, Germany.

== History ==
From 18 July 1946 to 6 June 1947 Onsdorf, in its then municipal boundary, formed part of the Saar Protectorate.
