= Wiltingen =

- Municipality
- Coat of arms

- Location of Wiltingen within Trier-Saarburg district
- Interactive map of Wiltingen
- Location within Germany Location within Rhineland-Palatinate
- Coordinates: 49°39′32″N 6°35′24″E
- Country: Germany
- State: Rhineland-Palatinate
- District: Trier-Saarburg
- Municipal assoc.: Konz

Government
  - Mayor (2019–24): Christoph Schmitz (CDU)

Area
  - Total: 16.01 km^{2} (6.18 sq mi)
- Elevation: 140 m (460 ft)

Population (2025-12-31)
  - Total: 1,358
  - Density: 84.82/km^{2} (219.7/sq mi)
- Time zone: UTC+01:00 (CET)
  - Summer (DST): UTC+02:00 (CEST)
- Postal codes: 54459
- Dialling codes: 06501
- Vehicle registration: TR
- Website: www.wiltingen.de

Wiltingen (German pronunciation: [ˈvɪltɪŋən]) is a municipality in the Trier-Saarburg district, in Rhineland-Palatinate, Germany.

== History ==
From 18 July 1946 to 6 June 1947 Wiltingen, in its then municipal boundary, formed part of the Saar Protectorate.
