= Bartłomiej Bernatowicz =

Polish sculptor

Bartłomiej Bernatowicz (died on 12 February 1730) was a Polish sculptor, based in Warsaw, active in the Polish–Lithuanian Commonwealth.

== Biography ==
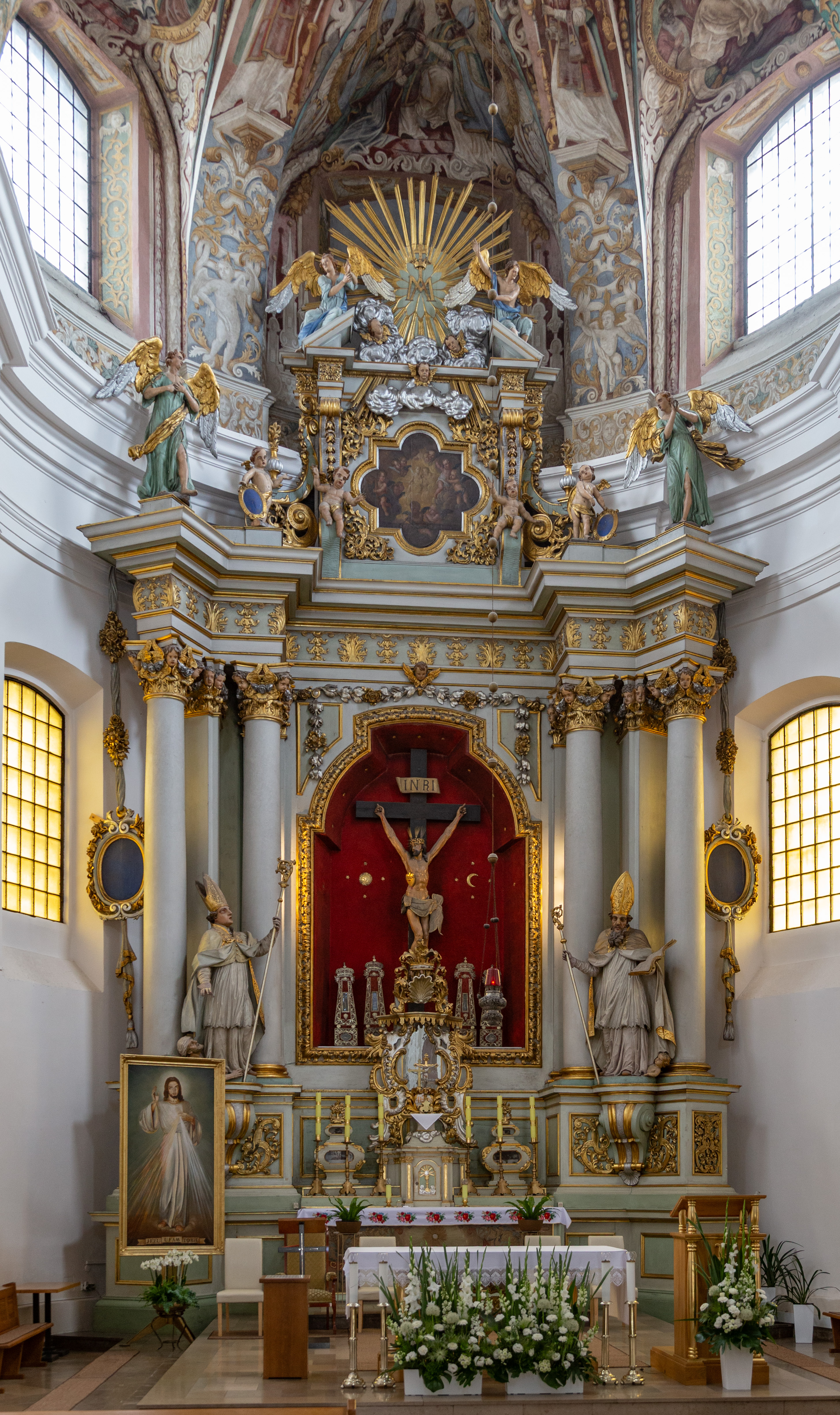
Main altar in the Church of Our Lady of Graces and St. Adalbert in Łowicz, one of the three surviving works securely attributed to Bernatowicz

He lived and worked in the New Town of Warsaw. In 1718, he concluded a contract with Jan Fryderyk Sapieha for altars in the Jesuit Saint-Sauveur Church in Brest. He subsequently worked on altars for the Piarist churches in Łowicz, the Church of the Holy Spirit in Lublin, and the Church of the Immaculate Conception of the Blessed Virgin Mary in Lublin; in 1728, he received payment for the altar of St. Anthony in St. Mary’s Church in Toruń.

He died on 12 February 1730. He was buried in the Franciscan church in the New Town of Warsaw. His widow later paid Jakub Dzierżawski remuneration for executing, together with her husband, the altar of the Missionary church in Siemiatycze.

In addition, a number of sculptural works in churches—mainly in Warsaw—are attributed to him and his workshop. He often collaborated with the architect Carlo Antonio Bay. Johann Georg Plersch and Stanisław Cieślikiewicz were likely his collaborators and pupils. Karpowicz regarded the pair of altars in the transept of the Discalced Carmelite church in Warsaw (ca. 1720–1730) as a key work in Warsaw attributed to Bartłomiej Bernatowicz.

Bernatowicz is regarded as one of the most outstanding sculptors of the first quarter of the 18th century in Poland. His works are valued for the high quality of their figural sculpture. The human figure in his oeuvre is massive and athletic, yet animated, thrusting into space with sharp, restless projections of drapery. Karpowicz identifies in his work the influence of the classicizing sculpture of the Sobieski period, as well as strong Italian influences, including inspiration from Giovanni Lorenzo Bernini, probably mediated through Baldassarre Fontana, an Italian stucco artist active in Poland.

== Bibliography ==
- Sito, Jakub; Betlej, Andrzej (2004). "Lubelskie dzieła Bartłomieja Bernatowicza". Studia nad sztuką renesansu i baroku. 5.
