= Helsinki Foundation for Human Rights (Poland) =

Human rights organization

- Formation: 1989
- Type: Non-profit NGO
- Purpose: Human rights, activism
- Location: Wiejska 16 Street 00-490 Warsaw Poland
- Region served: Poland
- Product: non profit human rights advocacy
- Website: https://hfhr.pl/en
- Formerly called: The Helsinki Committee

Helsinki Foundation for Human Rights (Poland) is an international non-governmental organization focused on human rights, based in Poland.

== History ==
The Helsinki Committee in Poland was established in 1982 and operated underground until 1989. The Committee first made its activities public in 1983, when it published a report titled "Human Rights and Civil Rights in the Polish People’s Republic During Martial Law from December 13, 1981, to December 31, 1982." The report was secretly smuggled out of Poland to Western countries and subsequently published abroad.

One of the founders and active members of the Committee was Marek Antoni Nowicki.

The Helsinki Foundation for Human Rights was established in Warsaw in 1989, following the political changes in Poland, and was registered in 1990. The Helsinki Committee established a network of aid committees set up within religious organizations: parishes and dioceses. The organization "Solidarity" was also utilized in establishing a network of experts and staff. Information was gathered through underground activists, as well as judges, prosecutors, and lawyers who collaborated with the committee.

In 1989, Andrzej Rzepliński joined the Committee. At the Foundation, he was mainly involved in providing legal assistance and also served as its treasurer. From 2000 to 2007, he served as secretary of its board.

Its activists participated in drafting the Polish Constitution, including the Charter of Rights and Freedoms. Since 2007, the Foundation has held consultative status with the United Nations Economic and Social Council (ECOSOC).

== Activities ==
- Since 1990, the Foundation has organized the International Summer School on Human Rights. The program is intended for journalists, civil servants, and representatives of non-governmental organizations working in the field of human rights in Central and Eastern Europe, the former Soviet Union, and Central Asia.
- The Foundation runs educational programs for university and secondary school students, including workshops for young journalists and a competition for master's theses on human rights.
- Since 2001, the Foundation has organized the WATCH DOCS Human Rights in Film International Film Festival, which features films addressing human rights issues.
- In 1993, the Foundation organized the 14th Dalai Lama's first visit to Poland.
- The Foundation carries out a strategic litigation program in particularly important legal cases and provides legal advice in cases involving human rights violations.
- The Foundation's lawyers monitor the protection of freedom of speech in Poland.
- Since the early 1990s, the Foundation has provided legal assistance to refugees and migrants.
- In 2022, a court in Warsaw ruled that the decision to deport a Syrian national was unlawful, following a case brought by the Helsinki Foundation for Human Rights. The asylum seeker was returned to the border with Belarus, despite having expressed a wish to submit an application for asylum in Poland.
