= Marek Antoni Nowicki =

Polish lawyer

Marek Antoni Nowicki (born 5 March 1953, Siemiatycze) is a human rights lawyer. He has been a member of the Human Rights Advisory Panel of the United Nations Mission in Kosovo since January 2007, and from January 2008 became its president. Nowicki was a United Nations-appointed International Ombudsman in Kosovo from July 2000 to December 2005. He was also a member of the European Commission of Human Rights in Strasbourg from March 1993 until 31 October 1999. From December 1997 to November 1998, he served as vice-president of the Second Chamber of this commission.

From 1982, during the period of martial law in Poland, Nowicki was a columnist for the underground press, a dissident with the Polish Solidarity movement. At the same time, he was co-founder and activist of the Helsinki Committee in Poland. From 1989 to 1991 he was a spokesperson for this committee as well as the co-author of its reports on the human rights situation in Poland, including a report surrounding Poland under martial law, published in 1983. Due to his activities within the human rights movement, Nowicki was prohibited from practising as a lawyer during this time.

From 1990 to 1993, he was a member of the executive committee of the International Helsinki Federation of Human Rights (IHF) in Vienna. From 2011 to 2012, he served as IHF president, where he would participate in fact-finding missions in Romania, Bulgaria and Albania.

Alongside his presidency of the IHF, Nowicki foundered the Human Rights Commission of the Polish Bar, serving also as its president. He has been a member of the Polish Bar since 1987. From 1995 to 1998, he was also a member of the National Council of the Polish Bar.

Nowicki was a founding member of the Helsinki Foundation for Human Rights in Warsaw and became its president in November 2010 (till January 2013). Since 2015 he is a chairman of the council of this Foundation.

He was a member of the council of the Human Rights Institute of the International Bar Association (HRI-IBA) and of the advisory council of the European Roma Rights Centre in Budapest. Today, he is still an active member of the Advisory Council of the International Centre for the Legal Protection of Human Rights in London (INTERIGHTS).

He was one of the "eminent lawyers" appointed by the Parliamentary Assembly of the Council of Europe to assess the legal and human rights situation in Moldova (2000) and Azerbaijan (2001).

From 2012to 2013, Nowicki was a member of the Committee of Special Advisors to the Council of Europe's Committee of Ministers, dealing with just satisfaction in cases of human rights violations.

In 2006 and 2007, the Council of Europe asked him to serve as a human rights expert during the evaluation of the compatibility of the legal systems of Georgia and the Russian Federation with the standards of the European Convention on Human Rights (ECHR). He served as a human rights expert for the European Commission for Democracy through Law (Venice Commission) and the Directorate General of Human Rights and Legal Affairs of the Council of Europe.

From March 2003 to September 2006, Nowicki was a Polish member of the EU Network of Independent Experts on Fundamental Rights.

Nowicki was nominated by the Polish government on three occasions; in 1998, 2002, and 2009, as one of three candidates for the post of European Court of Human Rights judge.

In September 2005, he was nominated by the Committee of Ministers as one of three candidates for the post of the Commissioner for Human Rights of the Council of Europe (elections on 5 October 2018: second after Thomas Hammarberg, the elected Commissioner).

Since July 2013 he is a member of the selection panel for the Václav Havel Human Rights Prize on behalf of the parliamentary assembly of the Council of Europe.

Nowicki is the author of dozens of books and hundreds of articles on human rights, in particular on the ECHR, published in Poland and abroad. He is also a lecturer at Collegium Civitas in Warsaw.

== Awards ==
- Award of the Polcul Foundation for an exceptional contribution towards the development of the independent Polish culture, Australia (1984)
- Award of the Krzyzanowski Foundation for the promotion of human rights, USA (1992)
- Polish Bar Association medal "The Bar to Meritorious" (1995)
- Special Annual Award "Golden Paragraph" of the national daily "Gazeta Prawna" - for the promotion of human rights in writings, Poland (2008)
- Edward J. Wende Annual Award "Salus Rei Publicae Suprema Lex Esto", Poland (2009)
- Officer's Cross of the Order of Polonia Restituta (2009)
