= Battle of Siemiatycze =

- Part of the January Uprising
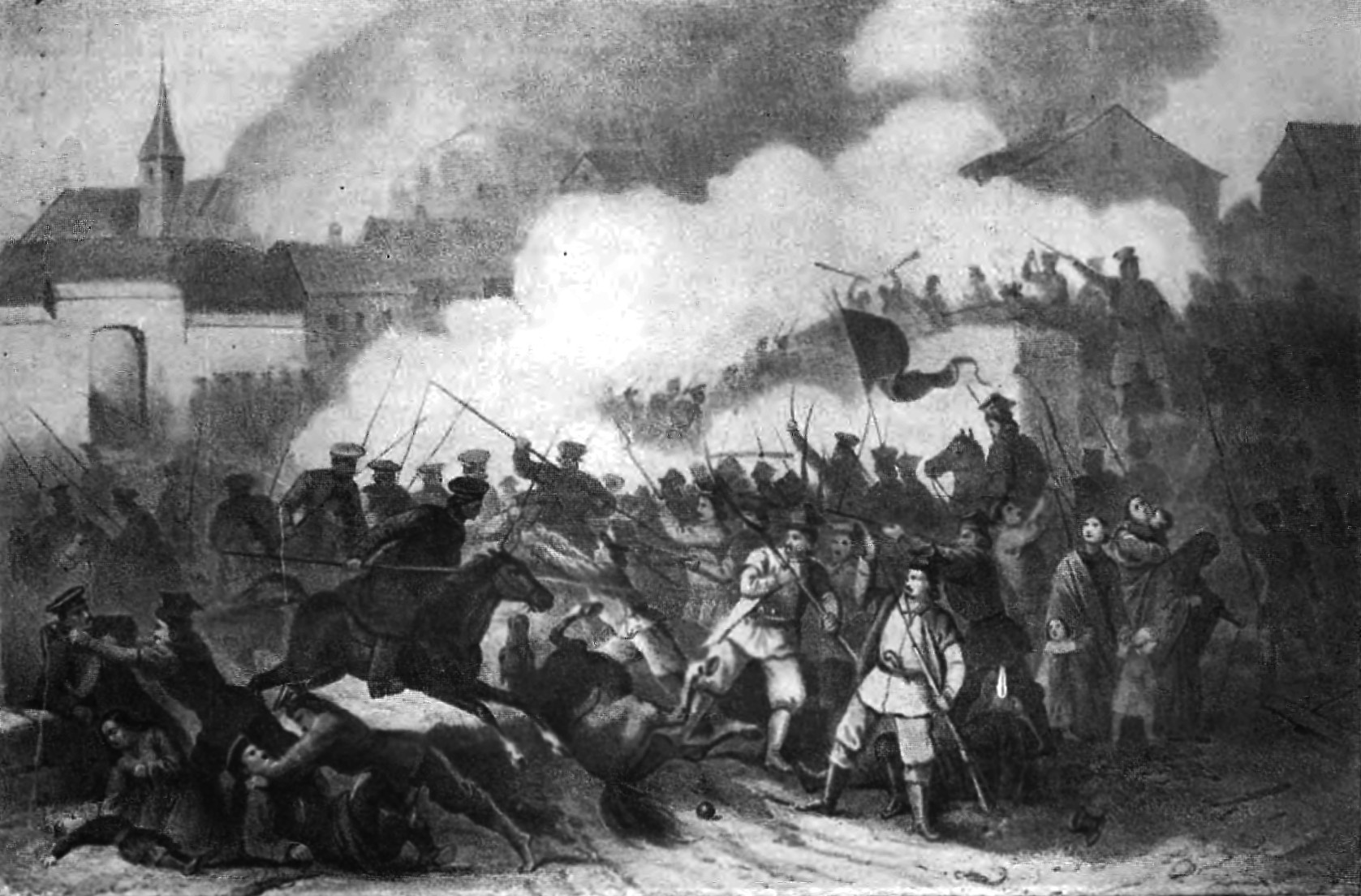
Date	6–7 February 1863
Location	Siemiatycze, Poland
Result	Russian victory

Belligerents
(Poland) Polish Insurgents	Russian Empire

Commanders and leaders
Aleksander Rogaliński	General Zachar Maniukin

Strength
4,000	2,500

The Battle of Siemiatycze was one of the largest battles of the January Uprising. It took place on February 6–7, 1863, in the town of Siemiatycze, Russian Empire (now Poland). Russian forces of some 2,500 under General Zachar Maniukin clashed with 4,000 Polish insurgents commanded by Walenty Lewandowski, Roman Roginski and Wladyslaw Cichorski-Zameczek. The battle was won by the Russians, and their victory had widespread implications in the area of Białystok, as the local population decided not to back the uprising.

Siemiatycze, located in the Grodno Governorate, was one of the centers of the Polish patriotic movement between the years of 1860 – 1862. For unknown reasons, in 1862 a Russian garrison was withdrawn from the town, which allowed the Polish conspirators to act freely. The insurgents held their meetings in the palace of Duchess Anna Jablonowska, which also served as a storage of weapons, uniforms and food. The uprising itself did not begin here on January 22, 1863, but a few days later, when news of it reached the town.

Due to the lack of a Russian garrison, insurgents from the whole area began to gather in Siemiatycze in early February. The first unit to arrive here was led by Wladyslaw Cichorski-Zameczek, and it had volunteers from the area of Łomża. Soon afterwards it was joined by a unit under Roman Roginski, which came from the nearby village of Biala Podlaska. Both units merged under the leadership of Walenty Lewandowski, the military commander (naczelnik) of the uprising in the region of Podlasie.

The battle lasted for two days, and began with a Russian cossack assault on Polish positions. Polish kosynierzy managed to stop the Cossacks, with heavy losses on both sides. On the next day, Russian reinforcements arrived with both infantry and cannon. The Polish insurgents, facing superior firepower and weapons of the enemy, decided there position to be untenable and retreated. They had to leave behind their sick and wounded in the Palace. The Cossacks entered Siemiatycze on February 7, burned the palace with the still living sick and wounded insurgents inside and sacked the town. The insurgents fled either to Congress Poland, or Bialowieza Forest.

Altogether some 200 Poles were killed in the battle, with untold number burned alive- while Russians lost some 70 soldiers. Siemiatycze, with its mostly wooden houses, was completely burned, and its residents had to flee to the nearby forests. Consequences of the Polish defeat were widespread, as the uprising lost its momentum in the region of Podlasie, and failed to attract local masses.

== Sources ==
- Jan Buraczynski, Roztocze. Dzieje osadnictwa, Lublin 2008, s. 346–347, ISBN 978-83-60594-20-9.
- Stefan Kieniewicz: Powstanie styczniowe. Warszawa: Państwowe Wydawnictwo Naukowe, 1983. ISBN 83-01-03652-4.
