= Siemiatycze =

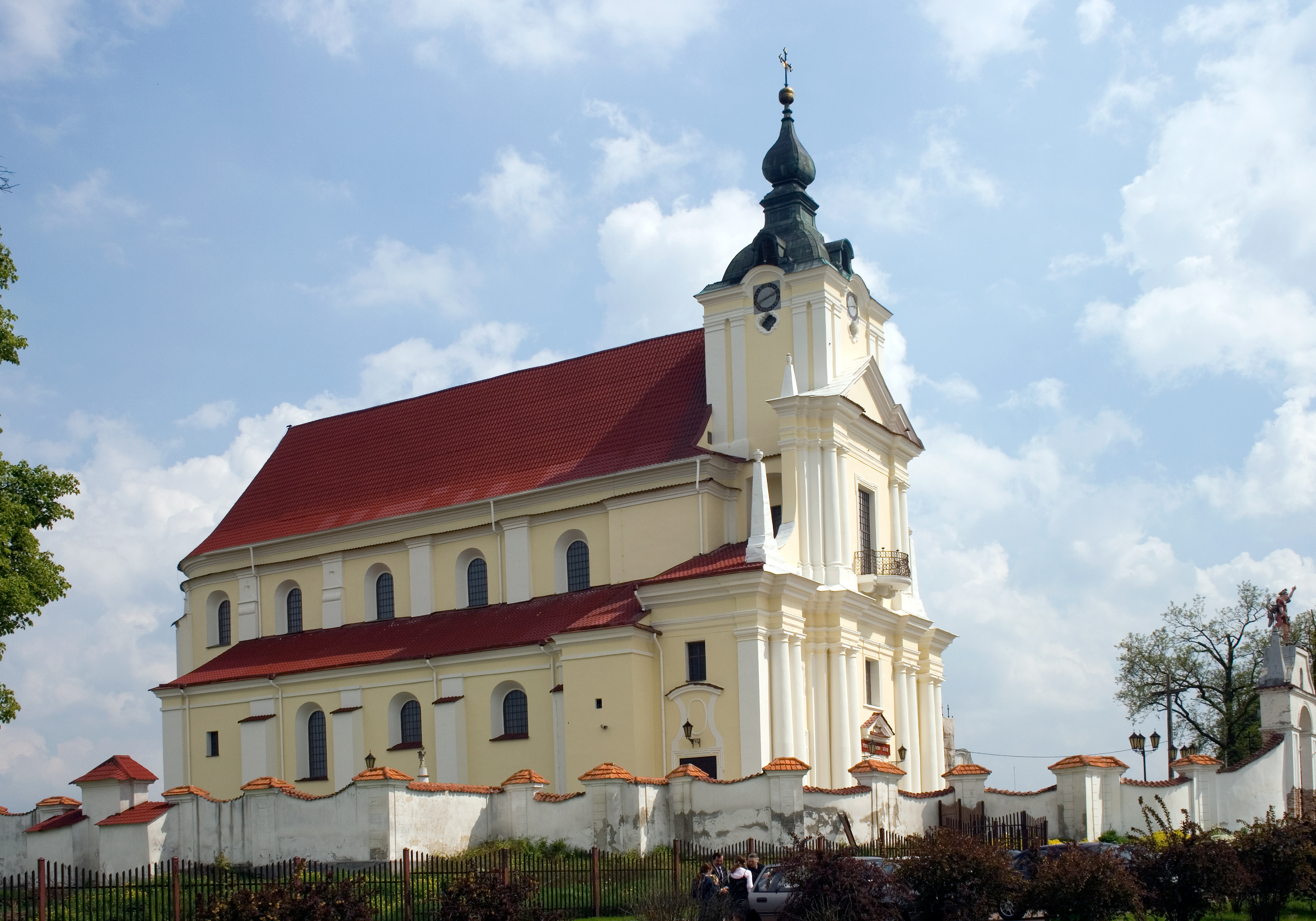
- Ascension of the Virgin Mary Church

- Flag Coat of arms

- Location within Poland
- Coordinates: 52°25′38″N 22°51′45″E
- Country: Poland
- Voivodeship: Podlaskie
- County: Siemiatycze
- Gmina: Siemiatycze (urban gmina)
- Established: 15th century
- Town rights: 1542

Government
  - Mayor: Piotr Siniakowicz

Area
  - Total: 36.25 km^{2} (14.00 sq mi)

Population (2019)
  - Total: 14,391
  - Density: 397.0/km^{2} (1,028/sq mi)
- Time zone: UTC+1 (CET)
  - Summer (DST): UTC+2 (CEST)
- Postal code: 17-300
- Area code: +48 85
- Car plates: BSI
- Website: siemiatycze.eu

Siemiatycze (Note: Polish: [ɕɛmʲaˈtɨt͡ʂɛ]; Belarusian: Сямятычы Siamiatyčy) is a town in eastern Poland, with 14,391 inhabitants (2019). It is the capital of Siemiatycze County in the Podlaskie Voivodeship.

== History ==
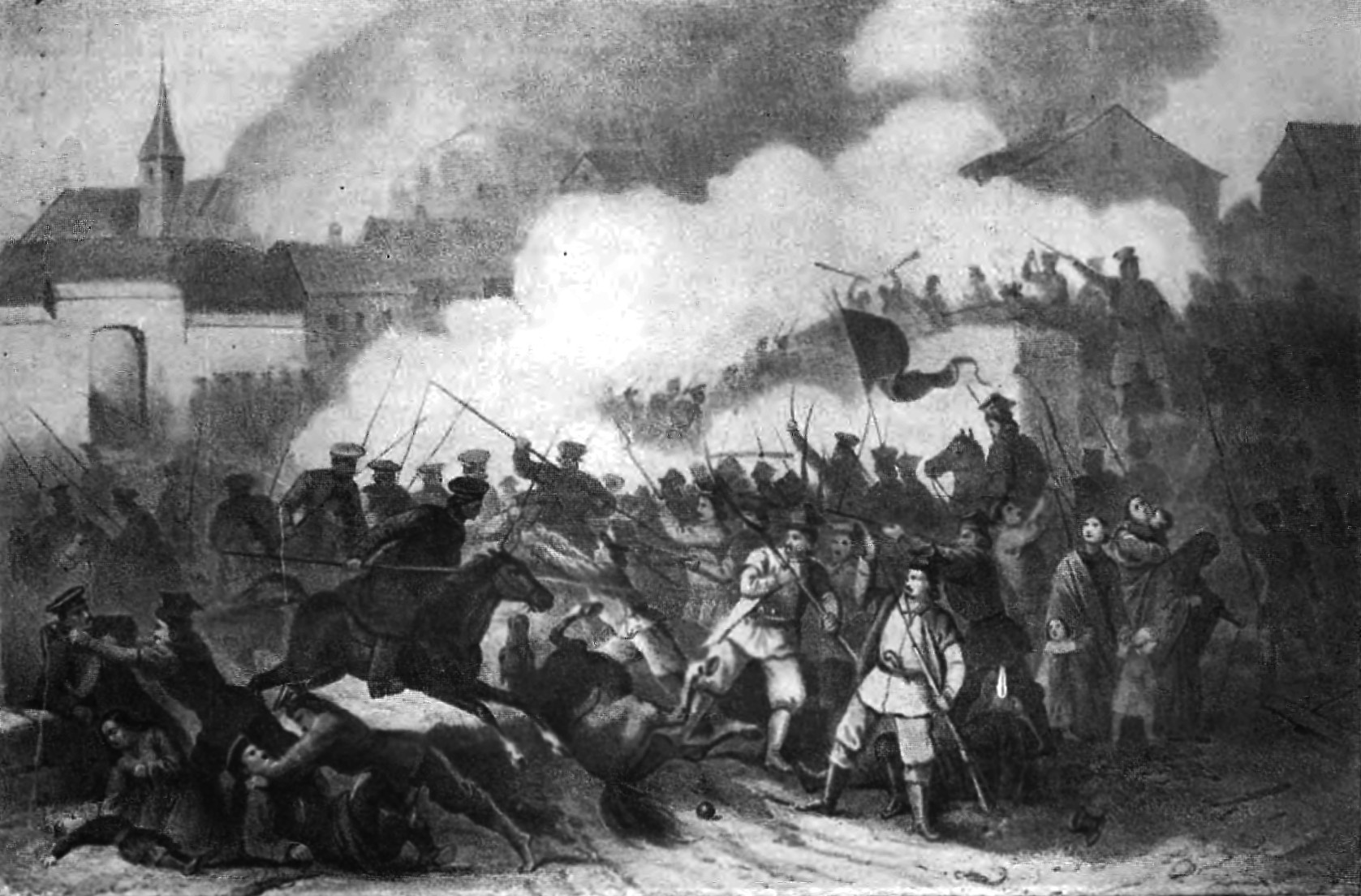
Battle of Siemiatycze, 6–7 February 1863

The history of Siemiatycze dates back to the mid-16th century, when the village was part of the Podlasie Voivodeship of the Grand Duchy of Lithuania. In 1542, King Sigismund II Augustus granted town charter to Siemiatycze, and with the 1569 Union of Lublin, it passed to the Kingdom of Poland within the Polish–Lithuanian Commonwealth.

For centuries Siemiatycze remained property of several Polish-Lithuanian magnate families. The town, conveniently located along the Bug River, and near local administrative centers at Drohiczyn and Mielnik, became a popular market place, where farmers sold their produce. The disastrous Swedish invasion of Poland (1655–60) did not bring widespread destruction to Siemiatycze. The town continued to prosper, at the expense of other municipalities of the region of Podlachia, some of which were burned to the ground by the Swedish, Transilvanian and Russian invaders.

In the 18th century, Siemiatycze was among the most developed towns of the region. At that time it belonged to the Sapieha family, which founded the town hall, synagogue and other buildings. Noblewoman Anna Jabłonowska founded a midwifery institute, hospital, monastery, palace with a museum and a new printing house. She also obtained a permission from the kings of Poland for the town to hold two annual fairs. In 1807 Siemiatycze was annexed by the Russian Empire, and during the January Uprising, the Battle of Siemiatycze took place here, after which most of the town was destroyed, together with the Jabłonowski Palace, which has never been rebuilt. Following World War I, Poland regained independence and control of the town.

During the joint German-Soviet invasion of Poland, which started World War II in September 1939, Siemiatycze was invaded by Germany, which then handed it over to the Soviets in accordance with the Molotov–Ribbentrop Pact. The Soviets carried out arrests of prominent local Poles, including the town's mayor. The Soviet Union occupied the town until 1941, and afterwards it was occupied by Germany until 1944. Siemiatycze was to a large extent destroyed during the war, and its significant Jewish community was almost completely exterminated by the Nazis in the Holocaust, although a few Jews survived by paying their neighbors to hide them. After the war, the population of the town shrank to 4,000. In 1948 the remains of 70 Jews executed by the Germans was exhumed and were buried at the local Jewish cemetery.

on June 21, 1941, the very eve of the Nazi invasion, in the Soviet-Polish border town of Siemiatycze, there was a ball attended by members of the German border patrol and many Jews from the town. At 4 A.M., with the ball still in progress, Luftwaffe bombs began to fall. Unknown to the Jews of Siemiatycze, or to the Jews of Nazi-occupied Europe, the Holocaust had begun.

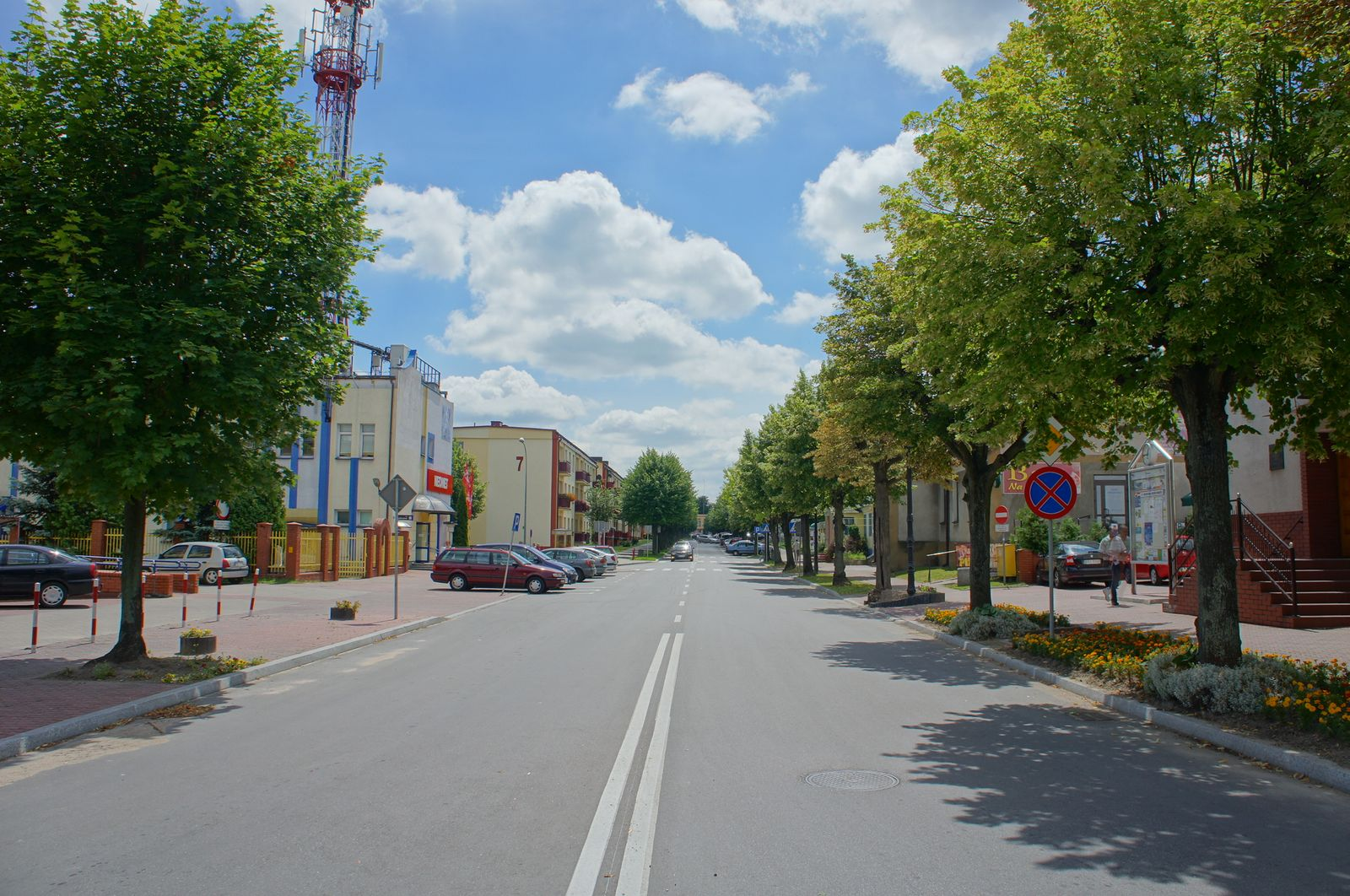
A view of Pałacowa Street in Siemiatycze

From 1975 to 1998, it was administratively located in the Białystok Voivodeship.

== Sports ==
The local football club is Cresovia Siemiatycze. It competes in the lower leagues.

== Notable people ==
- Dariusz Ludwig (born 1955), decathlete
- Jan Masiel (born 1963), politician, MEP
- Marek Antoni Nowicki (born 1953), human rights lawyer
- Barbara Okuła (born 1973), politician, entrepreneur, member of the Polish Sejm
- Robert Podoliński (born 1975), footballer, manager, commentator, pundit
- Krzysztof Tołwiński (born 1968), politician

== International relations ==
=== Twin towns — Sister cities ===
Siemiatycze is twinned with:

- Castrolibero, Italy
- Zehdenick, Germany
