= Church of St. Francis, Warsaw =

Church of the Stigmata of St. Francis
- Kościół pw. Stygmatów św. Franciszka
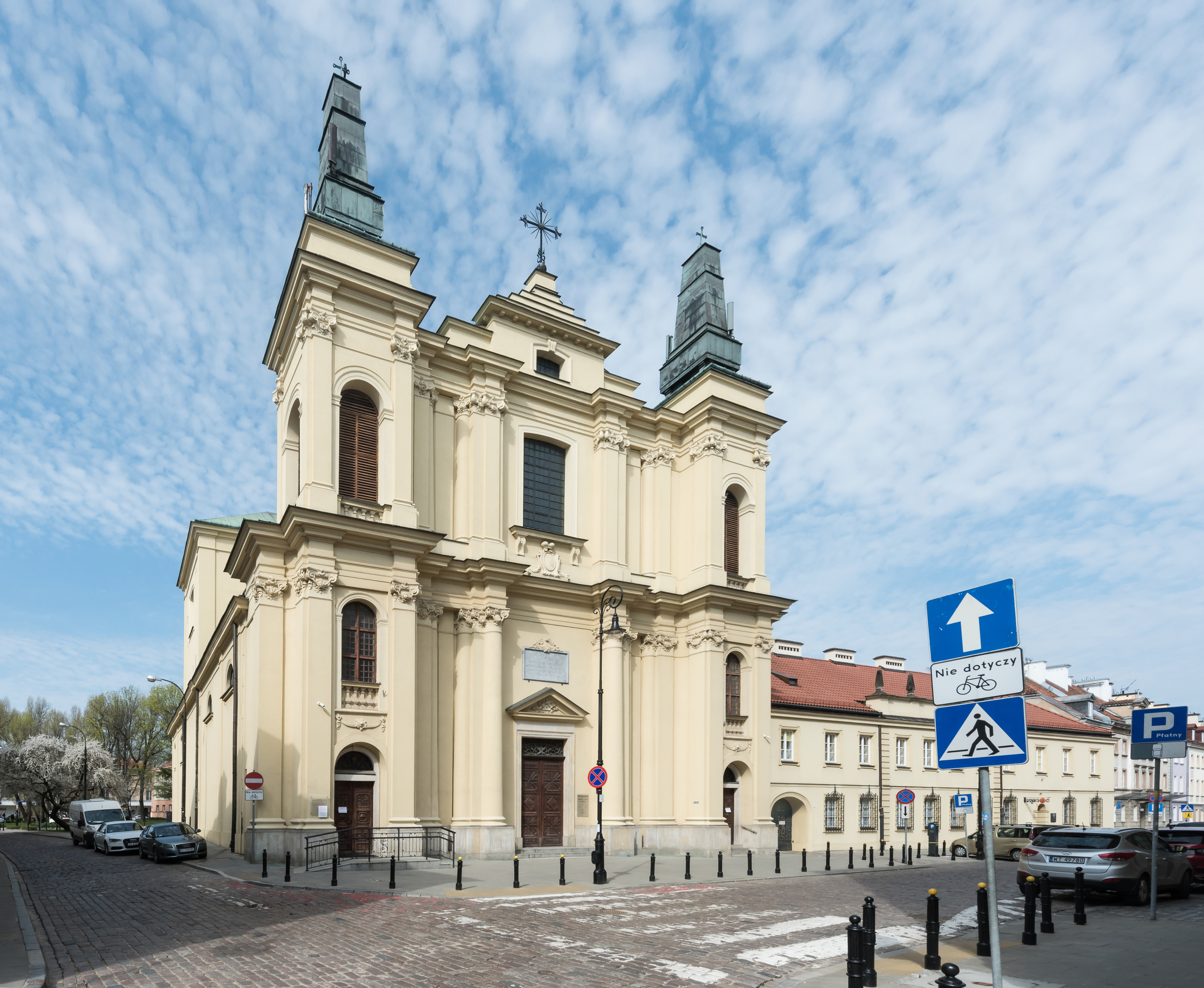
- Facade of the Church of St. Francis in Warsaw
- Church of the Stigmata of St. Francis
- 52°15′13″N 21°0′24″E
- Location: Warsaw
- Country: Poland
- Denomination: Roman Catholic
- Website: http://www.warszawa.franciszkanie-warszawa.pl/

History
- Founded: 6 November 1645
- Dedication: Francis of Assisi

Architecture
- Architect(s): Giovanni Battista Ceroni; Jakub Fontana

Historic Monument of Poland
- Designated: 1994-09-08
- Part of: Warsaw – historic city center with the Royal Route and Wilanów
- Reference no.: M.P. 1994 nr 50 poz. 423

The Church of the Stigmata of St. Francis (Polish: Kościół pw. Stygmatów św. Franciszka) is a church adjoining Franciscan convent in Warsaw's New Town.

== History ==
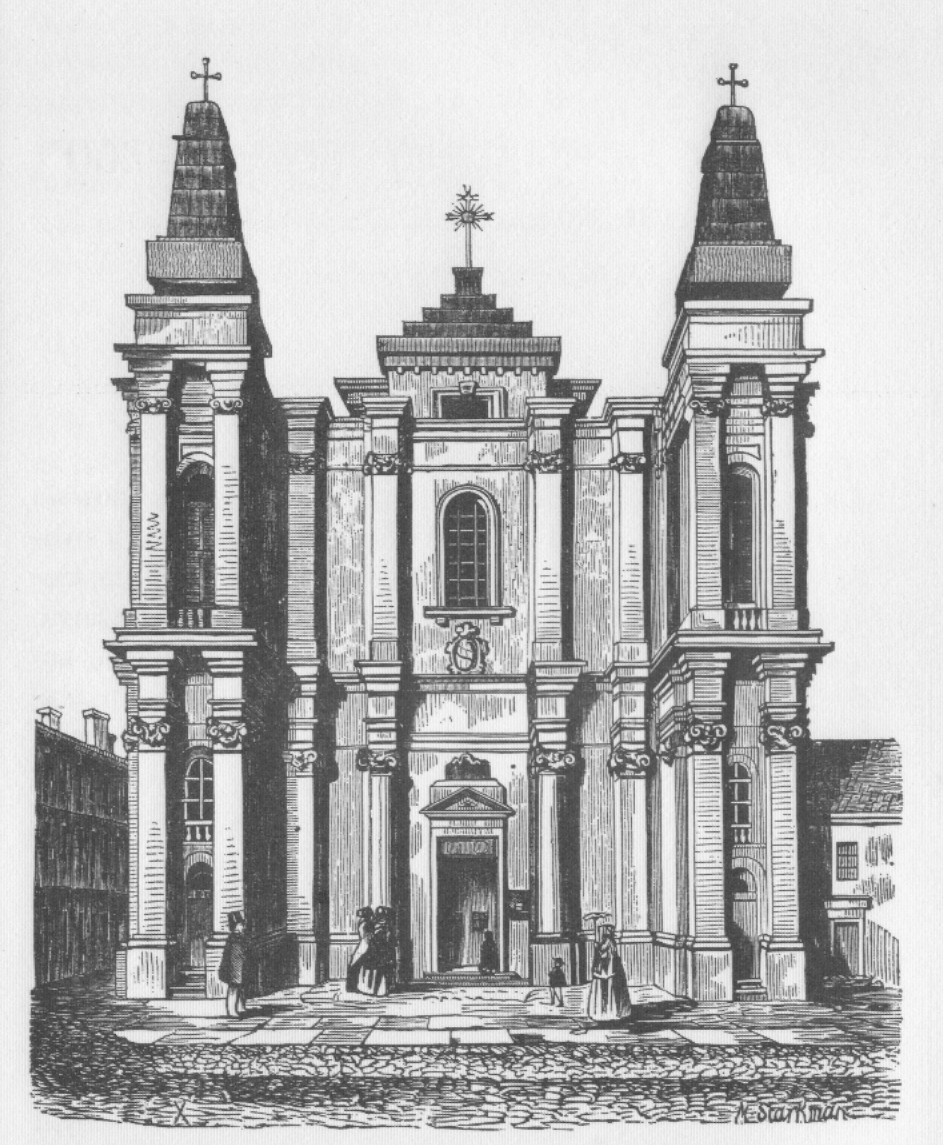
Woodcut of the church by Michał Starkman (c. 1855)

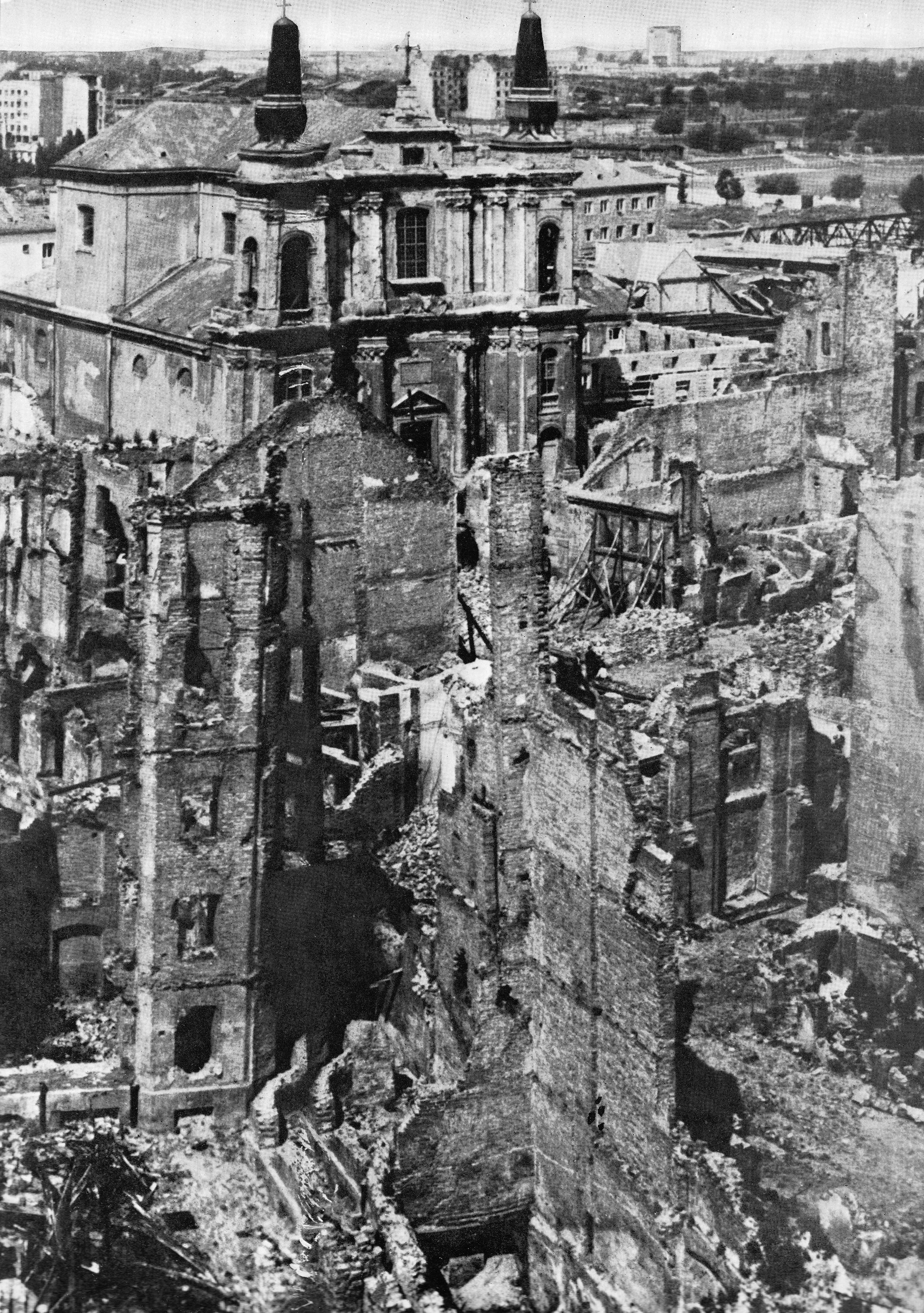
Church among the ruins of the Warsaw New Town (1945)

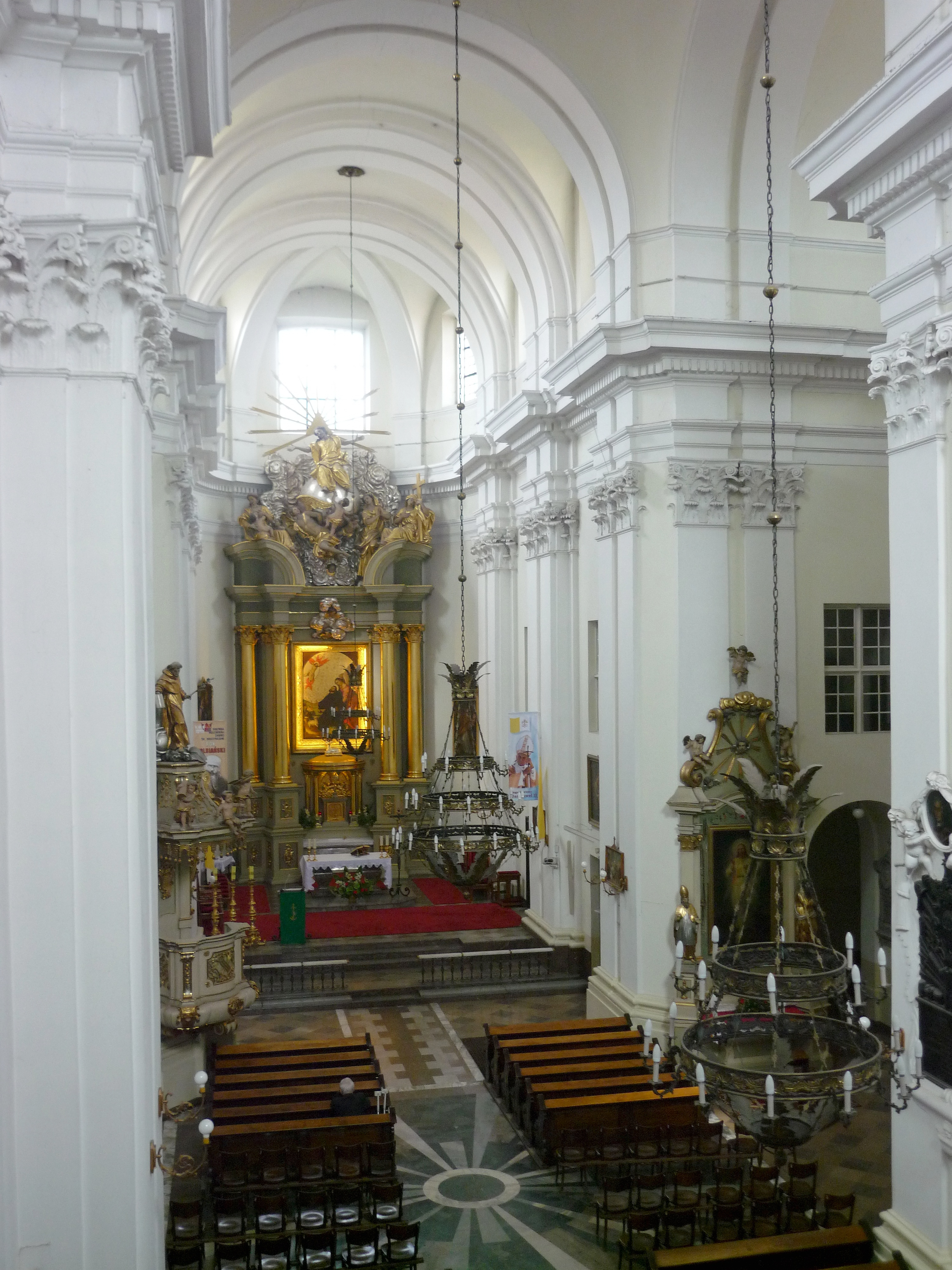
The interior of the church (2011)

In comparison with other Polish cities, the Franciscans arrived relatively late in Warsaw, in 1646. They arrived thanks to King Władysław IV Vasa's chaplain - Italian Franciscan, Vincent Skapita. A royal secretary Jakub Sosnowski donated the square while the politician Zygmunt Wybranowski offered some financial funds. These two decided to build a church and a Franciscan monastery in Warsaw. The king agreed to this on 6 November 1645, and the Bishop of Poznan Andrzej Szołdrski issued a canonical license on 16 April 1646.

The small property was located at the corner of Przyrynek and Wójtowski and in the same year the monks traded the land for its present location nearby at Zakroczymska. In 1646 a small wooden church was built with two chapels dedicated to the Virgin Mary and St. Anthony, and the first superior of the monastery was Father Vincent Skapita. The General Order Catallani established the monastery in 1648, with higher education for the young religious students.

A Warsaw merchant, David Mincer, donated a square in the (current) Warsaw district of Wola, with the king's privileges (1647). The second wooden church was burned during the Swedish invasion, then reconstructed from 1662 to 1663.

In July 1679 a foundation stone for the construction of a new church was laid. According to the first draft by Giovanni Battista Ceroni from 1679 to 1691 only the presbytery and the adjacent room were built - opposite the sacristy and chapel of Our Lady of Consolation. In 1700 they managed to lay the foundation for main aisle, but the death of Ceroni in 1708 interrupted a work for a couple of years.

The construction resumed in 1713. Ceroni's project was slightly modified by Karol Bay, including the introduction of diagonal columns in the corners spanning the aisles. Construction management was entrusted to Józef Fontana and his son, Jakub. In 1737 the church, dedicated to St. Francis of Assisi, was consecrated by the bishop Stanislaus Hosius, the bishop of Poznan. There came a period of varied pastoral and cultural Franciscan activities in the capital of Poland.

Later, from 1744 to 1745, Jakub Fontana designed the ornate rococo fence for the cemetery of the Church, which was demolished in 1818. From 1746 to 1749, the west chapel dedicated to the Holy Trinity was built (designed by Antonio Solari), and in 1788 Giuseppe Boretti reconstructed the facade.

From the beginning of the 19th century, the Monastery passed vicissitudes (among other things it housed a prison, an orphanage and also a Warsaw Clerical Academy). After the fall of January Uprising in 1864 the monastery was closed. Then it was associated with the transformation of the church into a place of worship for Catholics serving in the Russian army. In the location of convent the Tsar placed an orphanage for children. The Franciscans regained their church and part of the buildings after the First World War.

From November 1940 to December 1941, the church was located at the northeastern end of the Warsaw Ghetto.

After the outbreak of the Warsaw Uprising the church was bombed (30 August), and 40 people which housed a shelter there were killed. There survived side walls and the altar of St. Anthony while the pulpit, partially destroyed, was reconstructed from the remains. In addition, there survived many elements of Baroque architecture, epitaphs, organs, side altars, confessionals and paintings from the 17th and 19th. 21 January 1945 there was celebrated a first thanksgiving mass in post-war, destroyed city. The renovation and retrofitting of the church lasted for many post-war years.

== Interior ==
The Franciscan church, like most churches in Warsaw, was damaged during the World War II, however many valuable objects were preserved. A number of leading artists in the 17th and 18th centuries contributed including sculptors Andreas Schlüter and Bartłomiej Bernatowicz (who had his studio in the New Town) and a painter Claude Callot - nephew of French artist Jacques Callot.

The choir has one of the best paintings of the Silesian painter Michael Willmann, transferred from the Lubiąż Abbey - Christ in Gethsemane (Chrystus w Ogrójcu - 1661).

=== The altars ===
- The main altar - made in 1724 by Bartłomiej Bernatowicz's workshop. Destroyed in the bombing in 1944, was carefully recreated from 1973 to 1983 according to plans by Stanislaw Marzyński, using parts of the columns of the old altar. In the middle there is a painting Stygmatyzacja św. Franciszka made by Matthias Kargena (17th century).
- The altars in the arms of the transept:
  - right - the altar of St. Anthony, by Bartłomiej Bernatowicz's workshop, with a painting Św. Antoni i cud z klękającym osłem by Matthias Kargena (17th century).
  - left - the altar of the Holy Cross. In the middle there is a sculpture group consisting of a crucifix attributed to Andreas Schlüter (a similar crucifix is located in a church in Węgrów), and originally composed of two groups of John and Mary, referring to an image by Jerzy Siemiginowski-Eleuter destroyed in the Holy Cross Church.
- The altars in the aisles:
  - in the first span (from the sanctuary):
    - left - rococo from the mid-18th century, with a painting of Św. Józef z Dzieciątkiem, attributed to Claude Callot.
    - right - early Baroque altar (around 1657), probably the oldest in the church, originally with the miraculous image of Our Lady of Consolation. Nowadays it holds a Baroque painting Last Supper (author unknown) from the inception of the altar and the Small Holy Family from the first half of the 18th century.
  - In the second span:
    - altar of 4 quarter of the 19th century with the image of Our Lady of Consolation (made before 1657), and eclectic from 1883.

In the chapel next to the sanctuary is a rococo altar from the third quarter of the 18th century, renovated in 1964, with a later placed painting of Maximilian Kolbe and the tabernacle of the first half of the 18th century. In the chapel are relics of St. Vitalis - martyr from the Roman period (embedded in the wax figure).

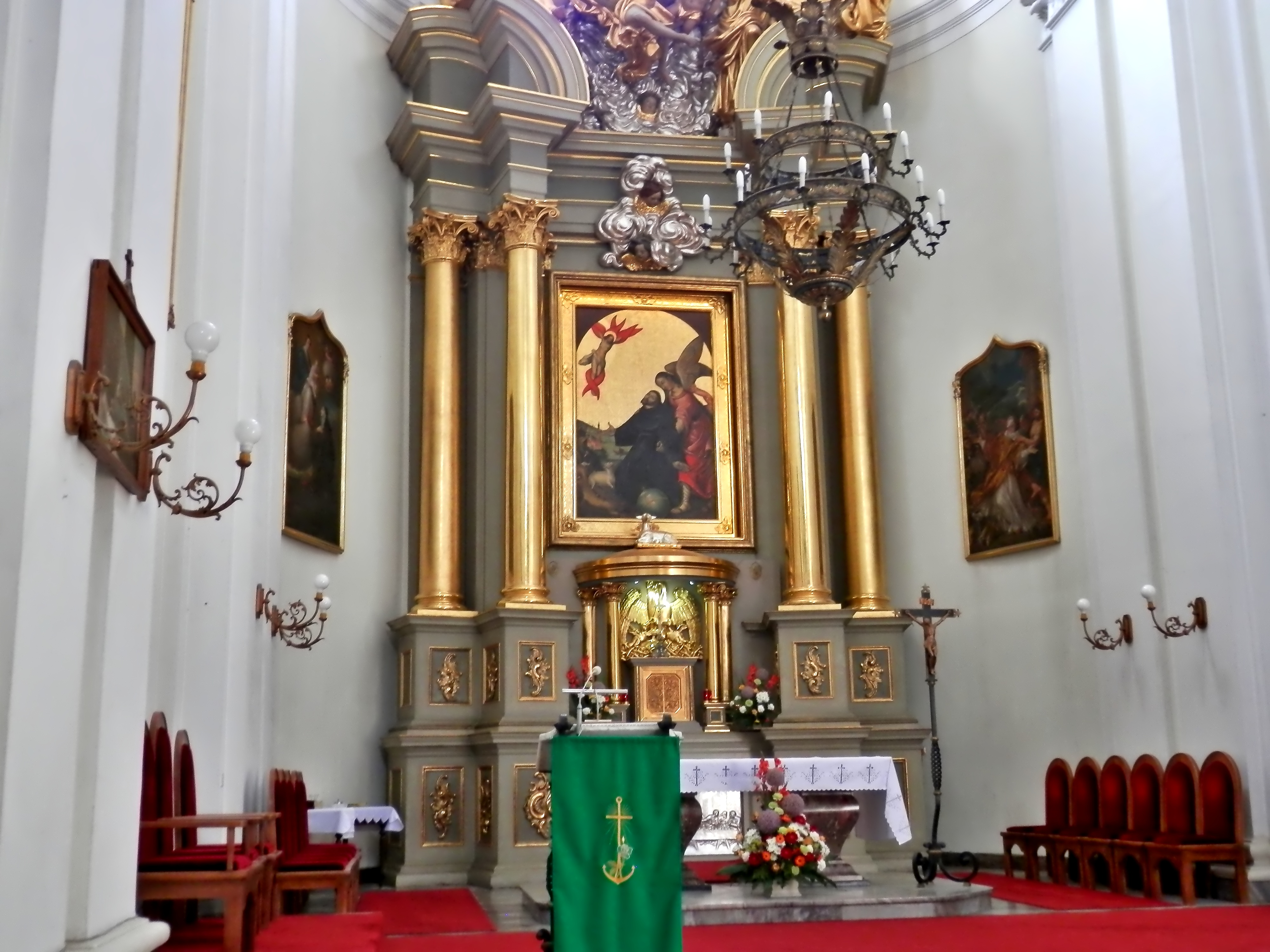
Main altar, dedicated to St. Francis (18th c.)

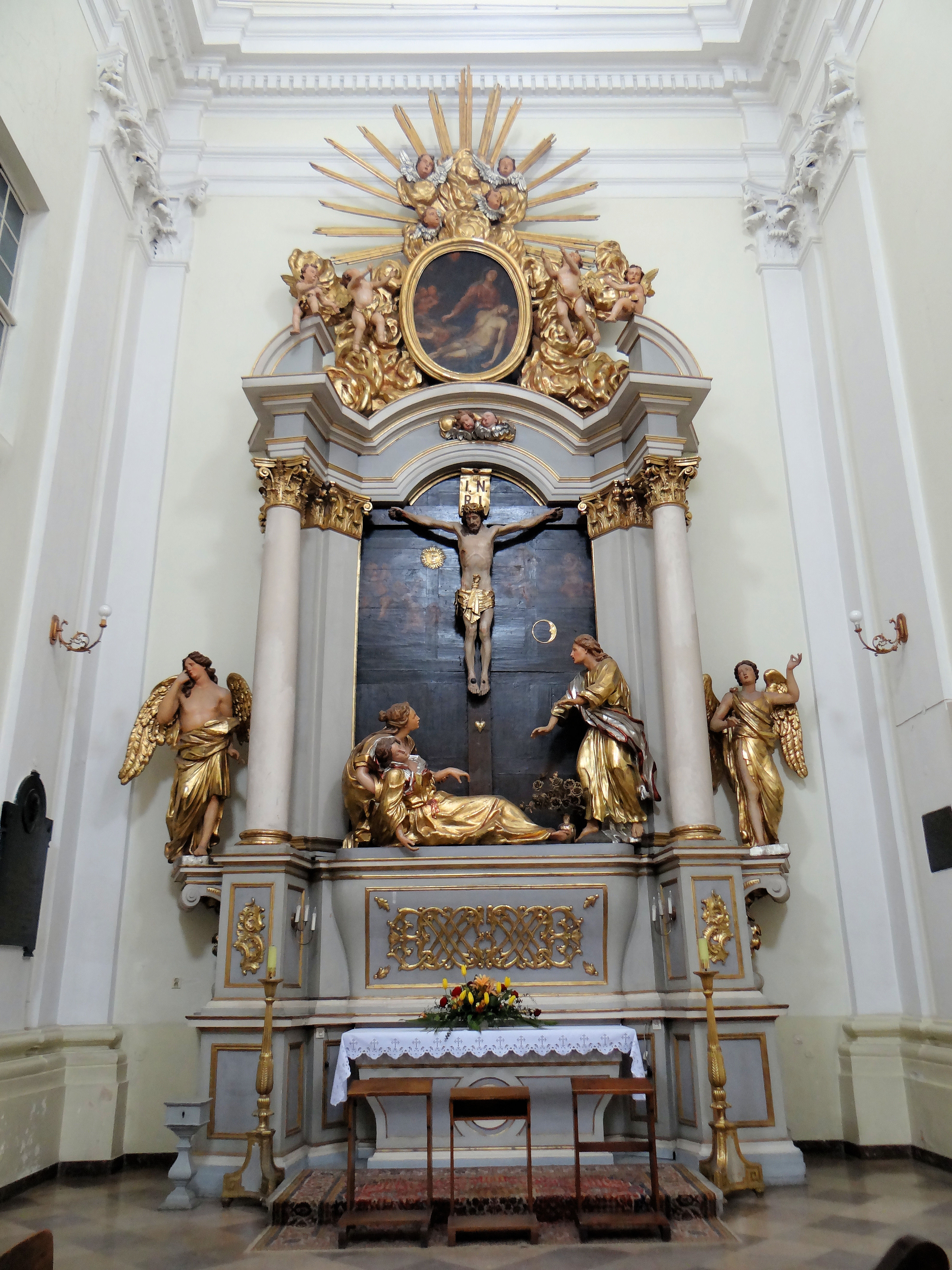
Altar of the Holy Cross (c. 1718-24)

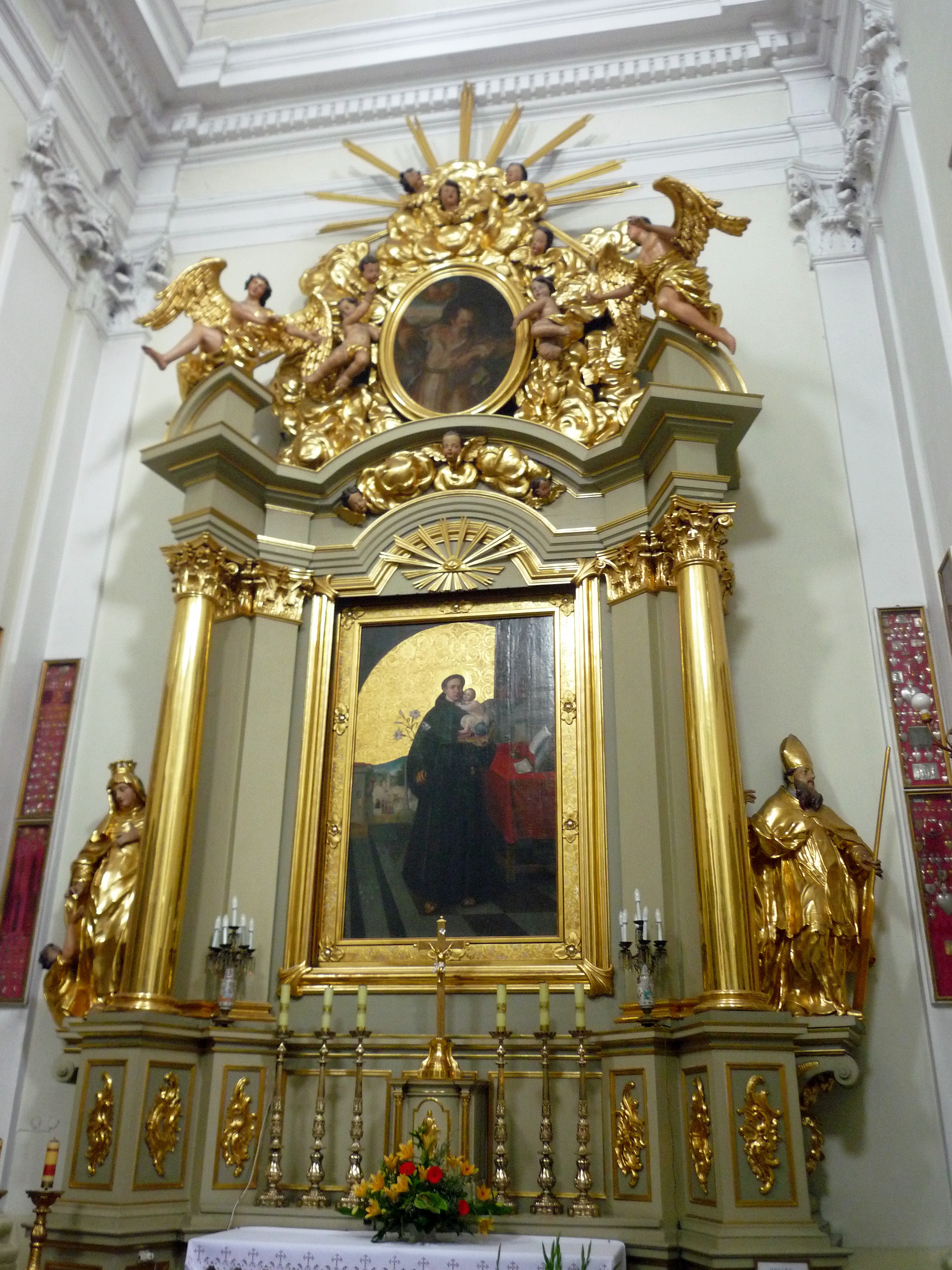
Side altar of St. Anthony of Padua (right aisle)

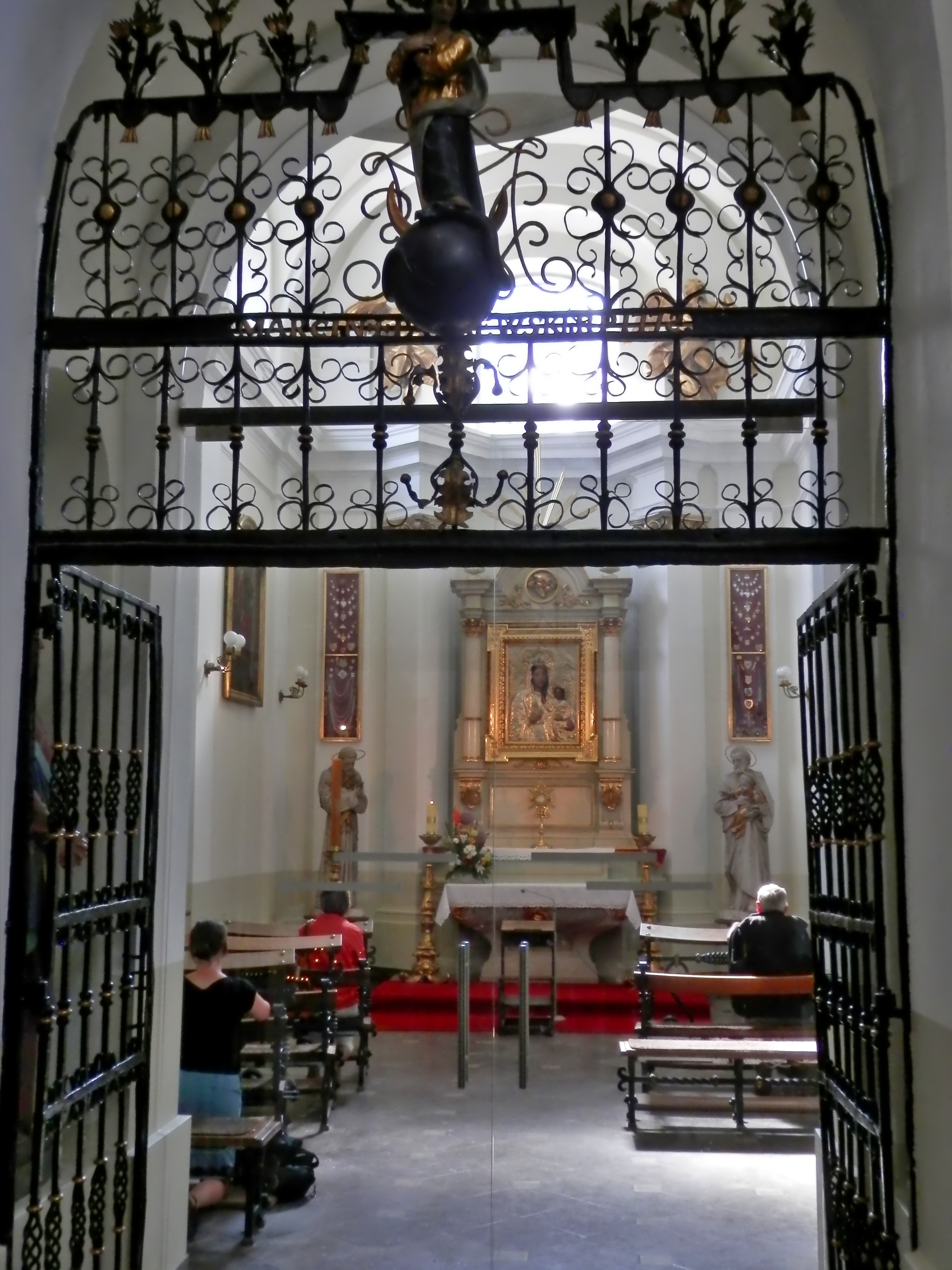
Our Lady of Consolation altar (left chapel)

=== Epitaphs ===
- Constantine Francis Mokronowski (d. 1733), the standard-bearer of land in Warsaw
- Ladislaus Grzegorzewski (d. 1758), Castellan Ciechanow, General royal guard 1736
- Father Anthony Kaczanowski (d. 1896)
- Henryk Perzyński (d. 1898),
- Sabina Wróblewska (d. 1904)

=== Organ ===
The current, 43-stop organ with tracker pneumatic was built by organ master Wenceslas Biernacki in 1925. It was funded by contributions from the faithful, and initiated by Father Florian Koziura. Prospectus, in the Baroque style, was designed by Enrico Marconi (designer of the organ in the Holy Cross Church in Krakowskie Przedmieście).
