= Trier =

City in Rhineland-Palatinate, Germany

Trier Tréier (Luxembourgish)
- City
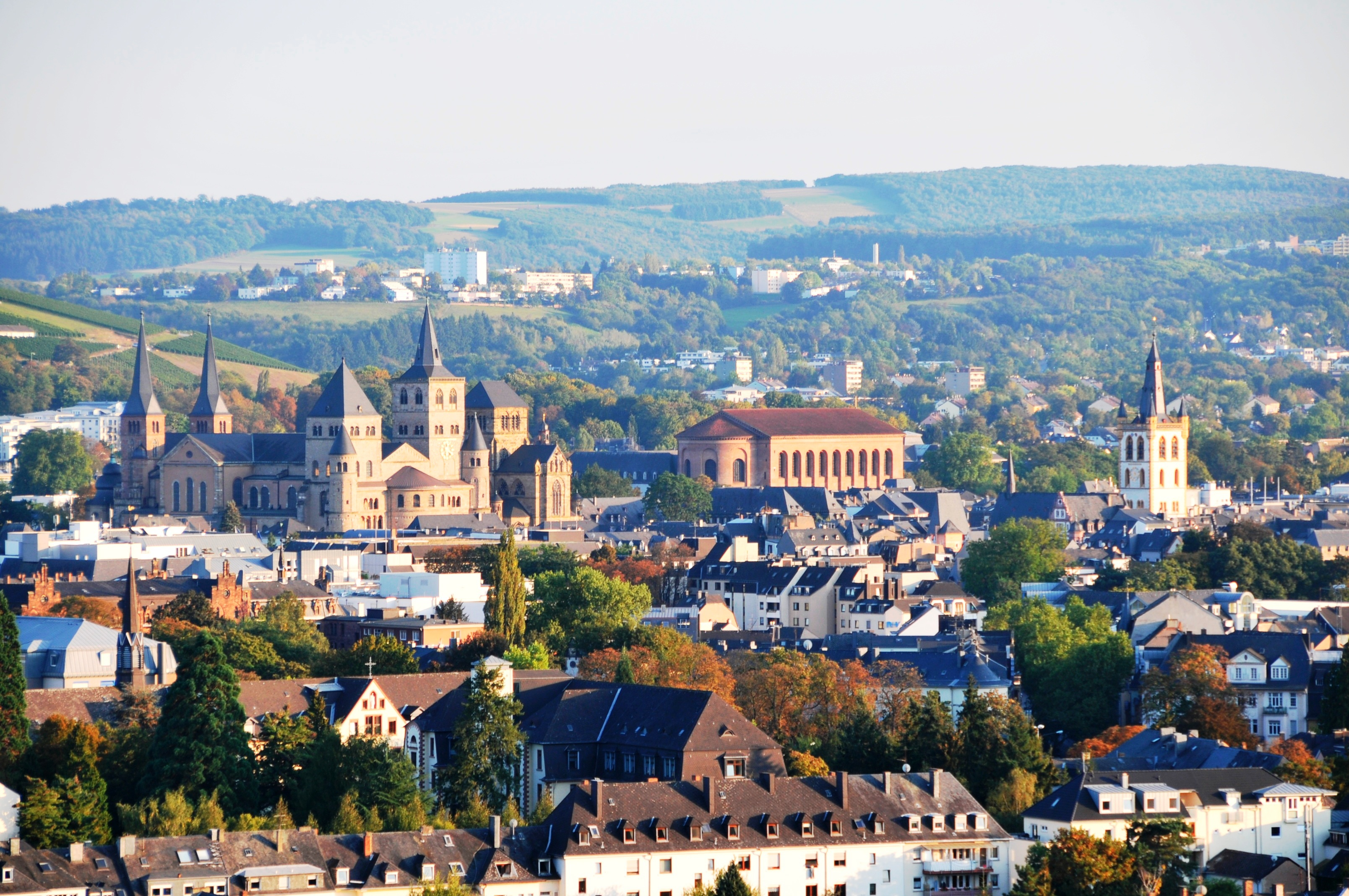
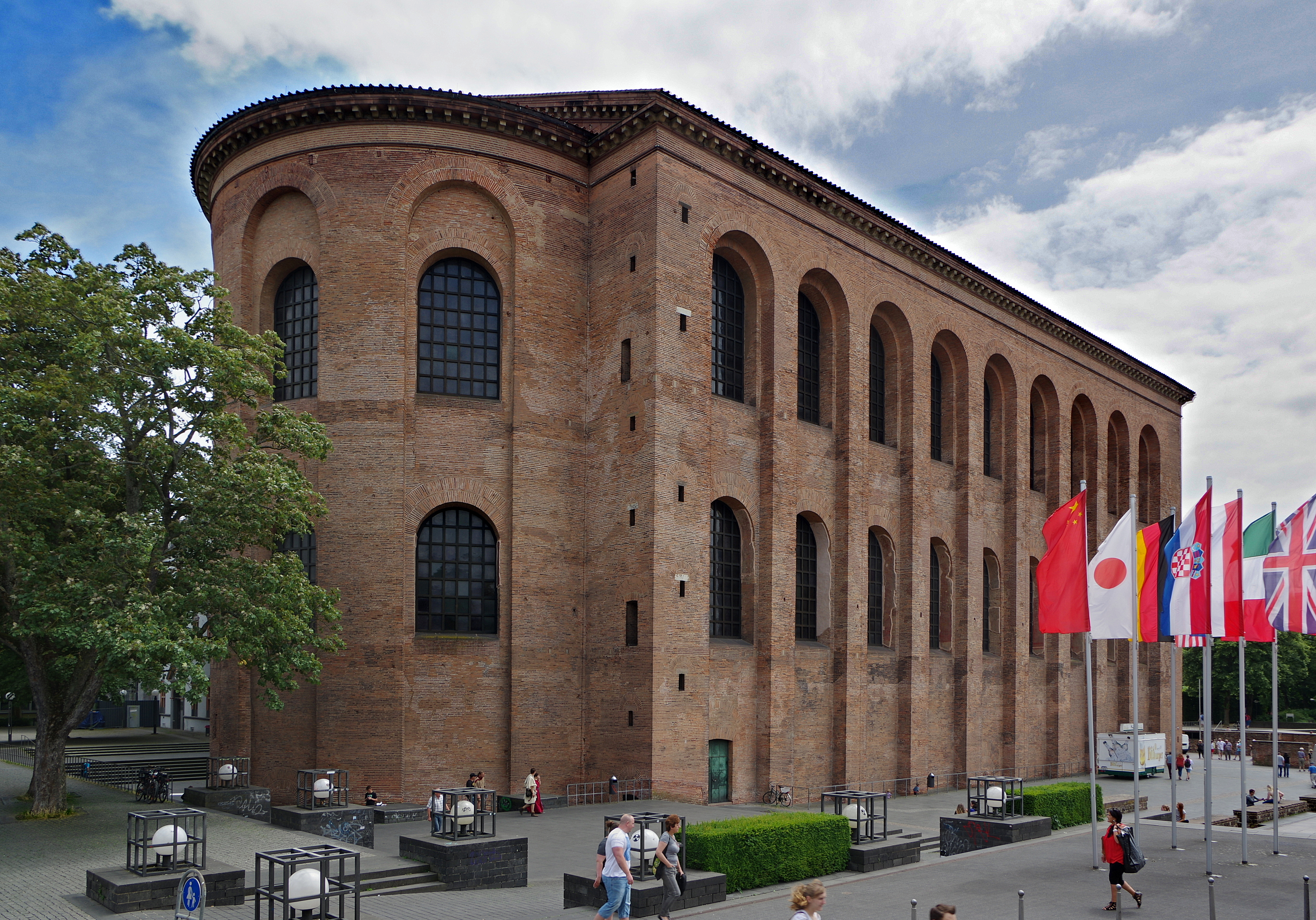
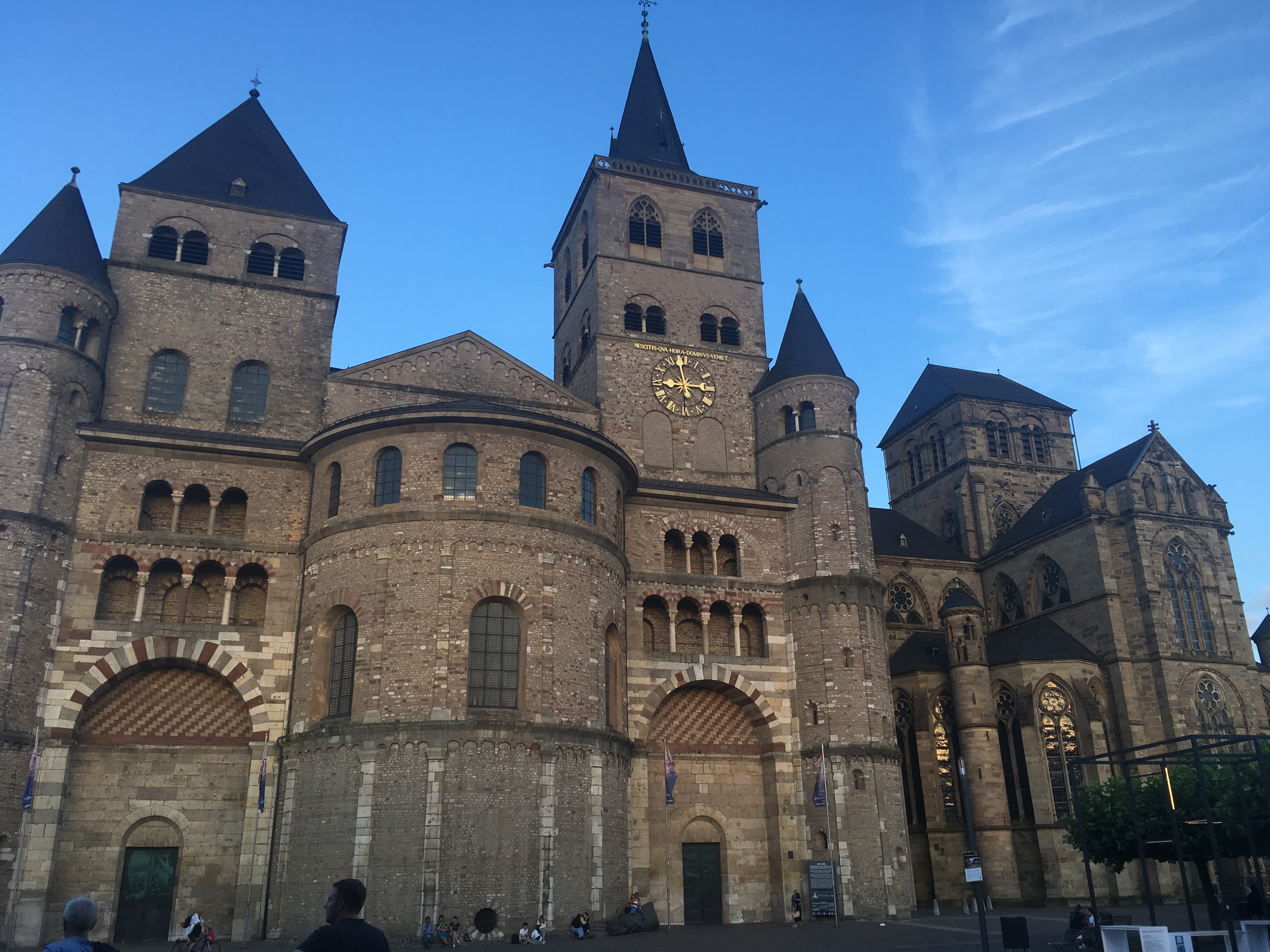
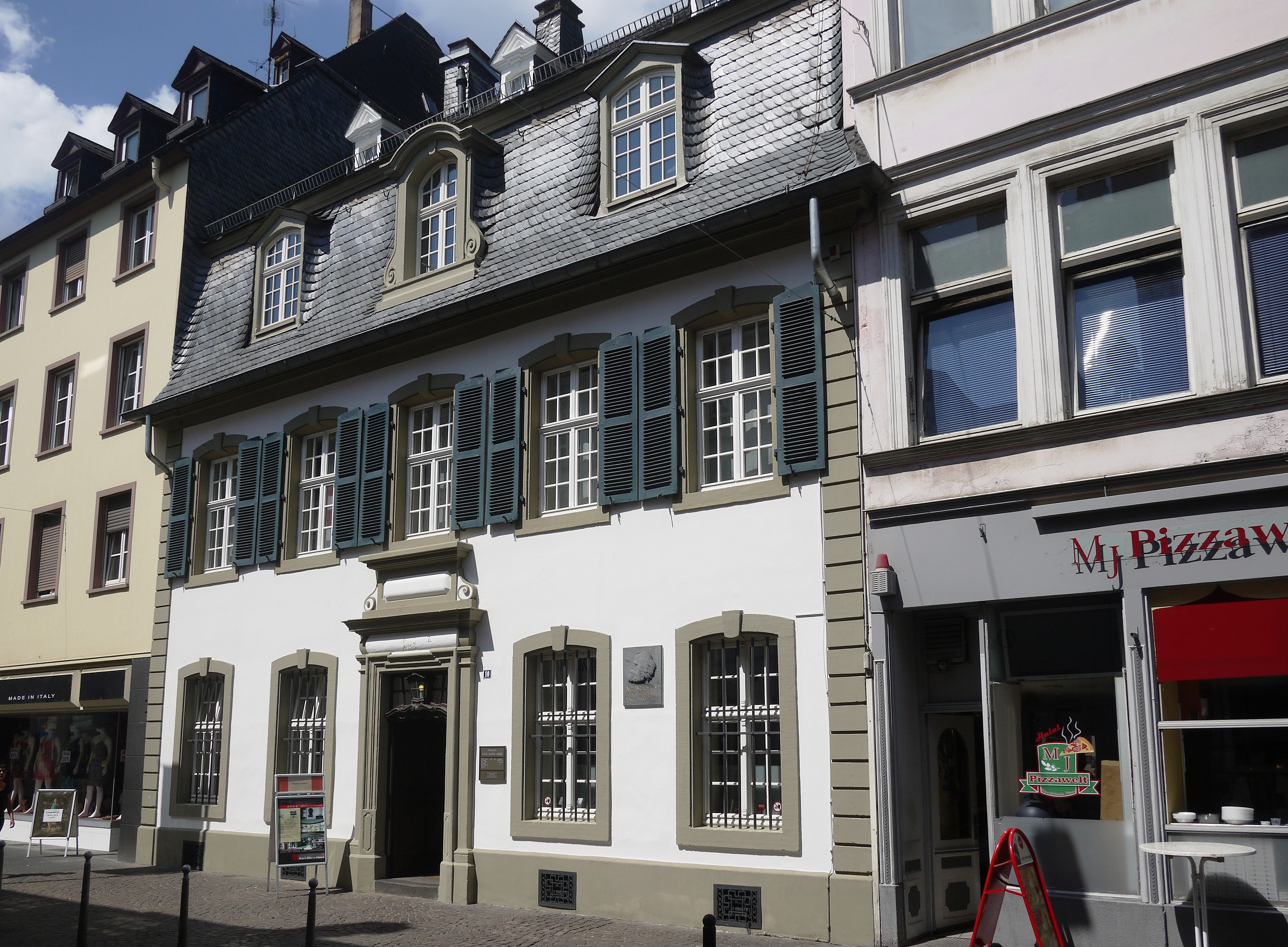
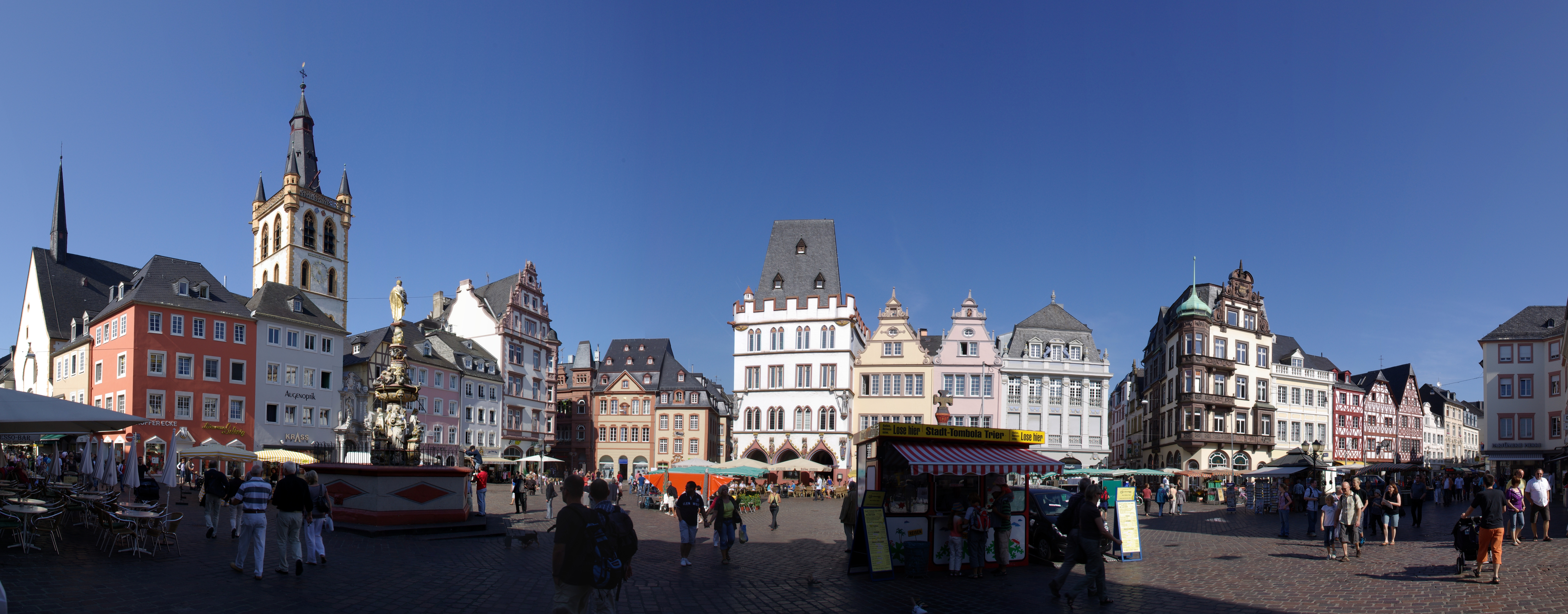
- Trier Skyline Porta Nigra Aula Palatina Trier Cathedral and Liebfrauenkirche Karl Marx House Trier Market Place

- Flag Coat of arms
- Interactive map of Trier
- Location within Germany Location within Rhineland-Palatinate
- Coordinates: 49°45′24″N 06°38′29″E
- Country: Germany
- State: Rhineland-Palatinate
- District: Urban district
- Founded: 17 BC

Government
  - Mayor (2023–2031): Wolfram Leibe (SPD)

Area
  - Total: 117.06 km^{2} (45.20 sq mi)
- Elevation: 137 m (449 ft)

Population (2025-12-31)
  - Total: 105,054
  - Density: 897.44/km^{2} (2,324.4/sq mi)
- Demonym: Trevian
- Time zone: UTC+01:00 (CET)
  - Summer (DST): UTC+02:00 (CEST)
- Postal codes: 54290, 54292–54296
- Dialling codes: 0651
- Vehicle registration: TR
- Website: www.trier.de

Trier (/trɪər/ TREER; German: [tʁiːɐ̯]; Luxembourgish: Tréier [ˈtʀɜɪ̯ɐ]), formerly and traditionally known in English as Trèves (/trɛv/ TREV, French: [tʁɛv]) and Triers (see also names in other languages), is a city on the banks of the Moselle in Germany. It lies in a valley between low vine-covered hills of red sandstone in the west of the state of Rhineland-Palatinate, near the border with Luxembourg and within the Moselle wine region.

Founded by the Romans in the late 1st century BC as Augusta Treverorum ("The City of Augustus among the Treveri"), Trier is considered Germany's oldest city. (Note: An honor that is contested by Cologne, Kempten, and Worms.) It is also the oldest seat of a bishop north of the Alps. Trier was one of the four capitals of the Roman Empire during the Tetrarchy period in the late 3rd and early 4th centuries. In the Middle Ages, the archbishop-elector of Trier was an important prince of the Church who controlled land from the French border to the Rhine. The archbishop-elector of Trier also had great significance as one of the seven electors of the Holy Roman Empire. Because of its significance during the Roman and Holy Roman empires, several monuments and cathedrals within Trier are listed as a UNESCO World Heritage Site.

With an approximate population of 110,000, Trier is the fourth-largest city in its state, after Mainz, Ludwigshafen, and Koblenz. The nearest major cities are Luxembourg City (50 km or 31 mi to the southwest), Saarbrücken (80 kilometres or 50 miles southeast), and Koblenz (100 km or 62 mi northeast).

The University of Trier, the administration of the Trier-Saarburg district and the seat of the ADD (Aufsichts- und Dienstleistungsdirektion), which until 1999 was the borough authority of Trier, and the Academy of European Law (ERA) are all based in Trier. It is one of the five "central places" of the state of Rhineland-Palatinate. Along with Luxembourg, Metz and Saarbrücken, fellow constituent members of the QuattroPole union of cities, it is central to the greater region encompassing Saar-Lor-Lux (Saarland, Lorraine and Luxembourg), Rhineland-Palatinate, and Wallonia.

== History ==
The first traces of human settlement in the area of the city show evidence of linear pottery settlements dating from the early Neolithic period. Since the last pre-Christian centuries, members of the Celtic tribe of the Treveri settled in the area of today's Trier. The city of Trier derives its name from the later Latin locative in Trēverīs for earlier Augusta Treverorum. According to the Archbishops of Trier, in the Gesta Treverorum, the founder of the city of the Trevians is Trebeta. German historian Johannes Aventinus also credited Trebeta with building settlements at Metz, Mainz, Basel, Strasbourg, Speyer and Worms.

The historical record describes the Roman Empire subduing the Treveri in the 1st century BC and establishing Augusta Treverorum about 16 BC. The name distinguished it from the empire's many other cities honoring the first Roman emperor, Augustus. The city later became the capital of the province of Belgic Gaul; after the Diocletian Reforms, it became the capital of the prefecture of the Gauls, overseeing much of the Western Roman Empire. From 293 to 395, Trier was one of the residences of the Western Roman Emperor. In the 4th century, Trier was one of the largest cities in the Roman Empire, with a population around 75,000 and perhaps as much as 100,000. The Porta Nigra ("Black Gate") dates from this era. A residence of the Western Roman emperor, Roman Trier was the birthplace of Saint Ambrose. Sometime between 395 and 418, probably in 407 the Roman administration moved the staff of the Praetorian Prefecture from Trier to Arles. The city continued to be inhabited but was not as prosperous as before. However, it remained the seat of a governor and had state factories for the production of ballistae and armor and woolen uniforms for the troops, clothing for the civil service, and high-quality garments for the Court. Northern Gaul was held by the Romans along a line (līmes) from north of Cologne to the coast at Boulogne through what is today southern Belgium until 460. South of this line, Roman control was firm, as evidenced by the continuing operation of the imperial arms factory at Amiens.

The history of the relationship between the Copts in Egypt and the city of Trier goes back to the first half of the fourth century AD, specifically the year 336 AD, when Pope Athanasius I, the 20th Patriarch (328–373 AD), was exiled to this city by order of Emperor Constantine the Great (25 July 306 – 22 May 337 AD).

Pope Athanasius the Apostolic – born around 296 AD – spent his youth in clerical circles, namely in the episcopal residence in the city of Alexandria. This upbringing made him well-versed in the affairs of church administration, immersed in an atmosphere rich with the purely pastoral and educational concerns of the popes.

The Franks seized Trier from Roman administration in 459. In 870, it became part of Eastern Francia, which developed into the Holy Roman Empire. Relics of Saint Matthias brought to the city initiated widespread pilgrimages. The bishops of the city grew increasingly powerful and the Archbishopric of Trier was recognised as an electorate of the empire, one of the most powerful states of Germany. The University of Trier was founded in the city in 1473. In the 17th century, the Archbishops and Prince-Electors of Trier relocated their residence to Philippsburg Castle in Ehrenbreitstein, near Koblenz. A session of the Reichstag was held in Trier in 1512, during which the demarcation of the Imperial Circles was definitively established.

In the years from 1581 to 1593, the Trier witch trials were held. It was one of the four largest witch trials in Germany alongside the Fulda witch trials, the Würzburg witch trial, and the Bamberg witch trials, perhaps even the largest one in European history. The persecutions started in the diocese of Trier in 1581 and reached the city itself in 1587, where it was to lead to the death of about 368 people, and was as such perhaps the biggest mass execution in Europe in peacetime. This counts only those executed within the city itself. The exact number of people executed in all the witch hunts within the diocese has never been established; a total of 1,000 has been suggested but not confirmed.

In the 17th and 18th centuries, the French–Habsburg rivalry brought war to Trier. Spain and France fought over the city during the Thirty Years' War. The bishop was imprisoned by Spain and the Holy Roman Emperor for his support for France between 1635 and 1645. In later wars between the Empire and France, French troops occupied the city during the Nine Years' War, the War of the Spanish Succession, and the War of the Polish Succession. After conquering Trier again in 1794 during the French Revolutionary Wars, France annexed the city and the electoral archbishopric was dissolved. After the Napoleonic Wars ended in 1815, Trier passed to the Kingdom of Prussia. Karl Marx, the German philosopher and one of the founders of Marxism, was born in the city in 1818.

As part of the Prussian Rhineland, Trier developed economically during the 19th century. The city rose in revolt during the revolutions of 1848 in the German states, although the rebels were forced to concede. It became part of the German Empire in 1871.

The synagogue on Zuckerbergstrasse was looted during the November 1938 Kristallnacht and later completely destroyed in a bomb attack in 1944. Multiple Stolpersteine have been installed in Trier to commemorate those murdered and exiled during the Shoah.

In June 1940, during World War II over 60,000 British prisoners of war, captured at Dunkirk and Northern France, were marched to Trier, which became a staging post for British soldiers headed for German prisoner-of-war camps. Trier was heavily bombed and bombarded in 1944. The city became part of the new state of Rhineland-Palatinate after the war. The university, dissolved in 1797, was restarted in the 1970s, and Trier Cathedral was reopened in 1974 after undergoing substantial and long-lasting renovations. Trier officially celebrated its 2,000th anniversary in 1984. On 1 December 2020, 5 people were killed by an allegedly drunk driver during a vehicle-ramming attack. The Ehrang/Quint district of Trier was heavily damaged and flooded during the 16 July 2021 floods of Germany, Belgium, The Netherlands and Luxembourg.

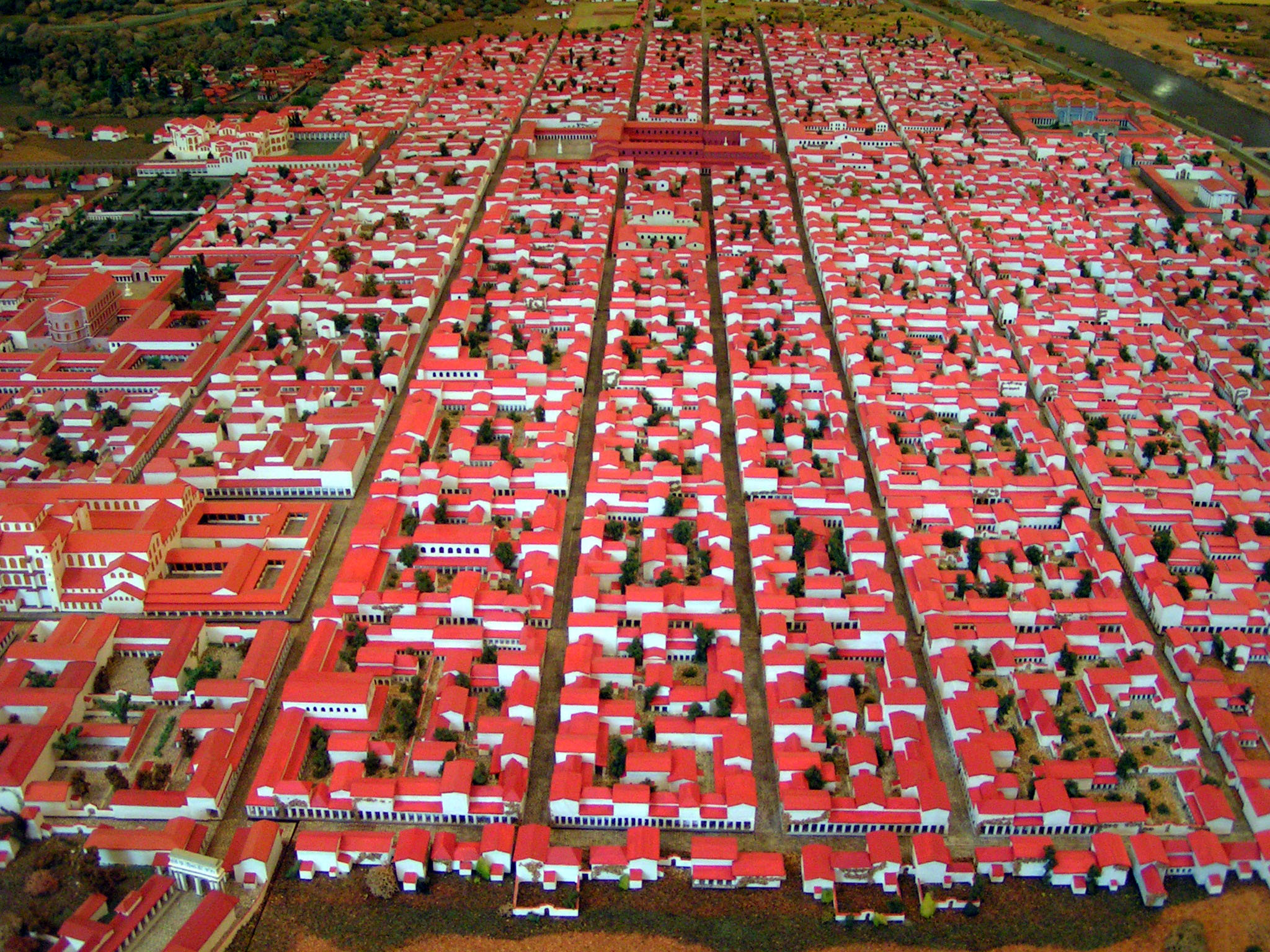
Augusta Treverorum in the 4th century. Model in the Rheinisches Landesmuseum Trier.

Porta Nigra

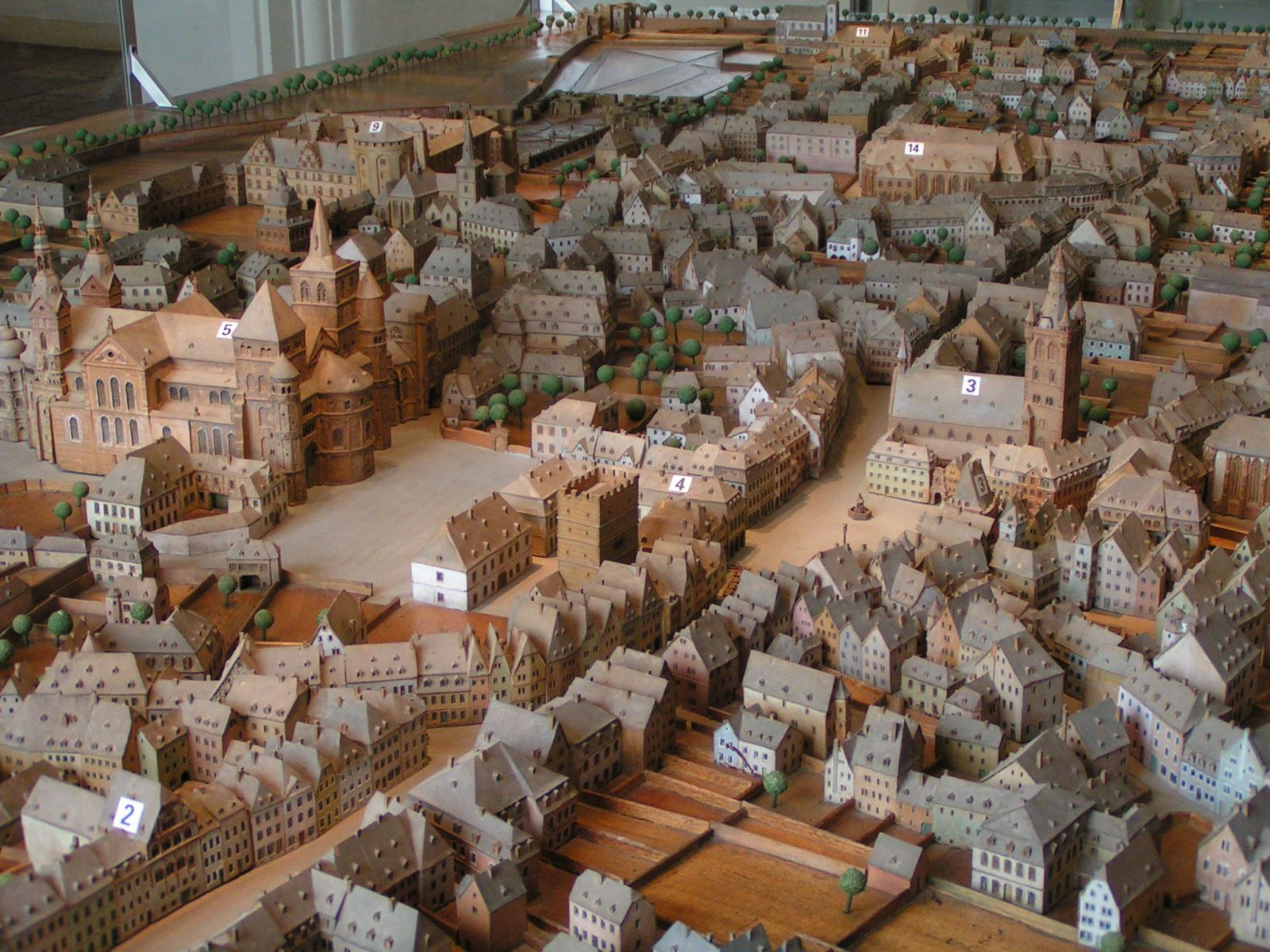
Scale model of Trier around 1800

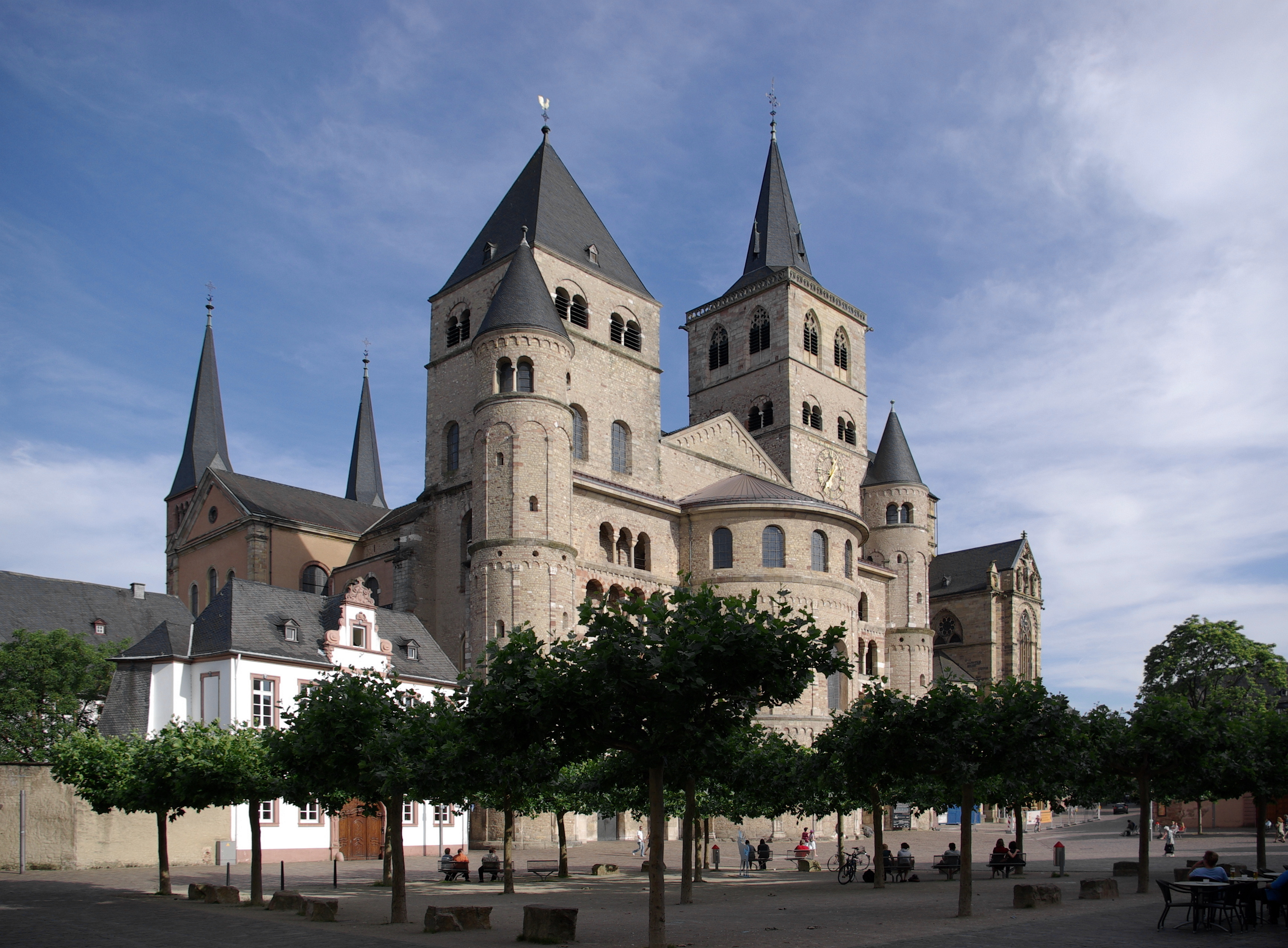
Trier Cathedral

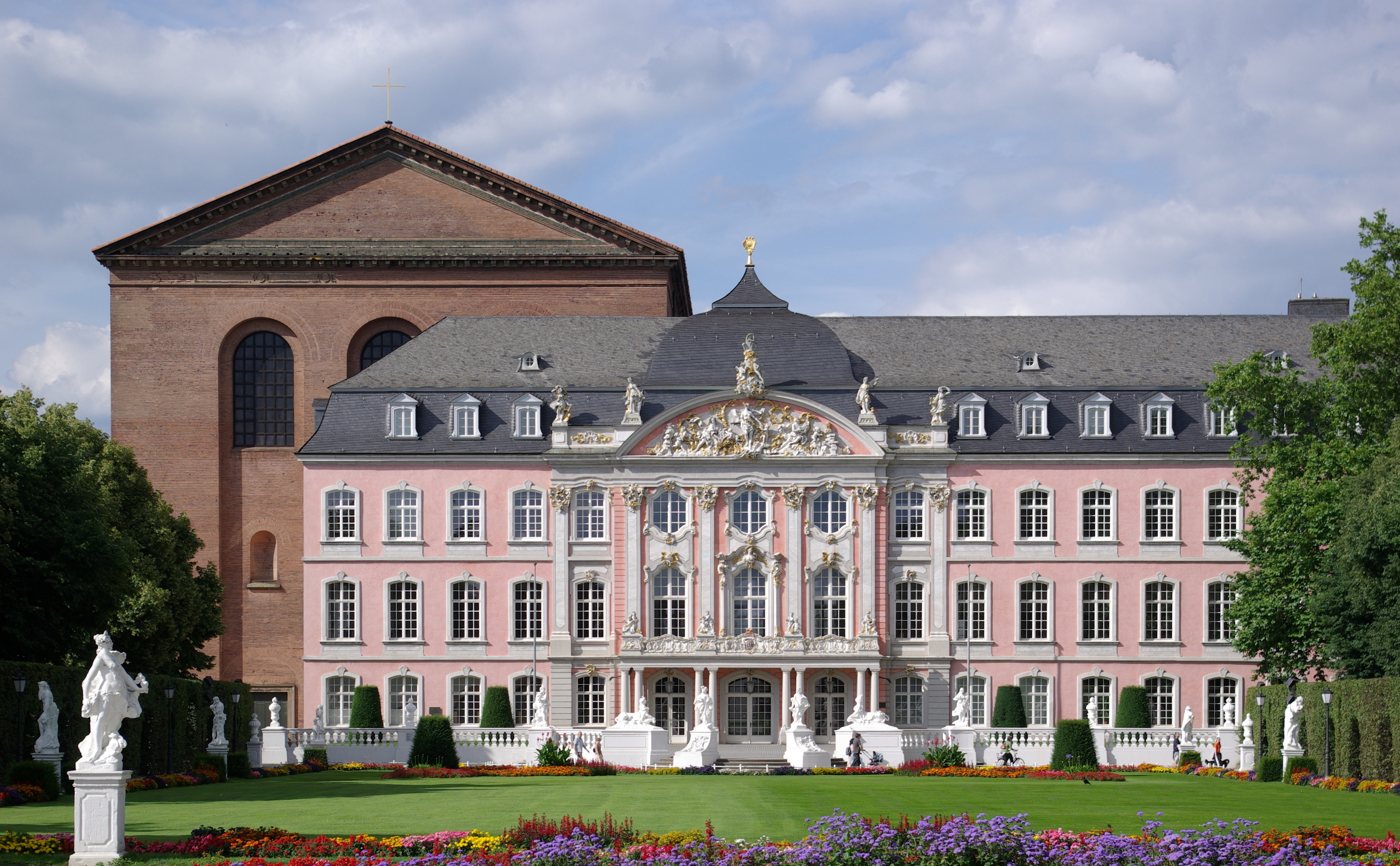
Electoral Palace

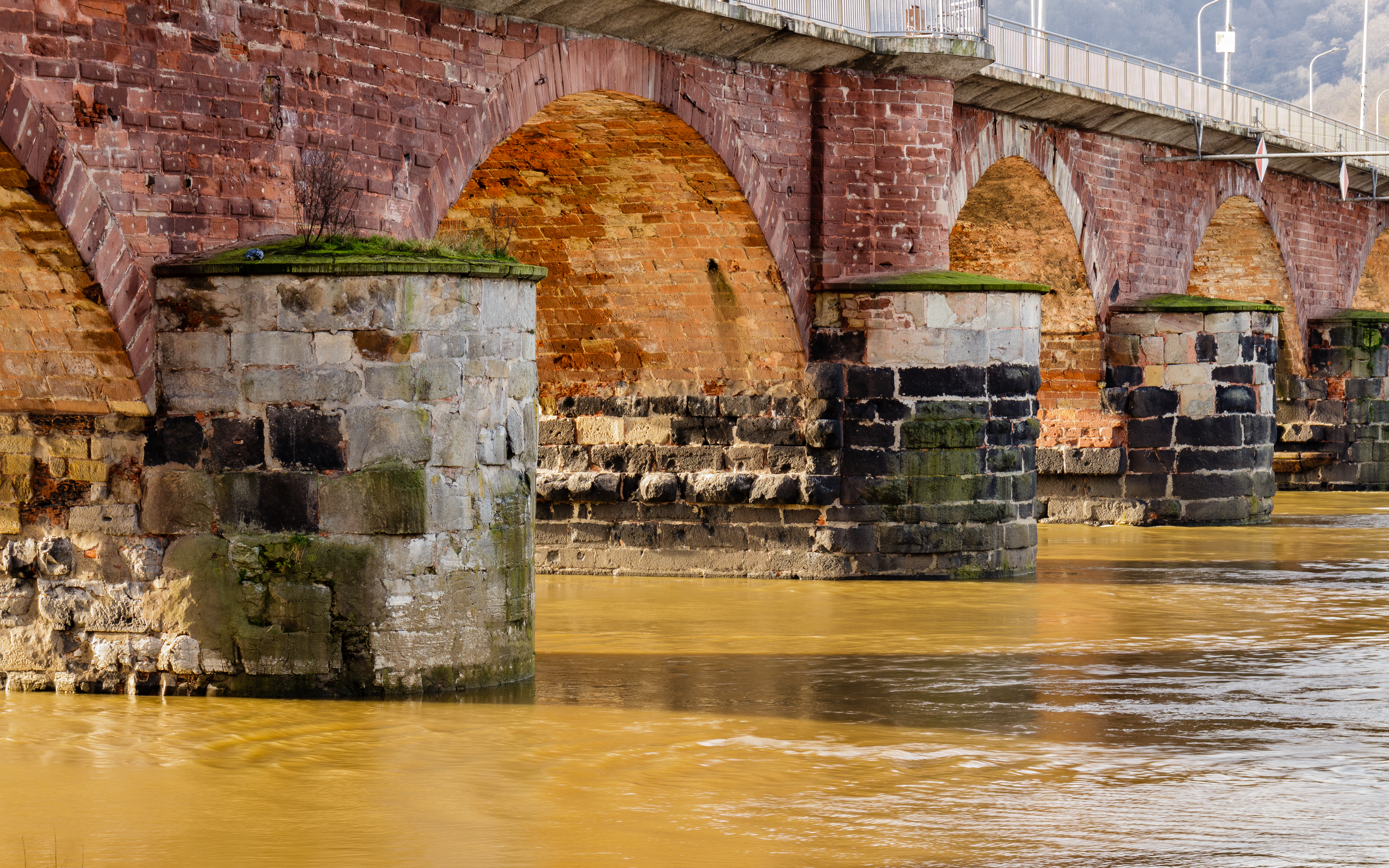
Römerbrücke over the Moselle (detail to the north side)
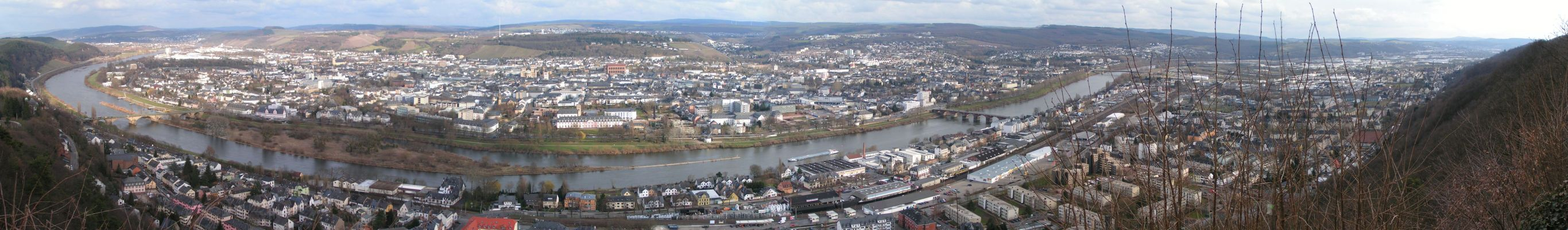
View of the city from St. Mary's Column (Mariensäule)
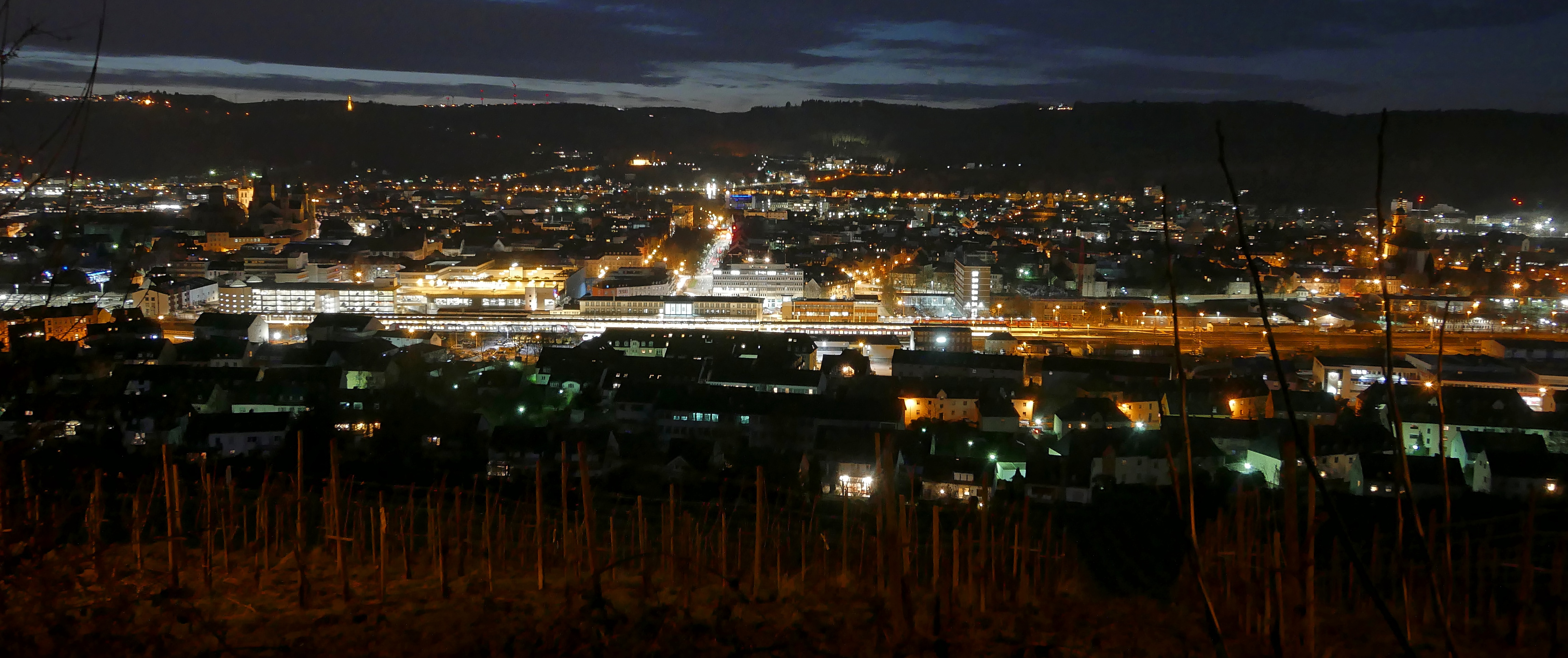
Trier from the east (Petrisberg)

== Geography ==
Trier sits in a hollow midway along the Moselle valley, with the most significant portion of the city on the east bank of the river. Wooded and vineyard-covered slopes stretch up to the Hunsrück plateau in the south and the Eifel in the north. The border with the Grand Duchy of Luxembourg is some 15 km (9 mi) away.

=== Neighbouring municipalities ===
Listed in clockwise order, beginning with the northernmost; all municipalities belong to the Trier-Saarburg district

Schweich, Kenn and Longuich (all part of the Verbandsgemeinde Schweich an der Römischen Weinstraße), Mertesdorf, Kasel, Waldrach, Morscheid, Korlingen and Gusterath (all in the Verbandsgemeinde Ruwer), Hockweiler, Franzenheim (both part of the Verbandsgemeinde Trier-Land), Konz and Wasserliesch (both part of the Verbandsgemeinde Konz), Igel, Trierweiler, Aach, Newel, Kordel, Zemmer (all in the Verbandsgemeinde Trier-Land).

=== Organisation of city districts ===
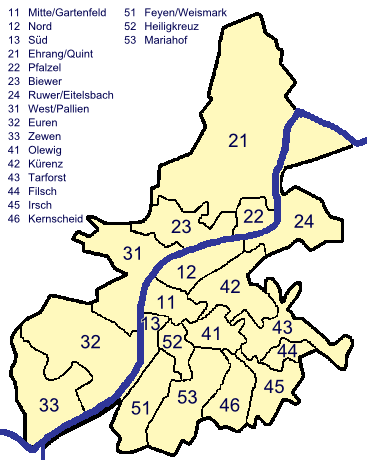
Districts of Trier

The Trier urban area is divided into 19 city districts. For each district, there is an Ortsbeirat (local council) of between 9 and 15 members, as well as an Ortsvorsteher (local representative). The local councils are charged with hearing the important issues that affect the district, although the final decision on any issue rests with the city council. The local councils nevertheless have the freedom to undertake limited measures within the bounds of their districts and their budgets.

The districts of Trier with area and inhabitants (31 December 2009):

Official district number	District with associated sub-districts	Area in km2	Inhabitants
11	Mitte/Gartenfeld	2.978	11,954
12	Nord (Nells Ländchen, Maximin)	3.769	13,405
13	Süd (St. Barbara, St. Matthias or St. Mattheis)	1.722	9,123
21	Ehrang/Quint	26.134	9,195
22	Pfalzel	2.350	3,514
23	Biewer	5.186	1,949
24	Ruwer/Eitelsbach	9.167	3,091
31	West/Pallien	8.488	7,005
32	Euren (Herresthal)	13.189	4,207
33	Zewen (Oberkirch)	7.496	3,634
41	Olewig	3.100	3,135
42	Kürenz (Alt-Kürenz, Neu-Kürenz)	5.825	8,708
43	Tarforst	4.184	6,605
44	Filsch	1.601	761
45	Irsch	4.082	2,351
46	Kernscheid	3.768	958
51	Feyen/Weismark	5.095	5,689
52	Heiligkreuz (Alt-Heiligkreuz, Neu-Heiligkreuz, St. Maternus)	2.036	6,672
53	Mariahof (St. Michael)	7.040	3,120
	Totals	117.210	105,076

=== Climate ===
Trier has an oceanic climate (Köppen: Cfb), but with greater extremes than the marine versions of northern Germany. Summers are warm except in unusual heat waves and winters are recurrently cold, but not harsh. Precipitation is high despite not being on the coast. As a result of the European heat wave in 2003, the highest temperature recorded was 39°C on 8 August of that year. On 25 July 2019, a record-breaking temperature of 40.6°C was recorded, a record which was again broken on 27 June 2026, as the result of the European heatwave in 2026. The lowest recorded temperature was −19.3°C on 2 February 1956.

Climate data for Trier (1991–2020 normals) (1948–present extremes)
Month	Jan	Feb	Mar	Apr	May	Jun	Jul	Aug	Sep	Oct	Nov	Dec	Year
Record high °C (°F)	14.7 (58.5)	20.3 (68.5)	24.5 (76.1)	28.5 (83.3)	30.7 (87.3)	41.1 (106.0)	40.6 (105.1)	39.0 (102.2)	34.8 (94.6)	26.8 (80.2)	20.6 (69.1)	17.0 (62.6)	41.1 (106.0)
Mean daily maximum °C (°F)	4.5 (40.1)	6.1 (43.0)	10.8 (51.4)	15.7 (60.3)	19.7 (67.5)	23.0 (73.4)	25.2 (77.4)	24.9 (76.8)	20.4 (68.7)	14.6 (58.3)	8.6 (47.5)	5.1 (41.2)	14.9 (58.8)
Daily mean °C (°F)	2.0 (35.6)	2.8 (37.0)	6.2 (43.2)	10.0 (50.0)	13.9 (57.0)	17.1 (62.8)	19.1 (66.4)	18.6 (65.5)	14.5 (58.1)	10.3 (50.5)	5.8 (42.4)	2.8 (37.0)	10.2 (50.4)
Mean daily minimum °C (°F)	−0.4 (31.3)	−0.2 (31.6)	2.2 (36.0)	4.9 (40.8)	8.6 (47.5)	11.7 (53.1)	13.7 (56.7)	13.3 (55.9)	10.0 (50.0)	6.8 (44.2)	3.3 (37.9)	0.6 (33.1)	6.2 (43.2)
Record low °C (°F)	−18.3 (−0.9)	−19.3 (−2.7)	−12.9 (8.8)	−6.2 (20.8)	−1.6 (29.1)	1.7 (35.1)	4.4 (39.9)	4.2 (39.6)	1.2 (34.2)	−3.4 (25.9)	−10.2 (13.6)	−14.4 (6.1)	−19.3 (−2.7)
Average precipitation mm (inches)	63.5 (2.50)	53.0 (2.09)	51.3 (2.02)	44.2 (1.74)	66.7 (2.63)	66.0 (2.60)	72.4 (2.85)	62.0 (2.44)	60.4 (2.38)	65.4 (2.57)	62.2 (2.45)	77.6 (3.06)	746.8 (29.40)
Average precipitation days (≥ 1.0 mm)	18.2	16.4	15.3	13.0	14.7	13.5	13.9	13.6	12.6	15.3	18.1	18.7	183.7
Average snowy days (≥ 1.0 cm)	5.9	4.9	1.6	0.1	0	0	0	0	0	0	1.0	4.3	17.8
Average relative humidity (%)	87.2	82.5	75.1	69.0	71.0	70.8	69.9	71.9	77.9	84.5	88.5	89.2	78.1
Mean monthly sunshine hours	48.1	70.3	130.9	187.1	213.8	224.7	235.1	215.3	159.8	96.3	44.8	38.7	1,663.4
Source 1: World Meteorological Organization
Source 2: Wetterdienst.de - Wetter- und Klimaberatung

== Demography ==
Historical population
Year	Pop.	±%
100	20,000	—
300	80,000	+300.0%
400	50,000	−37.5%
1250	12,000	−76.0%
1363	10,000	−16.7%
1542	8,500	−15.0%
1613	6,000	−29.4%
1702	4,300	−28.3%
1801	8,829	+105.3%
1871	21,442	+142.9%
1900	43,506	+102.9%
1910	49,112	+12.9%
1919	53,248	+8.4%
1919	57,341	+7.7%
1933	76,692	+33.7%
1939	88,150	+14.9%
1950	75,526	−14.3%
1961	87,141	+15.4%
1970	103,724	+19.0%
1987	94,118	−9.3%
2011	105,671	+12.3%
2018	110,636	+4.7%

Largest groups of foreign residents
Country of birth	Population (2013)
Poland	688
France	675
Luxembourg	573
Ukraine	476
Russia	444

== Culture ==
Trier has a municipal theatre, Theater Trier, for musical theatre, plays and dance.

=== Main sights ===
Roman Monuments, Cathedral of St. Peter and Church of Our Lady in Trier
UNESCO World Heritage Site
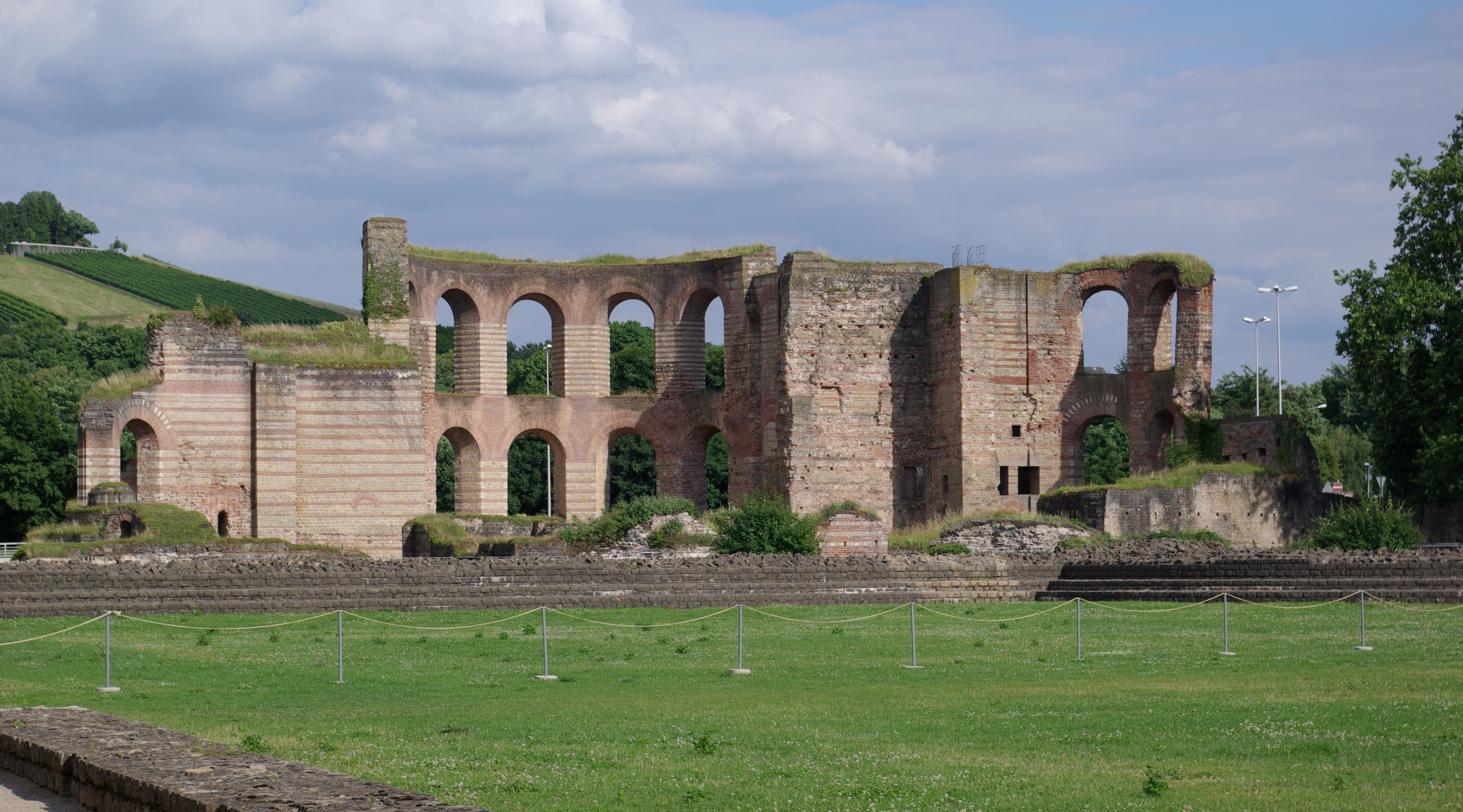
- Ruins of the Imperial Baths
- Interactive map of Roman Monuments, Cathedral of St. Peter and Church of Our Lady in Trier
- Includes: Amphitheater, Roman bridge, Barbara Baths, Igel Column, Porta Nigra, Imperial Baths, Aula Palatina, Cathedral and Liebfrauenkirche
- Criteria: Cultural: i, iii, iv, vi
- Reference: 367
- Inscription: 1986 (10th Session)

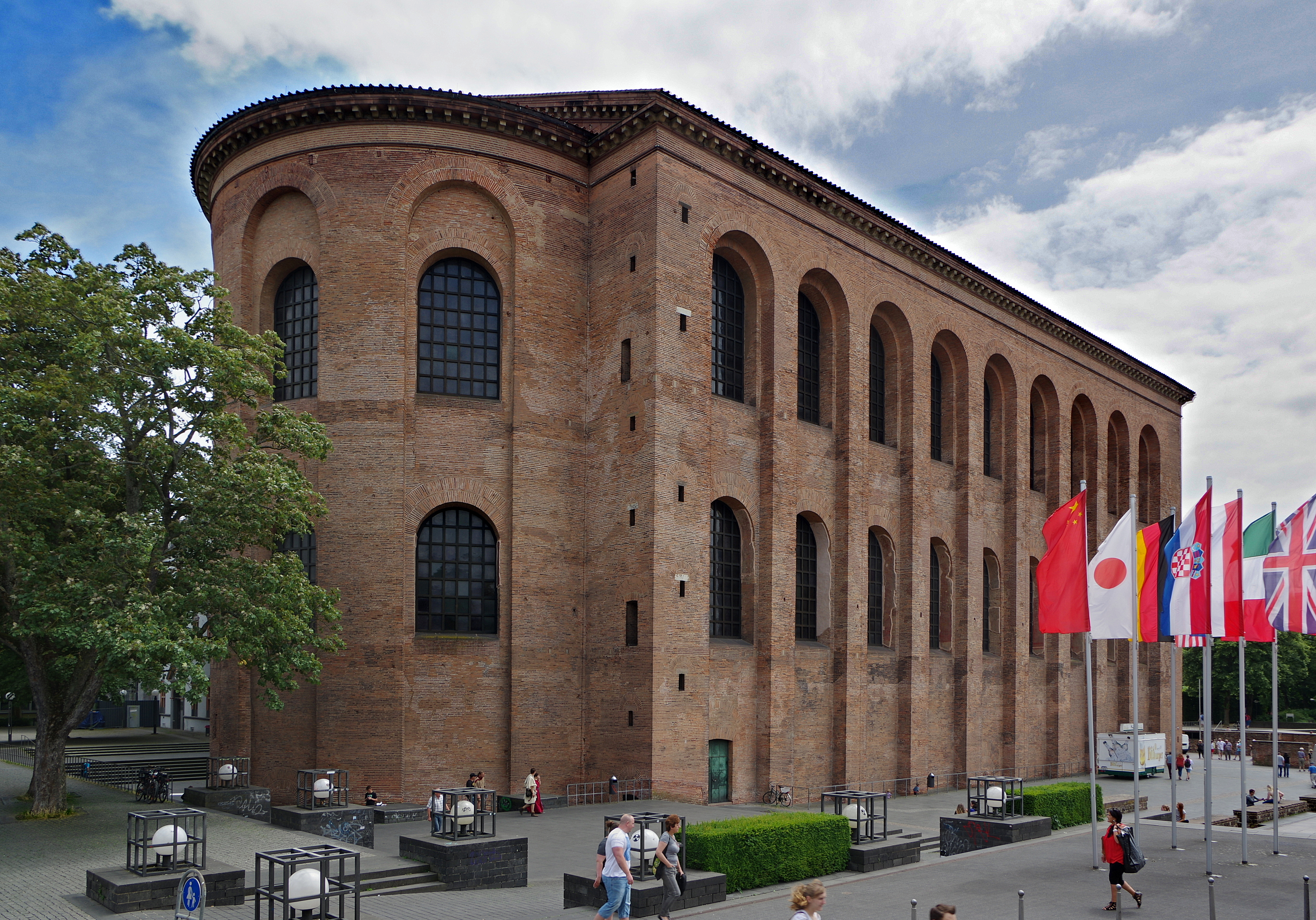
The Aula Palatina, or Constantine Basilica, built 4th century AD during the reign of Roman emperor Constantine I

Trier is known for its well-preserved Roman and medieval buildings, which include:

- the Porta Nigra, the best-preserved Roman city gate north of the Alps;
- the huge Aula Palatina, a basilica in the original Roman sense, was the 67 m (219.82 ft) long throne hall of Roman emperor Constantine; it is today used as a Protestant church; adjacent is the Electoral Palace, Trier;
- the Roman Trier Amphitheater;
- the 2nd century AD Roman bridge (Römerbrücke) across the Moselle, the oldest bridge north of the Alps still crossed by traffic;
- ruins of three Roman baths, among them the largest Roman baths north of the Alps; including the Barbara Baths, the Trier Imperial Baths, and the Forum Baths, Trier;
- Trier Cathedral (German: Trierer Dom or Dom St Peter), a Catholic church that dates back to Roman times; its Romanesque west façade with an extra apse and four towers is imposing and has been copied repeatedly; the Cathedral is home to the Holy Tunic, one of a number of garments claimed to be the robe Jesus was wearing when he died, as well as many other relics and reliquaries in the Cathedral Treasury;
- the Liebfrauenkirche (German for Church of Our Lady), which is one of the most important early Gothic churches in Germany, in some ways comparable to the architectural tradition of the French Gothic cathedrals;
- St Matthias' Abbey (Abtei St Matthias), still a functioning monastery whose medieval church harbours what is held to be the only tomb of an apostle located north of the Alps;
- St Gangolf's church is the city's 'own' church near the main market square (as opposed to the Cathedral, the bishop's church); largely Gothic;
- Saint Paulinus' Church, one of the most important Baroque churches in Rhineland-Palatinate and designed in part by the architect Balthasar Neumann;
- two old treadwheel cranes, one being the Gothic "Old Crane" (Alte Krahnen) or "Trier Moselle Crane" (Trierer Moselkrahn) from 1413, and the other the 1774 Baroque crane called the "(Old) Customs Crane" ((Alter) Zollkran) or "Younger Moselle Crane" (Jüngerer Moselkran) (see List of historical harbour cranes).

=== Museums ===
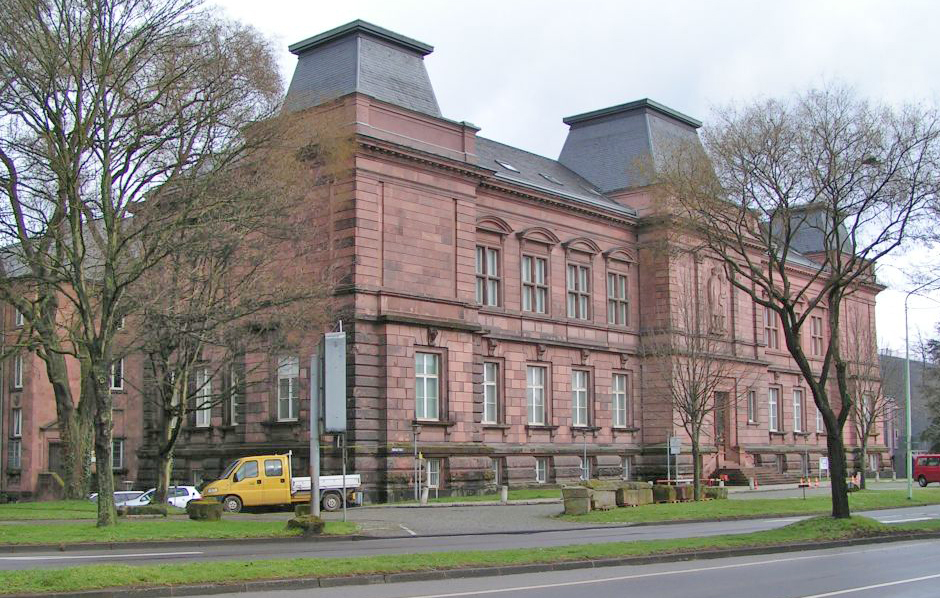
Rheinisches Landesmuseum Trier

- Rheinisches Landesmuseum (an important archaeological museum for the Roman period; also some early Christian and Romanesque sculpture)
- Domschatzkammer (Treasury of Trier Cathedral; with the Egbert Shrine, the reliquary of the Holy Nail, the cup of Saint Helena and other reliquaries, liturgical objects, ivories, manuscripts, etc., many from the Middle Ages)
- Museum am Dom, formerly Bischöfliches Dom- und Diözesanmuseum (Museum of the Diocese of Trier; religious art, also some Roman artefacts)
- Stadtmuseum Simeonstift (history of Trier, displaying among other exhibits a scale model of the medieval city)
- Karl Marx House; a museum exhibiting Marx's personal history, volumes of poetry, original letters, and photographs with personal dedications. There is also a collection of rare first editions and international editions of his works, as well as exhibits on the development of socialism in the 19th century
- Toy Museum of Trier
- Ethnological and open-air museum Roscheider Hof, a museum in the neighbouring town of Konz, right at the city limits of Trier, which shows the history of rural culture in the northwest Rhineland Palatinate and in the area where Germany, Luxembourg and Lorraine meet
- Fell Exhibition Slate Mine; site in the municipality of Fell, 20 km (12 mi) from Trier, containing an underground mine, a mine museum, and a slate mining trail.
- Memorial sculpture (2012) by Clas Steinmann to the deportation of Sinti and Romani people in Trier.

=== Annual events ===
- Since 1980, the Altstadtfest has been celebrated in the centre of Trier on the last weekend of June, followed by the Zurlaubener Heimatfest on the banks of the River Mosel two weeks later.
- Until 2014, Trier was home to Germany's largest Roman festival, Brot und Spiele (German for Bread and Games – a translation of the famous Latin phrase panem et circenses from the satires of Juvenal).
- Trier has been the base for the German round of the World Rally Championship since 2002, with the rally's presentation held next to the Porta Nigra.
- Trier holds a Christmas street festival every year called the Trier Christmas Market on the Hauptmarkt (Main Market Square) and the Domfreihof in front of the Cathedral of Trier.
- The Olewiger Weinfest is an annual wine festival held in the village of Olewig, just outside Trier. The festival takes place over three days, typically in August, and features a wide variety of activities, including wine tastings, live music and food stalls.

== Education ==
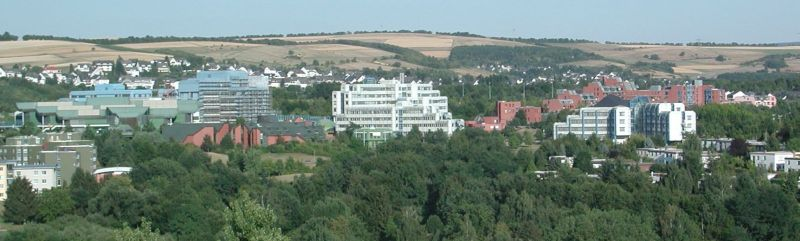
Uni Trier Campus 1

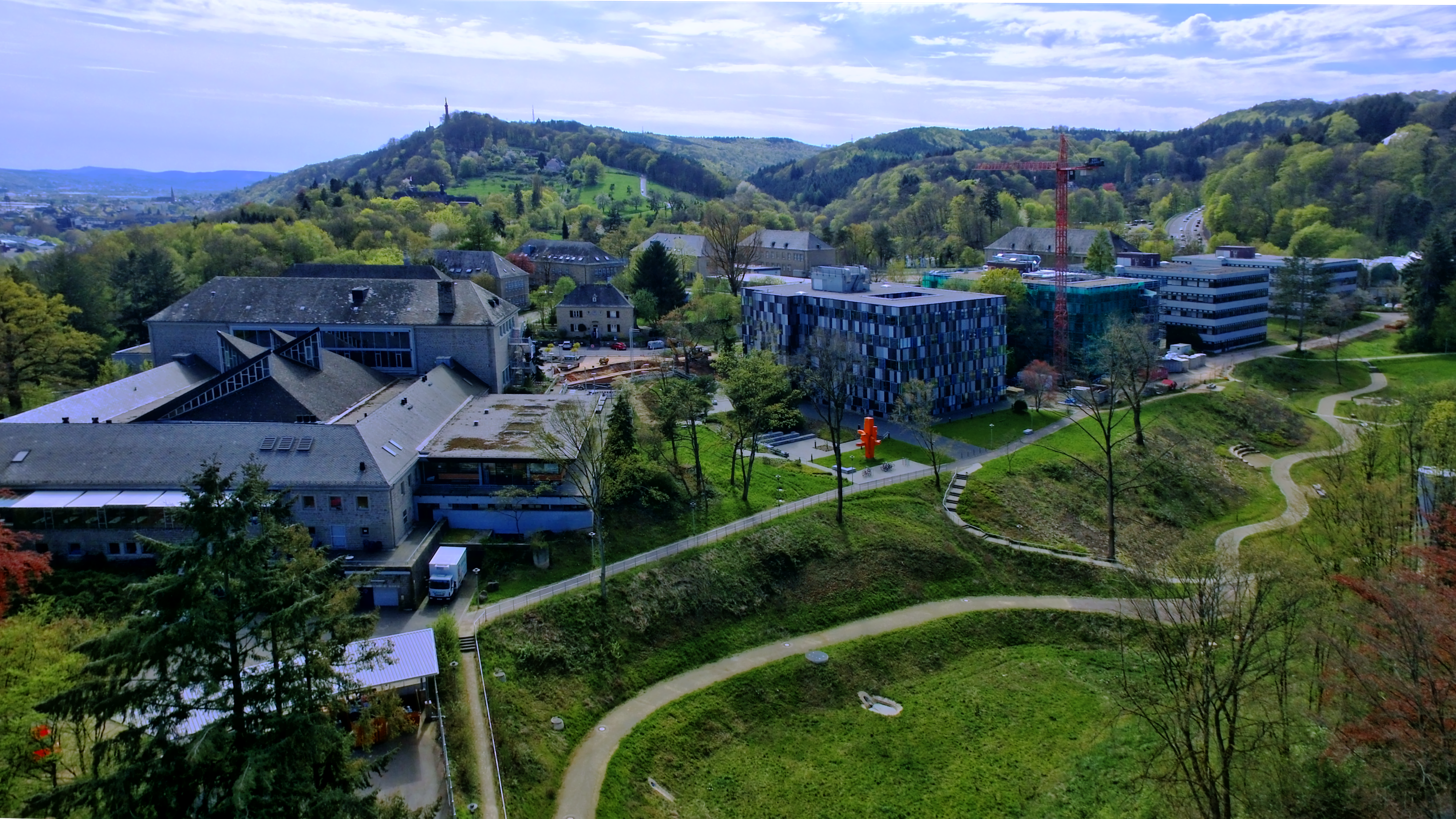
Trier University of Applied Sciences, central campus

Trier is home to the University of Trier, founded in 1473, closed in 1796 and restarted in 1970. The city also has the Trier University of Applied Sciences. The Academy of European Law (ERA) was established in 1992 and provides training in European law to legal practitioners. In 2010 there were about 40 Kindergärten, 25 primary schools and 23 secondary schools in Trier, such as the Humboldt Gymnasium Trier, Max Planck Gymnasium, Auguste Viktoria Gymnasium, Angela Merici Gymnasium, Friedrich Wilhelm Gymnasium and the Nelson-Mandela Realschule Plus, Kurfürst-Balduin Realschule Plus, Realschule Plus Ehrang.

== Transport ==
Transport association Verkehrsverbund Region Trier

Trier station has direct railway connections to many cities in the region. The nearest cities by train are Cologne, Saarbrücken and Luxembourg. Via the motorways A 1, A 48 and A 64, Trier is linked with Koblenz, Saarbrücken and Luxembourg. The nearest commercial (international) airports are in Luxembourg (0:40 h by car), Frankfurt-Hahn (1:00 h), Saarbrücken (1:00 h), Frankfurt (2:00 h) and Cologne/Bonn (2:00 h). The Moselle is an important waterway and is also used for river cruises. A new passenger railway service on the western side of the Mosel is scheduled to open in December 2024. Trier is located in the area of the transport association Verkehrsverbund Region Trier (VRT).

== Media ==
Regional television and radio programming is provided by SWR which broadcast from Stuttgart. However, the network also has a regional studio in the city. Due to close proximity to the Luxembourg border, RTL Lëtzebuerg can also be received in the city.

Local radio is provided by BigFM, RPR1. Trier, Antenne Trier, and Rockland Radio.

The local newspaper is served by Trierischer Volksfreund which publishes daily on print and online.

== Sports ==
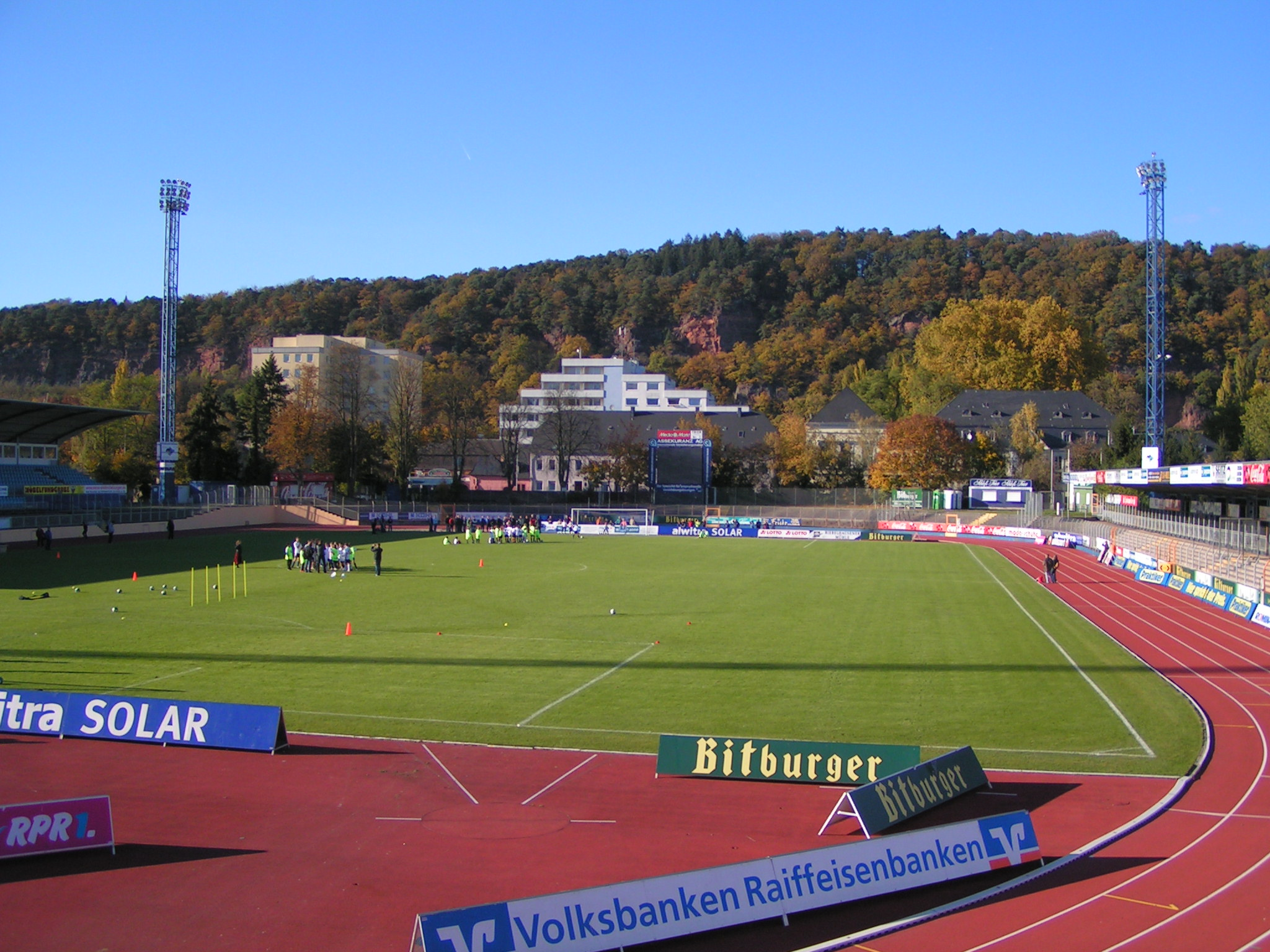
Moselstadium Trier

Major sports clubs in Trier include:

- SV Eintracht Trier 05, association football
- Gladiators Trier, basketball (former TBB Trier)
- DJK/MJC Trier, women's team handball
- Trier Cardinals, baseball
- PST Trier Stampers, American football
- FSV Trier-Tarforst, intera alia football and rugby

== International relations ==
Trier is a fellow member of the QuattroPole union of cities, along with Luxembourg, Saarbrücken and Metz (neighbouring countries: Luxembourg and France).

=== Twin towns – sister cities ===
Trier is twinned with:

- (United Kingdom) Gloucester, England, UK (1957)
- Metz, France (1957)
- Ascoli Piceno, Italy (1958)
- 's-Hertogenbosch, Netherlands (1968)
- Pula, Croatia (1971)
- Weimar, Germany (1987)
- Fort Worth, United States (1987)
- Nagaoka, Japan (2006)
- Xiamen, China (2010)
- Izium, Ukraine (2024)

=== Namesakes ===
- (United States) New Trier Township, Illinois, US, originally settled by people from Trier.
- (United States) New Trier, Minnesota, US, settled by people from Trier about 1856.
- (United States) New Trier High School, an Illinois school named after Trier.

== Notable people ==
- Doris Ahnen (born 1964), politician (SPD)
- Hans am Ende (1864–1918), painter
- Ambrose (c. 340–397), saint
- Apronia of Toul (6th century), nun and saint
- Athanasius of Alexandria (296/298–373), saint (in exile ca. 335)
- Ausonius (c. 310–395), Roman consul and poet
- Martin Bambauer (born 1970), church musician
- Reinhold Bartel (1926–1996), operatic tenor
- Wolf Graf von Baudissin (1907–1993), general, military planner and peace researcher
- August Beer (1825–1863), scientist
- Constantius Chlorus (c. 250–306), Roman emperor
- Ernst Ulrich Deuker (born 1954), musician
- Eucharius (died c. 250), first bishop of Trier
- Frank Findeiß (born 1971), poet
- Charles de Gaulle (1890–1970), General and French statesman, as commander of a battalion of Chasseurs during the French occupation of Rhineland
- Frank Geney (1979–2013), actor
- Franz Grundheber (1937–2025), baritone
- Helena (c. 250–330), saint, mother of Constantine the Great (residence in Trier by tradition)
- Reinhard Heß (1904–1998), painter and glass painter
- Ernst Huberty (1927–2023), sports reporter
- Eric Jelen (born 1965), tennis player
- Ludwig Kaas (1881–1952), Catholic priest and politician (Zentrum)
- Anja Kaesmacher (born 1974), operatic soprano
- Ursula Krechel (born 1947), writer and poet
- Gitta Lind (1925–1974), singer
- Xavier Bout de Marnhac (born 1951), French general, former commander of KFOR
- Heinrich Marx (1777–1838), lawyer, father of Karl Marx
- Henriette Marx (1788–1863), mother of Karl Marx
- Jenny Marx (1814–1881), revolutionary, drama critic
- Karl Marx (1818–1883), social philosopher and revolutionary
- Maximian (c. 250–310), Roman emperor
- Georg Meier (chess player) (born 1987), German grandmaster of chess
- Saint Modesta (died c. 680), founder and Abbess of the monastery of Oeren
- Oswald von Nell-Breuning (1890–1991), theologian
- Kaspar Olevianus (1536–1587), theologian
- Paulinus (died 358), bishop of Trier
- Johann Anton Ramboux (1790–1866), painter
- Salvian (c. 400s), Christian writer and witness to the sacking of Trier in 406
- Udo Samel (born 1953), Actor
- Gertrud Schloss (1899–1943), writer
- Frederick A. Schroeder (1833–1899), American politician, mayor of Brooklyn
- Otmar Seul (born 1943), lawyer, professor
- Günther Steines (1928–1982), athlete
- Peter Thullen (1907–1996), German-Ecuadorian mathematician
- Valentinian I (321–375), Roman emperor
- Valerius (died 320), second bishop of Trier
- François Weigel (born 1964), French pianist, composer and conductor
- Ludwig von Westphalen (1770 –1842), father-in-law of Karl Marx
- Edgar von Westphalen (1819 - 1890), Communist Politician, brother in law of Karl marx.
- Helga Zepp-LaRouche (born 1948), journalist and politician
- Robert Zimmer (born 1953), philosopher and essayist

== See also ==
- New Trier Township, llinois
