= Brot und Spiele =

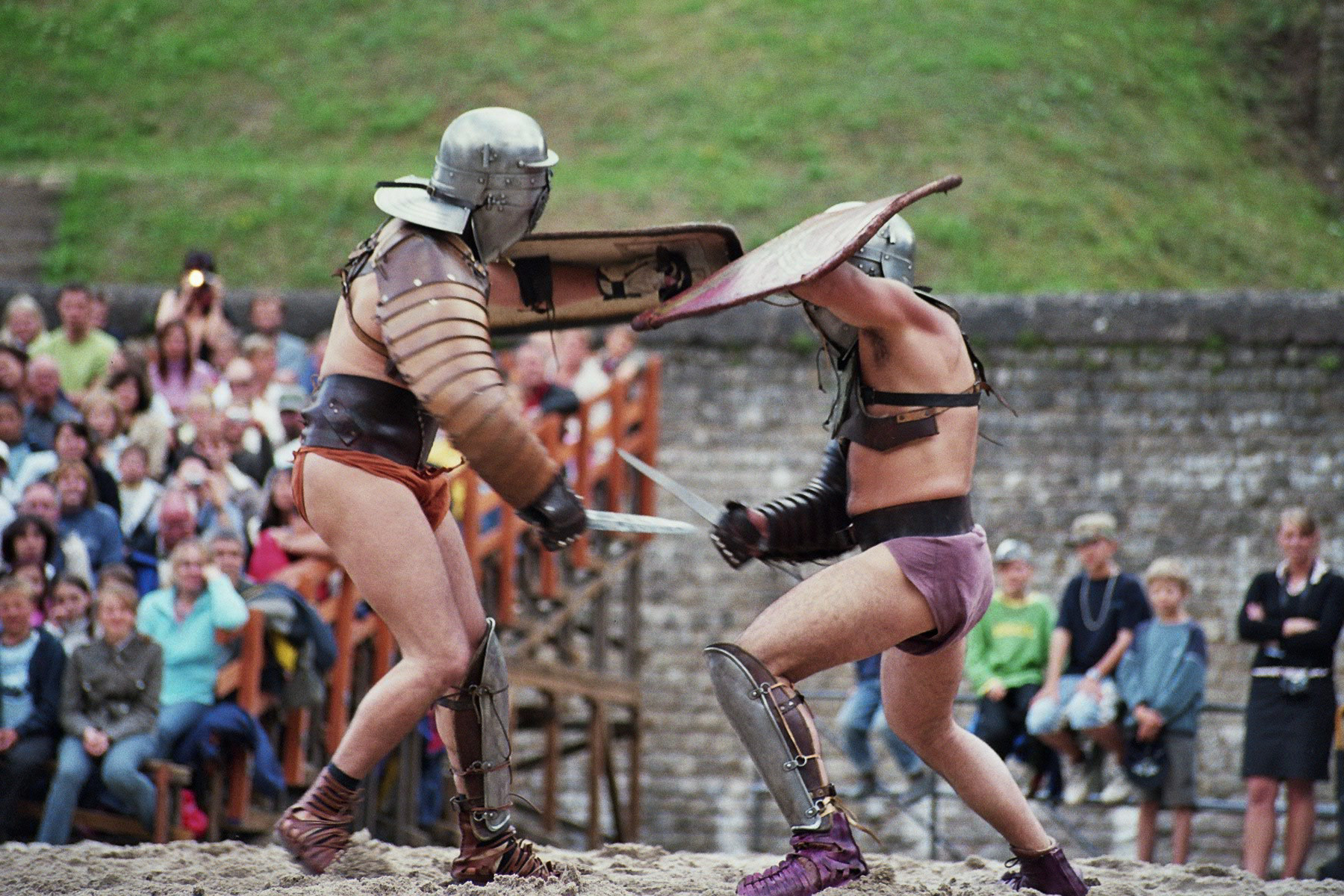
Gladiator fights at Brot & Spiele

Brot und Spiele (German for Bread and circuses) is Germany's biggest Roman festival, annually held in Germany's oldest city, Trier. The festival takes place at two of the city's Roman monuments: the Amphitheatre hosts theatre performances that include many gladiator fights and the Imperial Baths are used to display the civil and military life in the vicus.

In 2006 the festival was one of the winners of the "Germany – land of ideas" award.

The 2007 festival was from 10 to 12 August 2007 and, as Trier celebrated the 'Constantine year', Constantine the Great played an important role as – the Gladiator Show dealt with gladiator fights and intrigues at his wedding in Trier (in the year 307) and the mystic night was inspired by the mysterious death of his wife Fausta.

In 2008 the festival took place from 15 to 17 August, the show in the amphitheatre will deal with an old legend from Trier: the deadly competition between the builder of the amphitheatre and the builder of the aqueduct.

== History ==
=== Beginnings at the Rheinisches Landesmuseum ===
The event "Brot und Spiele" took place for the first time on 12 and 13 July 1997. Under the motto "Brot und Spiele – Antikes (Er)leben im Amphitheater", the Rheinisches Landesmuseum Trier organised a large campaign weekend as part of the Rhineland-Palatinate cultural summer event series, which presented an ancient arena spectacle according to scientific findings.

On 12 July 1997, Roman legionnaires of Legio XXII Primigenia and Legio VIII Augusta entered through the Porta Nigra and then into the Trier amphitheater. There they reenacted scenes from the storming of the city wall, as they probably happened in Trier in AD 187.

On 13 July 1997, the spectacle took place with 50 actors based on a script by historians Wilfried Stroh and Marcus Junkelmann. After an entry, the official giving the game opened the gladiator games with a Latin speech and a sacrifice to the gods. There were exhibition fights, also with horses. Parallel to the event there was a special exhibition and a panel discussion in the State Museum.

=== Roman spectacle of the city ===
From 2002 to 2010, Germany's largest Roman spectacle took place in Trier every August. In 2011, the event took place in September for the first time. The range of events extended to four locations: The "Spectaculum", a spectacle in connection with real gladiator fights, was performed against the historical backdrop of the amphitheater. From 2002 to 2005 the program was limited to gladiator fights by the Ars Dimicandi institute in Milan and acrobatic performances. Since 2006, the fights have been embedded in a historical staging that gave the overall event its title. Alexander Etzel-Ragusa was responsible for directing the productions, and he has also written the plays since 2007. Since 2009, the Spectaculum has been telling a sequel from the "Arena zu Trier" at the time of Emperor Mark Aurelius with recurring characters.

The majority of the imperial baths included the depiction of the civil and military Roman world. The tent camp on the vicus and the palaestra showed Roman handicrafts as well as art and medicine. Battle and combat presentations were staged on a parade ground in the palace garden. In the evening, during the "Mystical Night", the underground passages of the Kaiserthermen were staged with sound and light installations as well as dance performances. Accompanying this, a "Roman lounge" with live music invited young people in particular to visit the thermal baths in the evening.

The Rheinisches Landesmuseum has been part of the event since 2010 and presented authentic Roman craftsmanship in the "fabricae" (Roman expression for workshops).

Important principles of the event were authenticity and knowledge transfer, for which the organizers worked together with experts on Roman antiquity. Visitors could actively contribute and participate on the event site. Every year around 20,000 people attended the spectacle, which in 2006 was honored as a "selected place" by the German Land of Ideas initiative. In 2011, Brot & Spiele took place for the first time in the month of September. The event has also been extended to four days.

After another deficit in 2012, the city of Trier decided to suspend "Brot & Spiele" in 2013. Mainly because the number of visitors was lower than expected, the city had to pay over 100,000 euros in subsidies for 2012, more than twice as high as originally planned.
