= Gertrud Schloss =

German writer (1899–1942)

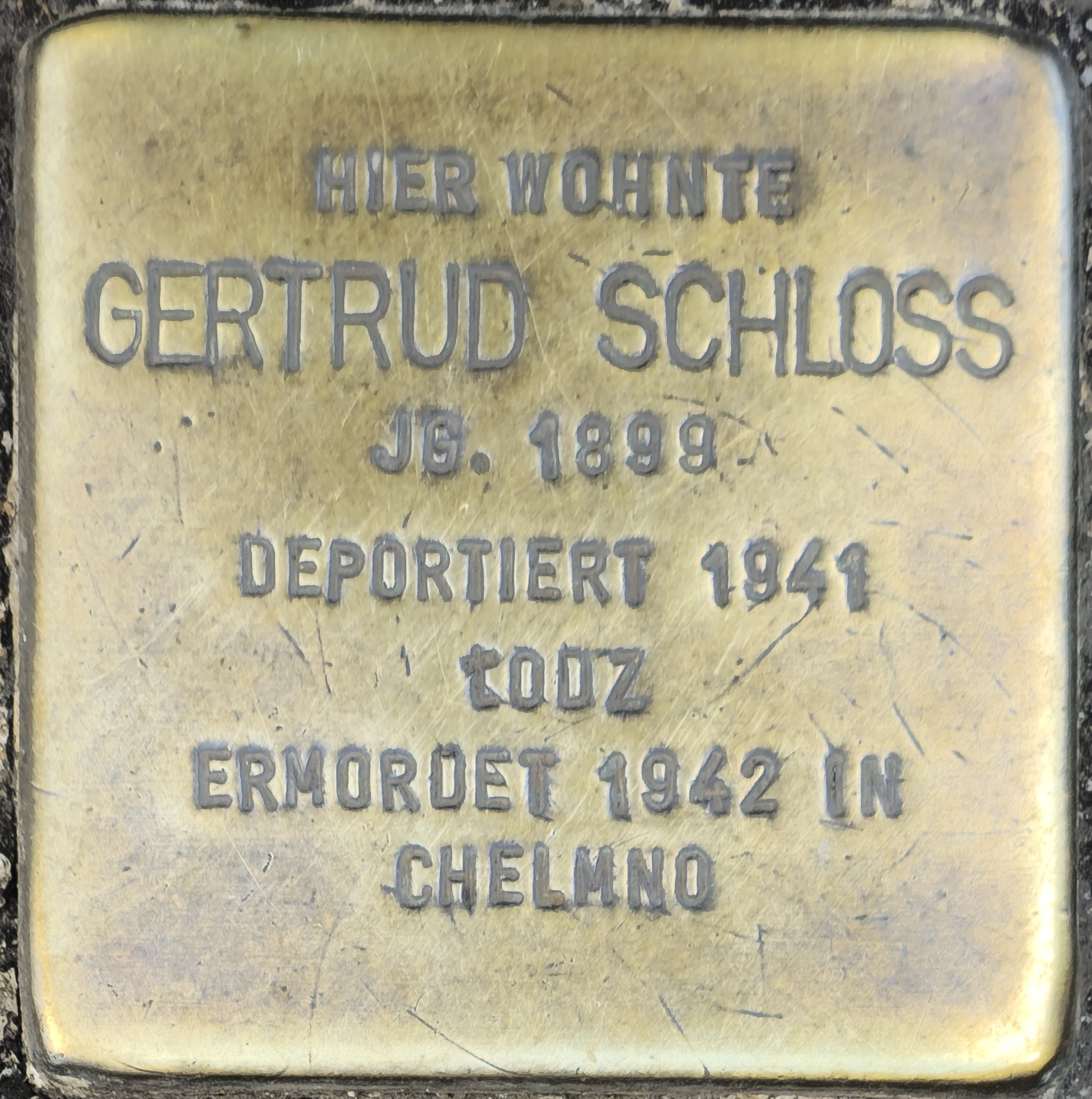
- Stolpersteine for Schloss at Saarstraße 31, Trier
- Born: 18 January 1899; Trier, German Empire
- Died: 1943; Chełmno, Nazi Germany (now Poland)
- Occupation: Writer
- Years active: 1923–1942

Lea Gertrud Schloß (18 January 1899–1942) was a German writer and human rights activist. After campaigning for women's rights with the Women's International League for Peace and Freedom, she began writing satirical articles and poems in opposition to the Nazi Party.

== Biography ==
Schloss was born on 18 January 1899 in the city of Trier in the east of what was then the German Empire. Born into a Jewish family, her parents ran a company specialising in the production of clothes for men and boys. In 1902, Schloss' brother Heinrich was born. Schloss attended the Royal Higher Girls' School (renamed the Auguste-Viktoria School in 1913), graduating in 1920. Due to her family's upper-middle-class background, Schloss was able to pursue her studies in economics in Würzburg, Frankfurt and Heidelberg; she obtained her doctorate in 1923 after completing her dissertation, Der Staat in der bolschewistischen Theorie und Praxis (lit. 'The State in Bolshevik Theory and Practice').

After completing her studies, Schloss returned to Trier in 1923, where she became an active member of the Women's International League for Peace and Freedom, serving as its Trier chairperson for a time. From 1924, Schloss regularly wrote political articles for the Trier-based social democratic magazine Volkswacht, including pieces on the class struggle, as well as satires mocking the Nazi Party; her first article for Volkswacht called for the establishment of a united European state "from Spain to the Urals". In addition to Schloss' political pieces, she also acted as a theatre and concert reviewer; in 1926, Schloss was elected chairwoman of the Freie Volksbühne Theatre Association.

Schloss regularly gave talks at Social Democratic Party women's events, and served as the second chairperson of the SPD Women's Organisation in 1924.

On 27 January 1928, Schloss' play Ahasver was performed at Theater Trier; it was later performed in Greiz. The play followed a Wandering Jew and referenced the treatment of Jewish people by the Nazis. The script of Ahasver has since been lost. In 1932, Schloss published a collection of lesbian love poetry entitled Begegnungen (lit. 'Encounters'). In the following years, she published a series of novels under the pseudonym Alice Carno.

Following the rise to power of Adolf Hitler and the Nazi Party, Schloss moved to Frankfurt in 1933, where she lived with her widowed agent and likely lover, Mary Eck-Toll (1884–1963). Schloss applied to move to Luxembourg; when this was approved in 1939, she moved to Walferdange. On 10 May 1940, following the German invasion of Luxembourg, Schloss and her brother Heinrich, as well as 512 other Jews, were deported to the Łódź Ghetto.

It is widely presumed that Schloss was murdered in 1942 at Chełmno extermination camp.

== Recognition ==
Schloss' poetry collection Encounters was considered lost until it was found and republished in 1985 by the Trier-based publisher Éditions trèves under the title Die Nacht des Eisens (lit. 'The Night of Iron'), with an additional biography of Schloss by historian Tamara Breitbach.

In 1990, the city government of Trier named a street in the Feyen district after Schloss. In 1999, to commemorate the 57th anniversary of Schloss' death, the writer and director Jutta Schubert commemorated her in the play Des Teufels Komödiant (lit. 'The Devil's Comedian'), which was performed at the Theater Trier where Schloss' own play Ahasver had been performed 71 years earlier.

A Stolperstein commemorating Schloss, her mother and her brother, is placed at Saarstraße 31 in Trier.
