= Ralingen =

- Municipality
- Coat of arms

- Location of Ralingen within Trier-Saarburg district
- Interactive map of Ralingen
- Location within Germany Location within Rhineland-Palatinate
- Coordinates: 49°48′30″N 6°30′56″E
- Country: Germany
- State: Rhineland-Palatinate
- District: Trier-Saarburg
- Municipal assoc.: Trier-Land
- Subdivisions: 6

Government
  - Mayor (2019–24): Alfred Wirtz (Greens)

Area
  - Total: 27.64 km^{2} (10.67 sq mi)
- Elevation: 160 m (520 ft)

Population (2025-12-31)
  - Total: 1,953
  - Density: 70.66/km^{2} (183.0/sq mi)
- Time zone: UTC+01:00 (CET)
  - Summer (DST): UTC+02:00 (CEST)
- Postal codes: 54310
- Dialling codes: 06585
- Vehicle registration: TR
- Website: www.ralingen.de

Ralingen is a municipality in the Trier-Saarburg district, in Rhineland-Palatinate, Germany.
