= Trier-Land =

- Verbandsgemeinde
- Coat of arms

- Location of Verbandsgemeinde Trier-Land in the district
- Interactive map of Trier-Land
- Location within Germany Location within Rhineland-Palatinate
- Coordinates: 49°46′N 6°33′E
- Country: Germany
- State: Rhineland-Palatinate
- District: Trier-Saarburg
- Subdivisions: 11 municipalities

Government
  - Mayor (2018–26): Michael Holstein (FW)

Area
  - Total: 175.5 km^{2} (67.8 sq mi)

Population (2025-12-31)
  - Total: 21,206
  - Density: 120.8/km^{2} (313.0/sq mi)
- Time zone: UTC+01:00 (CET)
  - Summer (DST): UTC+02:00 (CEST)
- Vehicle registration: TR
- Website: www.trier-land.de

Trier-Land is a Verbandsgemeinde ("collective municipality") in the Trier-Saarburg district, in Rhineland-Palatinate, Germany. It is situated on the border with Luxembourg, north and west of Trier. The seat of the municipality is in Trier, itself not part of the municipality.

The Verbandsgemeinde Trier-Land consists of the following Ortsgemeinden ("local municipalities"):

1. Aach
2. Franzenheim
3. Hockweiler
4. Igel
5. Kordel
6. Langsur
7. Newel
8. Ralingen
9. Trierweiler
10. Welschbillig
11. Zemmer

== International relations ==
Trier-Land is twinned with:

- Podolsk, Russia
