= Aach, Rhineland-Palatinate =

Aach
- Municipality
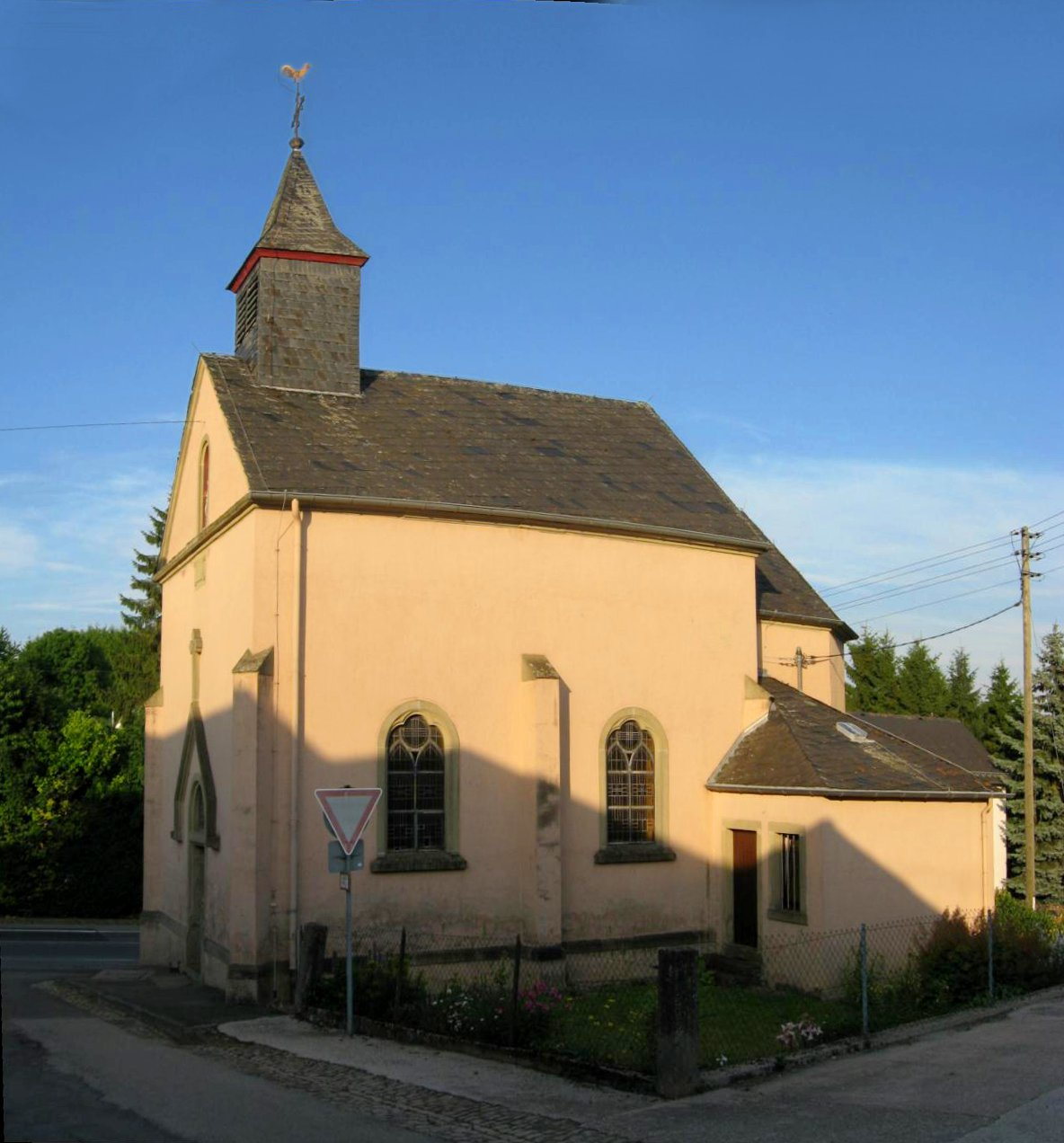

- Coat of arms

- Location of Aach within Trier-Saarburg district
- Interactive map of Aach
- Location within Germany Location within Rhineland-Palatinate
- Coordinates: 49°47′28″N 06°35′24″E
- Country: Germany
- State: Rhineland-Palatinate
- District: Trier-Saarburg
- Municipal assoc.: Trier-Land
- Subdivisions: 3

Government
  - Mayor (2019–24): Claudia Thielen

Area
  - Total: 6.96 km^{2} (2.69 sq mi)
- Elevation: 271 m (889 ft)

Population (2025-12-31)
  - Total: 1,034
  - Density: 149/km^{2} (385/sq mi)
- Time zone: UTC+01:00 (CET)
  - Summer (DST): UTC+02:00 (CEST)
- Postal codes: 54298
- Dialling codes: 0651
- Vehicle registration: TR
- Website: www.gemeinde-aach.de

Aach (German: [aːx]) is a municipality in the German state of Rhineland-Palatinate. It is part of Trier-Land, a Verbandsgemeinde.

== History ==
The settlement of Aach dates to the Bronze Age. Later there also was a settlement of the Roman Empire. The current municipality was first mentioned in the year 953 under its Latin name Aquacuum. Despite being situated so close to the city of Trier, it was not part of the Archbishopric of Trier. Belonging to the Benedictine monastery St. Irminen, it was reichsfrei. This prompted many Jews to settle in Aach after they were expelled from Trier in the 16th century.

During the time of the Napoleonic Wars Aach was—according to the Treaty of Lunéville 1802—a part of France. After Napoleon's ultimate defeat in 1815 Aach became a part of the new Prussian Rhineland province. Prussia itself became a part of the German Empire in 1871.

After World War II Aach became a part of the new (West) German state of Rhineland-Palatinate.

Aach is known for its "Viez", the typical hard cider of the region.

== Law and government ==
The municipal council (Ortsgemeinderat) of Aach is made up of sixteen elected members. At the most recent election on June 9, 2024, the turnout was 64.6%. Out of 797 eligible voters, 515 cast ballots and 500 valid votes were counted.

In the direct election for mayor at the same date, Claudia Thielen (CDU) was re-elected with 91.54% of the valid votes.

== Geography ==
Aach lies about 6 km north of the center of Trier. It is situated in the southern Eifel mountains. Hohensonne is a village located just to the west and is included in the municipality.

Aach can be reached via Autobahn A 64 (connecting Trier and Luxembourg) at exit no. 3 about 3.7 km south of Aach. The next railway station is the central station of Trier.

== Jewish History ==
Jews first settled in Aach in 1589. Their population peaked at 86 in 1850. Most Jews were cattle traders, and were fairly successful. The town's synagogue was inaugurated in 1860. In 1938, the majority of Aach's Jews emigrated. Many of those who remained were murdered in the Holocaust. There is no longer an organized Jewish community in Aach. However, the synagogue and Jewish cemetery (dating back to 1600) still exist.
