= Anja Kaesmacher =

German operatic soprano (born 1974)

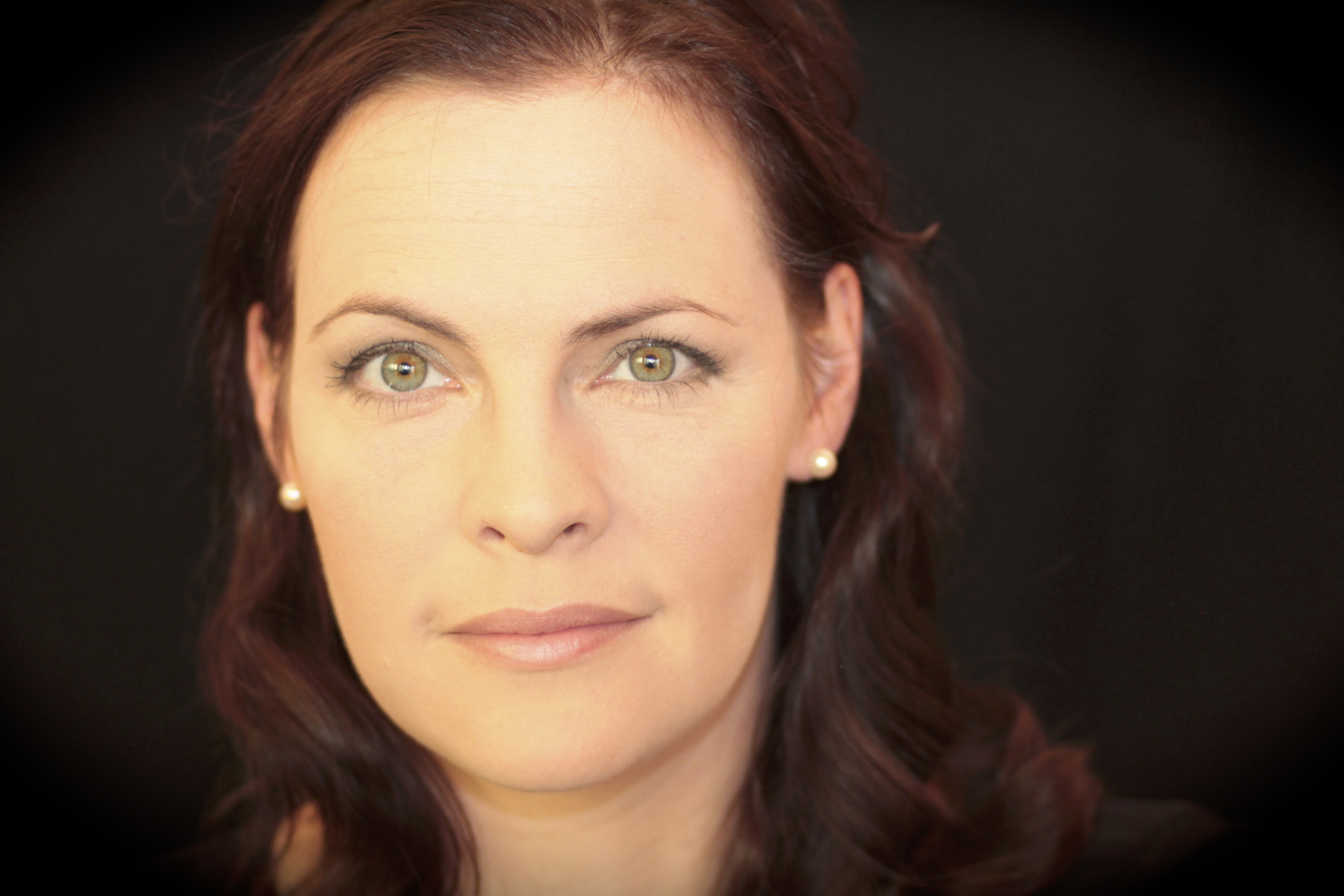
- Kaesmacher in 2011
- Born: 3 May 1974 (age 51); Trier, Rhineland-Palatinate, Germany
- Other names: Anja Börner
- Occupations: Operatic soprano; teacher
- Organizations: Mainfranken Theater Würzburg
- Awards: Bayerischer Kunstförderpreis

Anja Kaesmacher, married name Anja Börner (born 3 September 1974) is a German operatic soprano and a teacher of music, ethics and performing arts. She has performed contemporary music, especially world premieres by Manfred Trojahn.

== Life and career ==
Born in Trier, Kaesmacher studied with Charlotte Lehmann and Ingeborg Hallstein at the Hochschule für Musik Würzburg and completed her studies in 2000 with the opera and concert exam. Since 2006, she has been taught by Monika Bürgener.

Kaesmacher made her debut at the Mainfranken Theater Würzburg in the 1997/98 season and remained a member of the ensemble until 2008. She appeared there in Wagner's Die Feen. She then began to work freelance. She has appeared as a guest at the Staatstheater Wiesbaden, Staatstheater Braunschweig, Staatstheater Kassel, Meiningen Court Theatre, Bielefeld Opera, Theater Heildelberg and Theater Chemnitz, among others. She performed the double role of Giullia/Carolina Fabbri in Manfred Trojahn's opera Limonen aus Sizilien.

In the field of contemporary music, Kaesmacher has worked with conductors such as Jun Märkl and Matthias Pintscher and the orchestras including the MDR Leipzig Radio Symphony Orchestra. She appeared at the Musica Viva festival in Strasbourg in 2007 in Unsuk Chin's Die Troerinnen and Kalà, with Juanita Lascarro, Ruth Sandhoff, Andreas Hörl, the WDR Rundfunkchor Köln and the Southwest German Radio Symphony Orchestra conducted by Rupert Huber, in 2007. She has performed several world premieres of Manfred Trojahn's works, such as the lettera amorosa in 2007 on the occasion of the reopening of the Anna Amalia Library in Weimar, Che fie di me for two sopranos and orchestra, together with soprano Mojca Erdmann and the Southwest German Radio Symphony Orchestra, and in 2009 Ariosi for soprano, basset horn and orchestra, with Sabine Meyer and the Württembergische Philharmonie Reutlingen conducted by Trojahn. In 2015 she sang Four Last Songs by Richard Strauss in Bad Nauheim.

In addition to singing, she studied philosophy and Catholic theology at the Justus Liebig University Giessen from 2010 to 2011 and passed the second Staatsexamen for teaching music and ethics in May 2014. Kaesmacher achieved a teaching qualification for the subject performing arts in 2015 and has worked at the Freiherr-vom-Stein-Schule in Wetzlar.

Kaesmacher is married to the German tenor Heiko Börner; they have two sons.

== Awards ==
- 1993 Bundespreis Jugend musiziert
- 2003 Bayerischer Kunstförderpreis in der Sparte Darstellende Kunst.
