= Hockweiler =

- Municipality
- Coat of arms

- Location of Hockweiler within Trier-Saarburg district
- Interactive map of Hockweiler
- Location within Germany Location within Rhineland-Palatinate
- Coordinates: 49°42′8″N 6°41′36″E
- Country: Germany
- State: Rhineland-Palatinate
- District: Trier-Saarburg
- Municipal assoc.: Trier-Land

Government
  - Mayor (2019–24): Uwe Seher

Area
  - Total: 2.08 km^{2} (0.80 sq mi)
- Elevation: 380 m (1,250 ft)

Population (2025-12-31)
  - Total: 281
  - Density: 135/km^{2} (350/sq mi)
- Time zone: UTC+01:00 (CET)
  - Summer (DST): UTC+02:00 (CEST)
- Postal codes: 54316
- Dialling codes: 06588
- Vehicle registration: TR
- Website: www.hockweiler.de

Hockweiler is a municipality in the Trier-Saarburg district, in Rhineland-Palatinate, Germany.
