= Trierweiler =

- Municipality
- Coat of arms

- Location of Trierweiler within Trier-Saarburg district
- Interactive map of Trierweiler
- Location within Germany Location within Rhineland-Palatinate
- Coordinates: 49°45′48″N 6°33′34″E
- Country: Germany
- State: Rhineland-Palatinate
- District: Trier-Saarburg
- Municipal assoc.: Trier-Land
- Subdivisions: 4

Government
  - Mayor (2019–24): Dieter Müller (SPD)

Area
  - Total: 18.42 km^{2} (7.11 sq mi)
- Elevation: 290 m (950 ft)

Population (2025-12-31)
  - Total: 3,725
  - Density: 202.2/km^{2} (523.8/sq mi)
- Time zone: UTC+01:00 (CET)
  - Summer (DST): UTC+02:00 (CEST)
- Postal codes: 54311
- Dialling codes: 0651
- Vehicle registration: TR
- Website: www.gemeinde-trierweiler.de

Trierweiler is a municipality in the Trier-Saarburg district, in Rhineland-Palatinate, Germany. The name Trierweiler was first mentioned in 1202. Because of the town's close proximity to the Luxembourg border, many residents commute to work in Luxembourg.
