= Franzenheim =

- Municipality
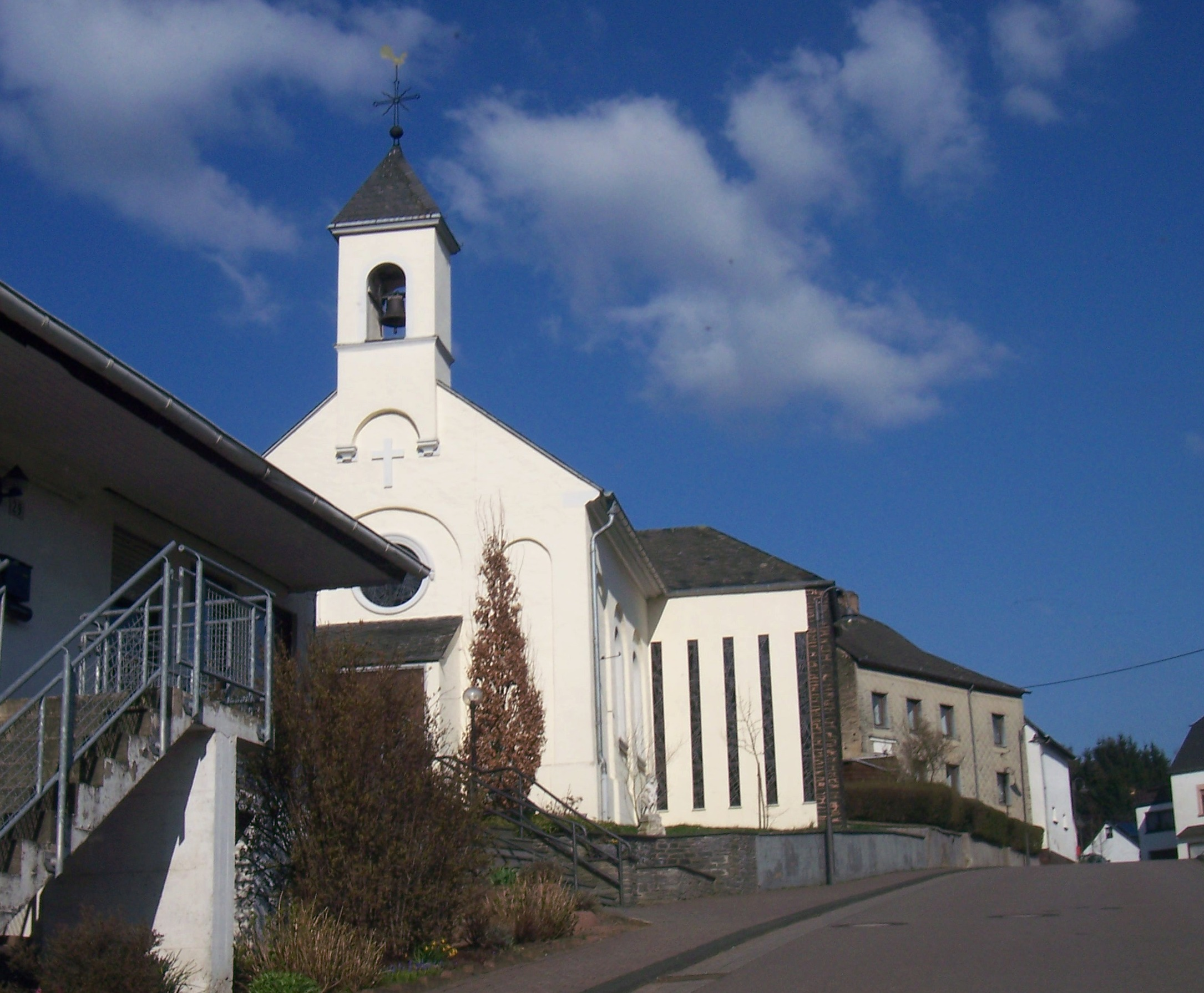

- Coat of arms

- Location of Franzenheim within Trier-Saarburg district
- Interactive map of Franzenheim
- Location within Germany Location within Rhineland-Palatinate
- Coordinates: 49°41′7″N 6°41′15″E
- Country: Germany
- State: Rhineland-Palatinate
- District: Trier-Saarburg
- Municipal assoc.: Trier-Land

Government
  - Mayor (2019–24): Christian Minn

Area
  - Total: 6.47 km^{2} (2.50 sq mi)
- Elevation: 310 m (1,020 ft)

Population (2025-12-31)
  - Total: 358
  - Density: 55.3/km^{2} (143/sq mi)
- Time zone: UTC+01:00 (CET)
  - Summer (DST): UTC+02:00 (CEST)
- Postal codes: 54316
- Dialling codes: 06588
- Vehicle registration: TR
- Website: www.franzenheim.de

Franzenheim is a municipality in the Trier-Saarburg district, in Rhineland-Palatinate, Germany.

It was first mentioned in a document of 1098 and until the end of the 18th century was an independent entity belonging to the cathedral chapter of Trier.
