= Otmar Seul =

Otmar Seul was born on August 30, 1943, in Trier (Germany) and held lectures at the Paris Ouest-Nanterre-La Défense (Paris X-Nanterre) from October 1989 to September 2011 as a professor of legal German. In cooperation with his German counterpart Werner Merle, he founded the integrated curriculum of French and German law in 1994–1995, joining together the University of Paris Ouest-Nanterre-La Défense (France) and the University of Potsdam (Germany).

== Co-founder of binational curricula: internationalisation of studies and research ==
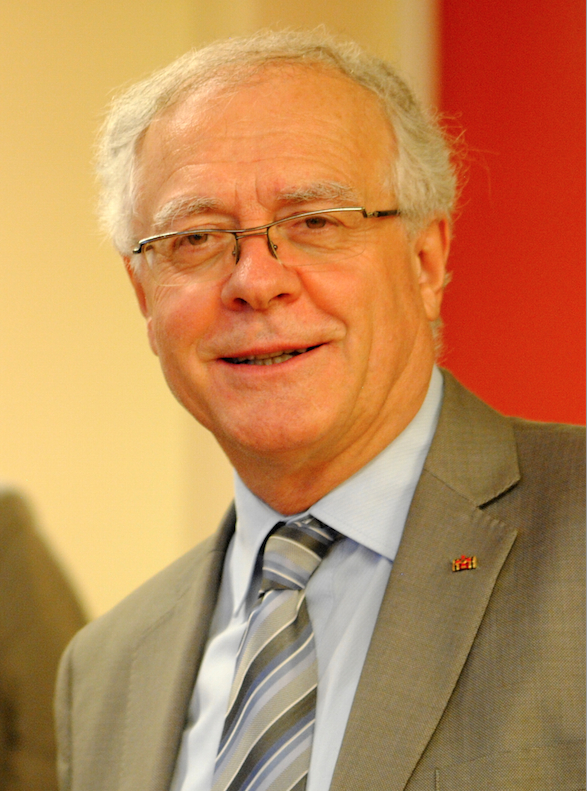
Otmar Seul

Otmar Seul read History and Romance studies at the Johannes Gutenberg University in Mainz (Germany) as well as Human Sciences at the University of Paris-Descartes. He then completed a PhD in Economic and Social Sciences in 1986 under the supervision of Eberhard Schmidt at the Carl von Ossietzky University in Oldenburg (Germany) on the consideration by French unions of the right to direct and collective expression and of other new workers’ rights established by the Auroux acts (1982–1985). Otmar Seul's interest revolves mainly around legal issues in social research and new ways of transnational legal studies.

== Double degrees and integrated French-German curricula in legal sciences ==
In Nanterre, Otmar Seul developed the bilingual double degree French Law / German Law, founded in 1986, extending from the undergraduate (DEUG) to the postgraduate program (Master). He also turned it into a French-German integrated curriculum in cooperation with the University of Potsdam, offering a double diploma (1994/95). Since the 1990s, Paris Ouest-Nanterre-La Défense offered more than 25 courses of German law throughout all diplomas, thus becoming the first French University in this field. However, since it was taught in German, this program seemed to be threatened by the decreasing number of students learning the partner language, both in France and in Germany. On 12 March 2001, Otmar Seul submitted a petition to both French and German governments in which he voiced concerns about the restrained cooperation policy between Paris and Berlin.

== A European network of academic cooperation ==
Since the 1990s, Otmar Seul has created and developed a European network of academic cooperation (Nanterre Network) in order to settle the French-German integrated curriculum in the European Higher Education and Research Area, to give its graduates access to international careers and in order to promote French and German language and legal cultures in Europe. This (informal) network, especially based on the Erasmus-Socrates agreements and regrouping more than 40 partner universities, was formed in three main steps: 1° by integrating the Law Faculties of the Humboldt University in Berlin, of Halle-Wittenberg, of Potsdam, of Dresden (TU) and other universities of the new Länder in 1990 after the German unification; 2° by opening the network to universities of Central and Eastern Europe (Poland and the Baltic States in particular) as soon as in 2000, in some cases before they even joined the EU in 2004; 3° the last to join in 2006 were the Turkish universities (among them the Universities of Istanbul, Galatasaray, Yeditepe, and Bilgi), which belonged to a country still preparing to enter the EU.

Since 1995, annual meetings have taken place in Nanterre/Paris, Siena, Berlin, Halle, Pamplona, Prague, Vilnius, Lodz, Riga, Paris, Fribourg (Switzerland), Istanbul, Sevilla, Barcelona/ Andorra, Berlin, Lisbon, Vienna, Dresden, and Zurich. Since the Bologna Declaration (1999), during these meetings, delegates from partner universities address the issue of the adaptation of their own national Higher Education system to the European standards. Coupled with a colloquium or a workshop, these meetings also lead to discussions about the broad tendencies of the ongoing law harmonization in EU countries.

== French-German Summer Universities with other countries ==
=== In Europe ===
Otmar Seul was involved in the creation of summer universities in legal sciences in cooperation with The University of Paris Ouest-Nanterre-La Défense as well as the Universities of Frankfurt on Main and Vilnius in the Lithuanian capital Another summer university is organised with the University of Potsdam and the State University of Belarus since 2011 in Minsk.

Since 2014, the University of Paris Ouest-Nanterre-La Défense and the University of Münster (Germany) works together with, among others, the Ss. Cyril and Methodius University (Macedonia), the University of Pristina (Kosovo), the University of Podgorica (Montenegro) and the State University of Tirana (Albania) in order to create an itinerant summer university in the Balkans.

=== In Maghreb and Latin America ===
Paris Ouest-Nanterre and Potsdam founded a French-German dialogue with the Maghreb countries in 2013 in Tunis, in cooperation with Tunis-El Manar University (continued in 2014 in Casablanca, Morocco, with the Université Hassan 2, Faculty of Ain Sebaa). They offer students the opportunity to:

- analyze current legal, political, economic and socio-cultural developments in Tunisia and, whenever possible, in other Maghreb countries in the process of rebuilding;
- examine historical experiences of different countries (France, Germany, Maghreb countries) in the fields mentioned above through a multidisciplinary approach in order to highlight similarities and converging points that could support the discussion about the most appropriate public policies for the situation in the Maghreb;
- broaden the debate to the Mediterranean region that is at the crossroads of European and North African rights, and in particular to the implementation conditions of a common cooperation framework.

The 2014 Summer University at the University of Hassan II Casablanca (Morocco) was devoted to the theme "Law and Religion − common denominators and possible conflicts between religious norms, state norms and international law".

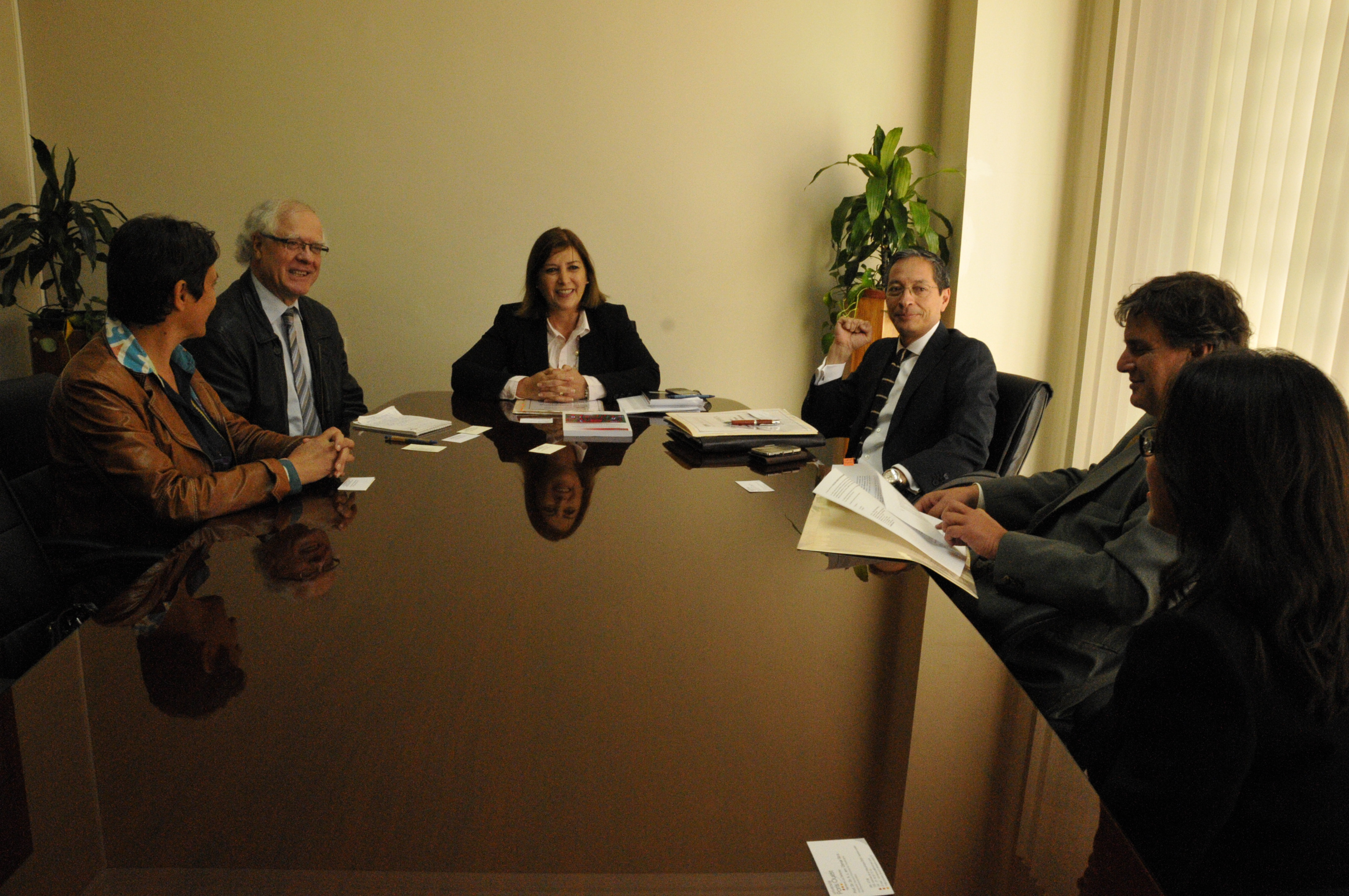
April 29, 2013, in Lima: A meeting of Otmar Seul with Eda A. Rivas Franchini, Minister of Justice of Peru, José Avila Herrera, Vice-Minister of Human Rights and Daniel Frigallo Rivadeneyra, Vice-Minister of Justice.

In 2013 a French-German-Peruvian Summer University about “Democracy and the State of Law” was created at the Pontificia Universidad Catolica del Peru in Lima.

== Research on industrial democracy and the participation of employees in Europe ==
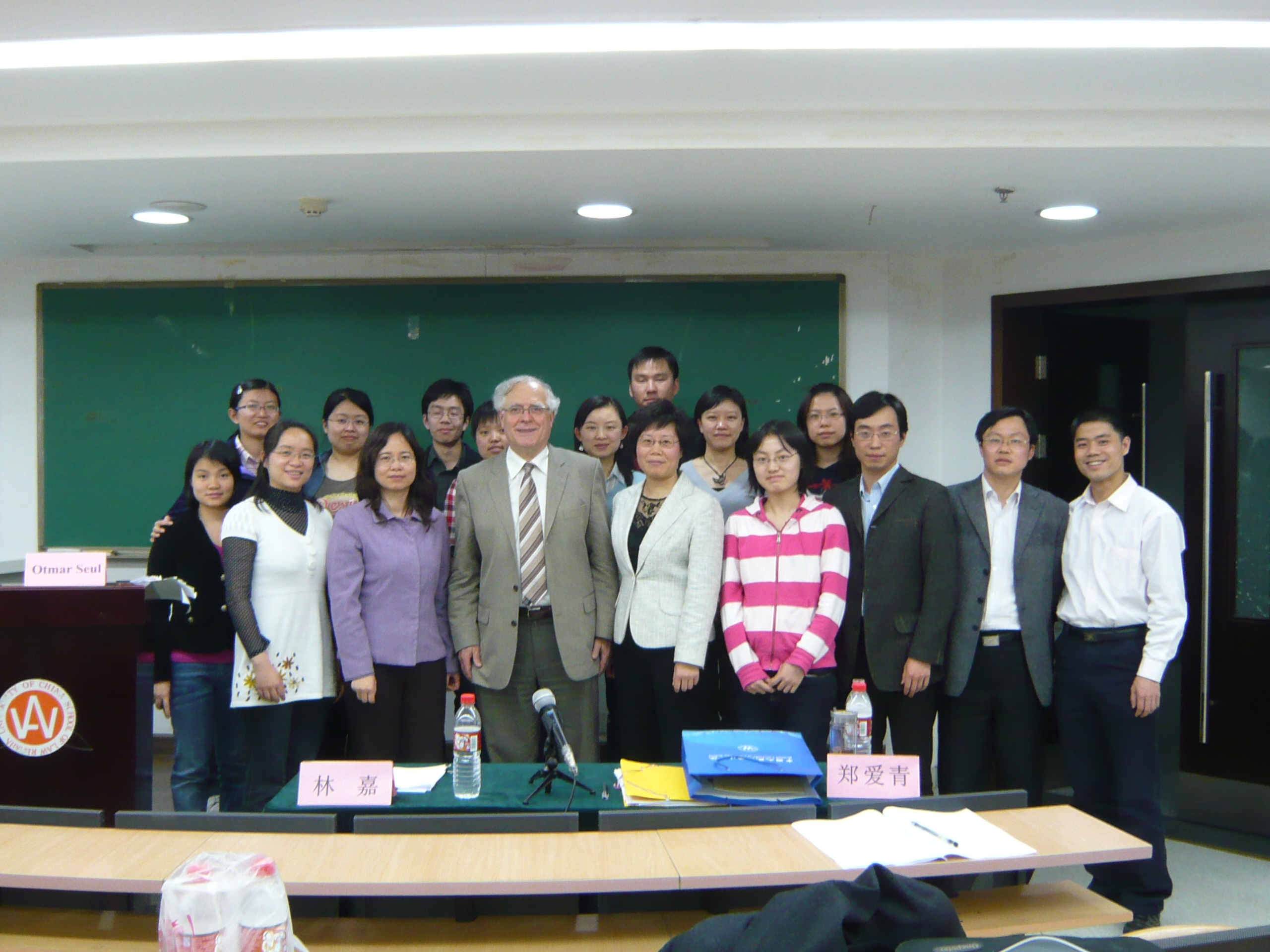
Beijing, at the People's University of China (RENMIN), April 14, 2009: with the professors Jia Lin, Assistant Dean of the Law Faculty, Aiqing Zheng and a group of young researchers having followed the doctoral seminar by Professor Seul.

In his thesis about the consideration by French unions of “workers’ right to direct expression” introduced by the Auroux acts in France, republished in 2012 - with the title Arbeitnehmerpartizipation im Urteil der französischen Gewerkschaften: Sozialreformen unter der Präsidentschaft François Mitterrands (1982-1985) - he explained the interest of West German research in the French corporate reform by the negative results of the German co-management system regarding participation in the workplace. The transposition of the idea of industrial democracy in social legislation and the practice of social dialogue in France, Germany and other EU countries is the main topic of Otmar Seul's work. “The direct participation of workers in company decisions in France and Germany: theories, rights and practices”, his book published in 2011, is an overview of his academic activities between 1968 and 2000 (of which he presented the results officially in 1998 (HDR) in order to obtain the authorization to conduct researches at the University of Paris Ouest-Nanterre–La Défense).

Upon his arrival in France in 1971, Otmar Seul joined a research group about self-management at the School for Advanced Studies in Social Sciences (EHESS).

Otmar Seul is the founder (1994) and director of the collection Legal German/ Languages and European legal and political cultures, edited by the French-German program of legal sciences at the University of Paris Ouest-Nanterre–La Défense. He is also the co-founder and co-director (2010) of the collection Legal and political cultures published by Peter Lang in Bern, Berlin, Frankfurt a. M., New York, Oxford, Vienna, in collaboration with Stephanie Dijoux, his successor as co-director of the integrated curricula in Paris-Ouest and Potsdam.

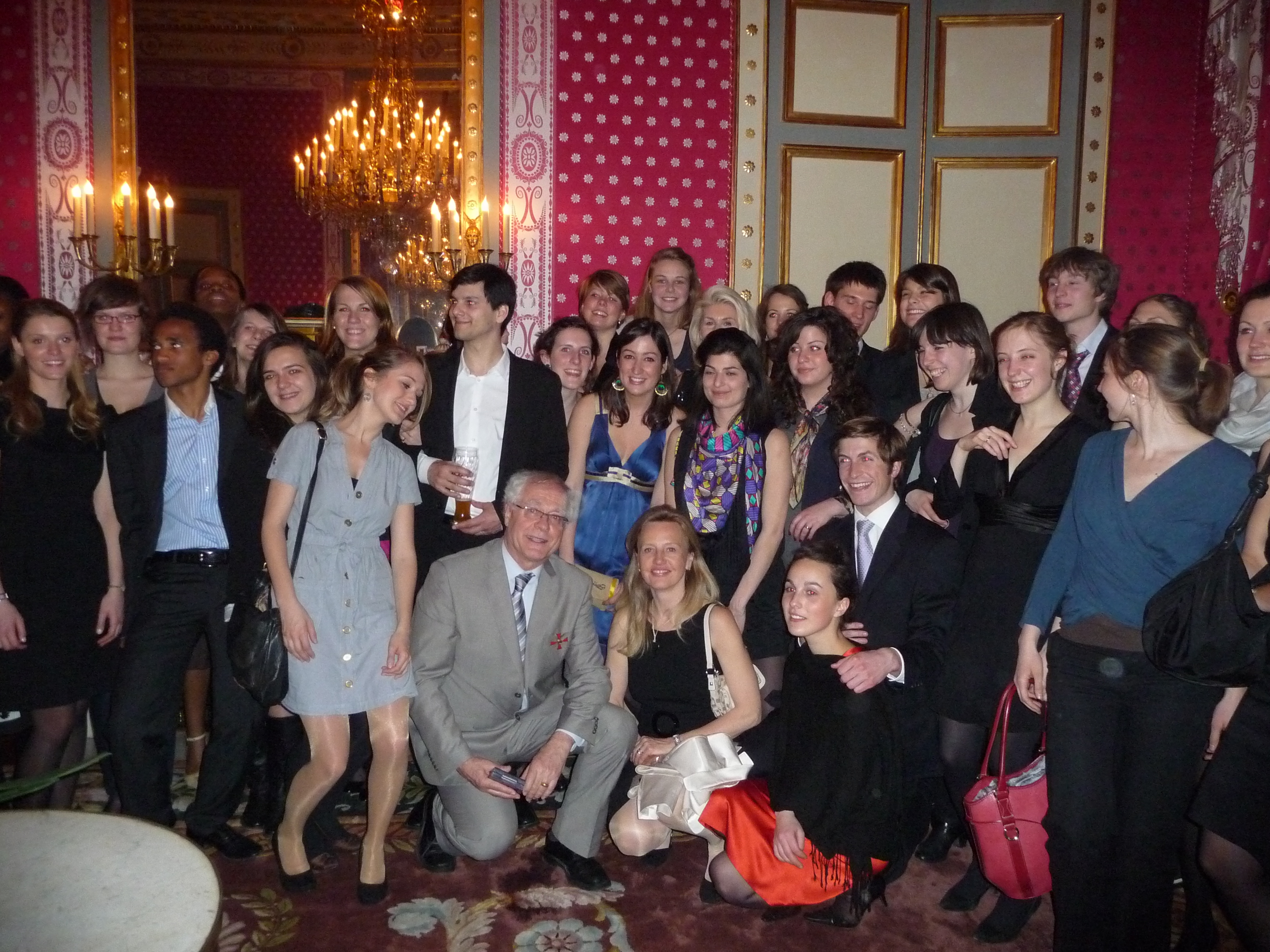
March 18, 2010: Reception of the German Ambassador in Paris, a tribute to Otmar Seul's work in the setting of the French-German curriculum.

== Works ==
Selected works by Suel:

Otmar Seul, Kaïs Slama, Kerstin Peglow (Hrsg.): Kulturvermittlung und Interkulturalität. Ein deutsch-französisch-tunesischer Dialog – politische, rechtliche und sozio-linguistische Aspekte, P.I.E. Peter Lang-Éditions scientifiques internationales Brüssel, Bern, Berlin, Frankfurt a.M., New York, Oxford, Wien 2016, 320 pages;

Arbeitnehmerpartizipation im Urteil der französischen Gewerkschaften: Sozialreformen unter der Präsidentschaft François Mitterrands (1982-1985), Südwestdeutscher Verlag für Hochschulschriften, Saarbrücken 2012 (thesis republication 1986), 530 pages;

La solidarité dans l’Union européenne / Solidarität in der Europäischen Union, Ed. Peter Lang Bern, Berlin, Frankfurt s. M., New York, Oxford, Vienna 2012, 294 pages;

La participation directe des salariés aux décisions dans l’entreprise en France et en Allemagne : théories, droits et pratiques 1970-2000, Editions universitaires européennes, Sarrebruck 2011, 122 pages;

L’Europe élargie : la participation des salariés aux décisions dans l’entreprise. Traditions à l’Ouest, innovations à l’Est ? (dir. en coll. avec Peter Jansen), Ed. Peter Lang Bern, Frankfurt, New York, Oxford, Vienna, 2009, 430 pages;

Information, Consultation et Cogestion : droits et pratiques de la participation des salariés aux décisions dans l’entreprise en France et en Allemagne / Unterrichtung, Anhörung und Mitbestimmung: Rechte und Praktiken der Beteiligung der Arbeitnehmer an der Entscheidungsfindung im Unternehmen in Deutschland und Frankreich. (dir. in cooperation with Peter Jansen); no. 15 de la collection Allemand juridique-Langues et cultures juridiques et politiques européennes; publications des formations « Droit allemand » de l’Université Paris Ouest-Nanterre-La Défense, 2008, 235 pages;

Terrorismes : L’Italie et l’Allemagne à l’épreuve des « années de plomb » (1970-1980) : réalités et représentations du terrorisme (dir. in cooperation with Gius Gargiulo), Houdiard-Editeur, Paris 2008, 350 pages;

De la communication interculturelle dans les relations Franco-allemandes : Institutions – Enseignement – Entreprises (dir. in cooperation with Bernd Zielinski et Uta Dupuy), Ed. Peter Lang, Bern, Frankfurt, New York, Oxford, Vienna, 2003, 344 pages;

Les nouveaux Länder dans le processus d’unification (dir.), Actes des 2èmes et 4èmes Rencontres Franco-allemandes de Nanterre sur l’Allemagne unifiée, Editions Chlorofeuilles, Nanterre 2000, 2 volumes, 561 pages;

Implications juridiques et politiques de l’unification allemande (dir.), textes choisis des 1ères Journées d’information sur l’Allemagne unifiée, Editions Chlorofeuilles (Collection L’Allemagne unifiée), Nanterre 1998, 184 pages;

Démarches participatives et travail en groupe : l’impact du modèle japonais sur l’organisation du travail et les relations de travail en France et en Allemagne (dir.), Editions Chlorofeuilles (Collection La France et l’Allemagne en Europe), Nanterre 1998, 441 pages;

Participation par délégation et participation directe des salariés dans l’entreprise. Aspects juridiques et socio-économiques de la modernisation des relations industrielles en Allemagne, en France et dans d’autres pays de l’Union européenne (dir.), Editions Chlorofeuilles (Collection La France et l’Allemagne en Europe ), Nanterre 1994, 365 pages;

Das Arbeitermitspracherecht und andere neue Arbeitnehmerrechte in Frankreich aus der Sicht der französischen Gewerkschaften. Theoretische Vorstellungen und Reformpraxis (1982-1985), Dissertationsdruck Universität Oldenburg 1988, 613 pages + appendix;

Gewerkschaften in Frankreich : Geschichte, Organisation und Programmatik (in cooperation with Peter Jansen, Leo Kißler, Peter Kühne, Claus Leggewie), Editions Campus (Deutsch-französische Studien zur Industriegesellschaft), volume 2, Frankfurt and New York 1986, 288 pages;

Recherches sur l’autogestion, autogestion de la recherche : histoire et sociologie de la Seconde Conférence internationale sur l’Autogestion (dir. in cooperation with Yvon Bourdet, Olivier Corpet, Jacqueline Pluet, et al.), nos. 41-42 d’Autogestion et Socialisme, Ed. Anthropos, Paris, 1978, 311 pages.

== Liber Amicorum Otmar Seul ==
Bezzenberger, Tilman; Gruber, Joachim; Rohlfing-Dijoux, Stephanie : Die deutsch-französischen Rechtsbeziehungen, Europa und die Welt / Les relations juridiques Franco-allemandes, l'Europe et le monde. Liber amicorum Otmar Seul, Nomos Verlag, Baden Baden, 2014, 570 pages.

== See also ==
- Interview donnée par le Professeur Otmar Seul à l'ACFA (Association des diplômés des cursus franco-allemands en droit Paris Ouest/Potsdam), le 16 mai 2013
- «Le professeur Otmar Seul reçoit la croix d’Officier de l’Ordre du Mérite» sur paris.diplo.de
- Site des formations franco-allemandes et européennes de l'Université Paris Ouest
