= Newel, Germany =

Newel
- Municipality
- Coat of arms

- Location of Newel within Trier-Saarburg district
- Interactive map of Newel
- Location within Germany Location within Rhineland-Palatinate
- Coordinates: 49°48′52″N 6°35′01″E
- Country: Germany
- State: Rhineland-Palatinate
- District: Trier-Saarburg
- Municipal assoc.: Trier-Land
- Subdivisions: 4

Government
  - Mayor (2019–24): Uwe Metzdorf

Area
  - Total: 16.65 km^{2} (6.43 sq mi)
- Elevation: 365 m (1,198 ft)

Population (2025-12-31)
  - Total: 2,627
  - Density: 157.8/km^{2} (408.6/sq mi)
- Time zone: UTC+01:00 (CET)
  - Summer (DST): UTC+02:00 (CEST)
- Postal codes: 54309
- Dialling codes: 06505
- Vehicle registration: TR
- Website: www.gemeinde-newel.de

Newel is a municipality in the Trier-Saarburg district, in Rhineland-Palatinate, Germany.
