= Basilica of Constantine =

Basilica of Constantine can refer to:

- Basilica of Maxentius and Constantine in Rome
- Basilica of Constantine in Trier, Germany
