= Roman Monuments, Cathedral of St Peter and Church of Our Lady in Trier =

UNESCO World Heritage Site in Rhineland-Palatinate, Germany

UNESCO World Heritage Site
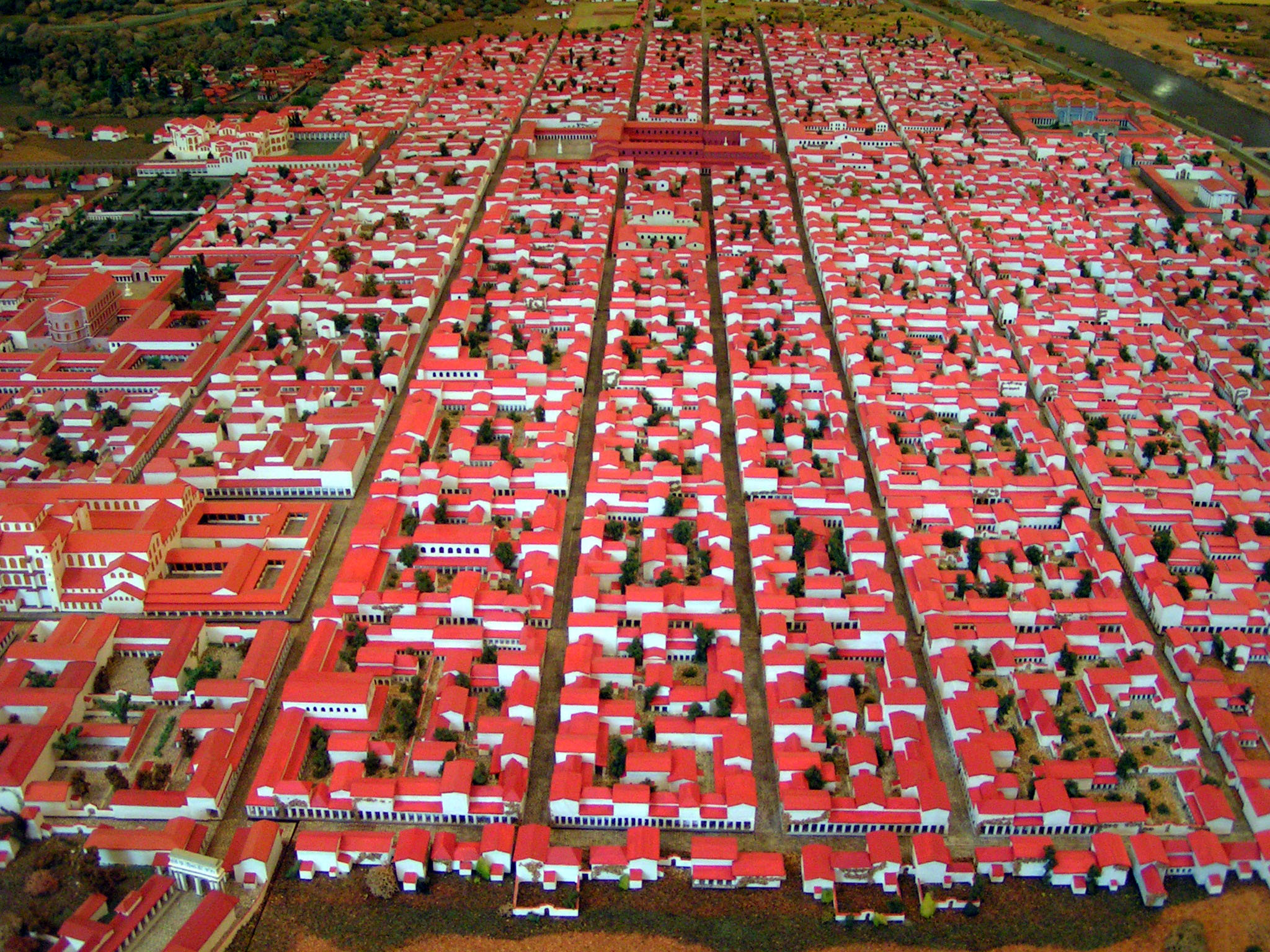
- Augusta Treverorum

- Location within Germany Location within Rhineland-Palatinate
- Location: Trier, Rhineland-Palatinate, Germany#Amphitheatre
- Includes: 1. Moselle Bridge; 2. Barbara Baths; 3. Igel Column; 4. Porta Nigra; 5. Imperial Baths; 6. Aula Palatina (Basilica); 7. Cathedral; 8. Church of Our Lady (Liebfrauenkirche)
- Criteria: Cultural: (i), (iii), (iv), (vi)
- Reference: 367
- Inscription: 1986 (10th Session)
- Coordinates: 49°45′N 6°38′E

The Roman Monuments, Cathedral of St. Peter and Church of Our Lady in Trier are buildings and monuments of particular historical importance in Trier, Germany, that were together listed as a UNESCO World Heritage Site in 1986. These sites demonstrate the political, economic, and historical importance of Trier during the Roman Empire as one of the four capital during the Tetrarchy period, and as a prominent city during the early days of the Holy Roman Empire in the Middle Ages.

From UNESCO/CLT/WHC:

"Trier is an example of a large Roman capital after the division of the empire. The remains of the Imperial Palace, in addition to the Aula Palatina and the Imperial Thermae, are impressive in their dimensions. The city bears exceptional testimony to Roman civilization owing to the density and the quality of the monuments preserved: the bridge, the remains of the fortified wall, thermae, amphitheatre, storehouses, etc. In particular, funerary art and the craftsmanship of potters, glassworkers, and moneyers flourished in the city."

In 2009, the site was featured on a golden 100-Euro coin.

== Constituent sites ==
Nine locations in Trier are listed as part of the World Heritage Site:

1. Amphitheatre, built in the mid-2nd century and accommodating up to 20,000 people
2. Moselle Bridge:
3. Barbara Baths
4. Igel Column: a burial monument erected in the 3rd century
5. Porta Nigra: the northern gate to the Roman city
6. Imperial Baths: incomplete baths that were constructed in the 4th century.
7. Aula Palatina (Basilica): An early Christian basilica built in the early 4th century.
8. Cathedral: The oldest church in Germany
9. Church of Our Lady (Liebfrauenkirche): A Gothic church built in the 13th century.

== Gallery ==
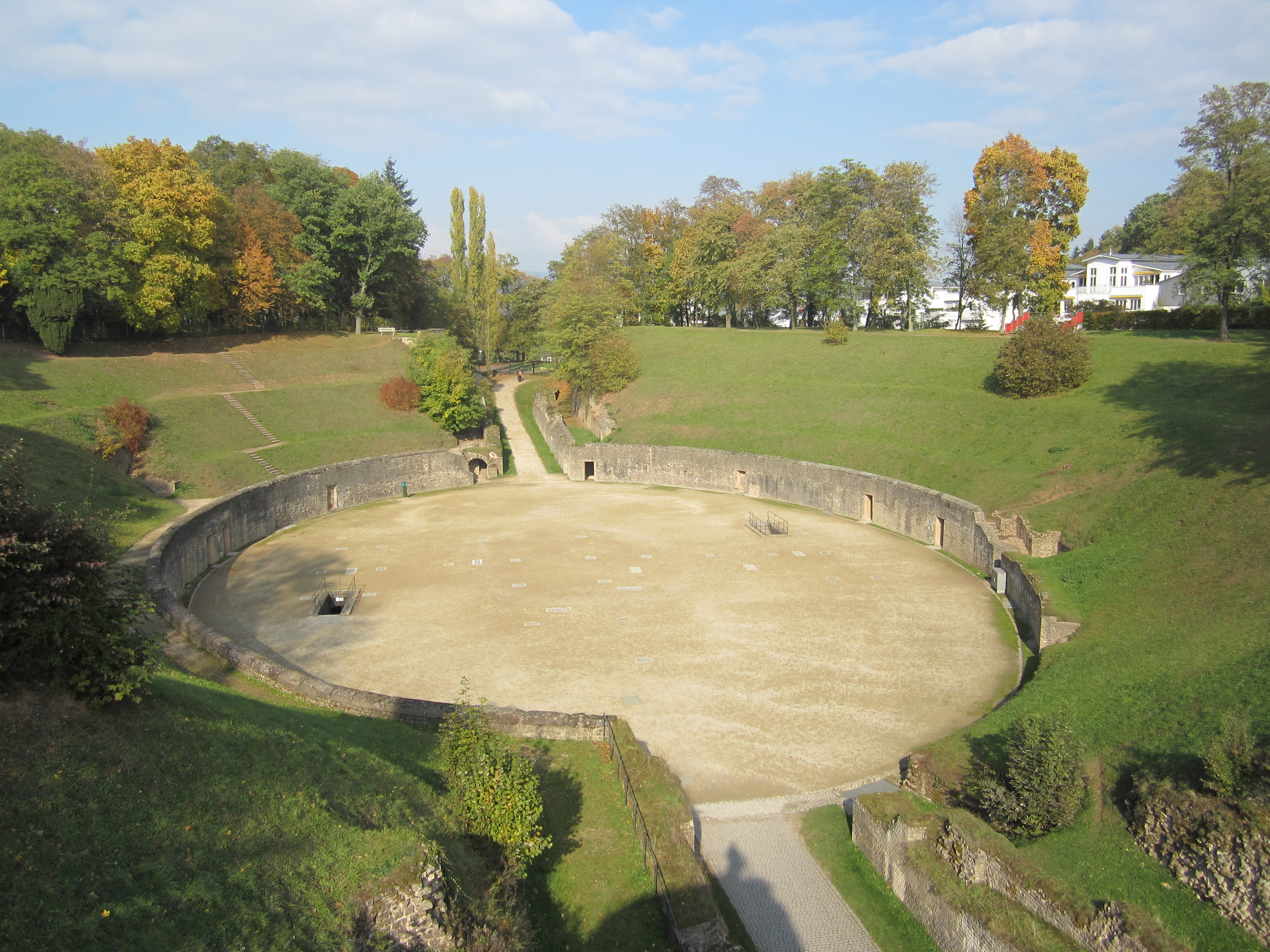
Trier Roman Amphitheatre

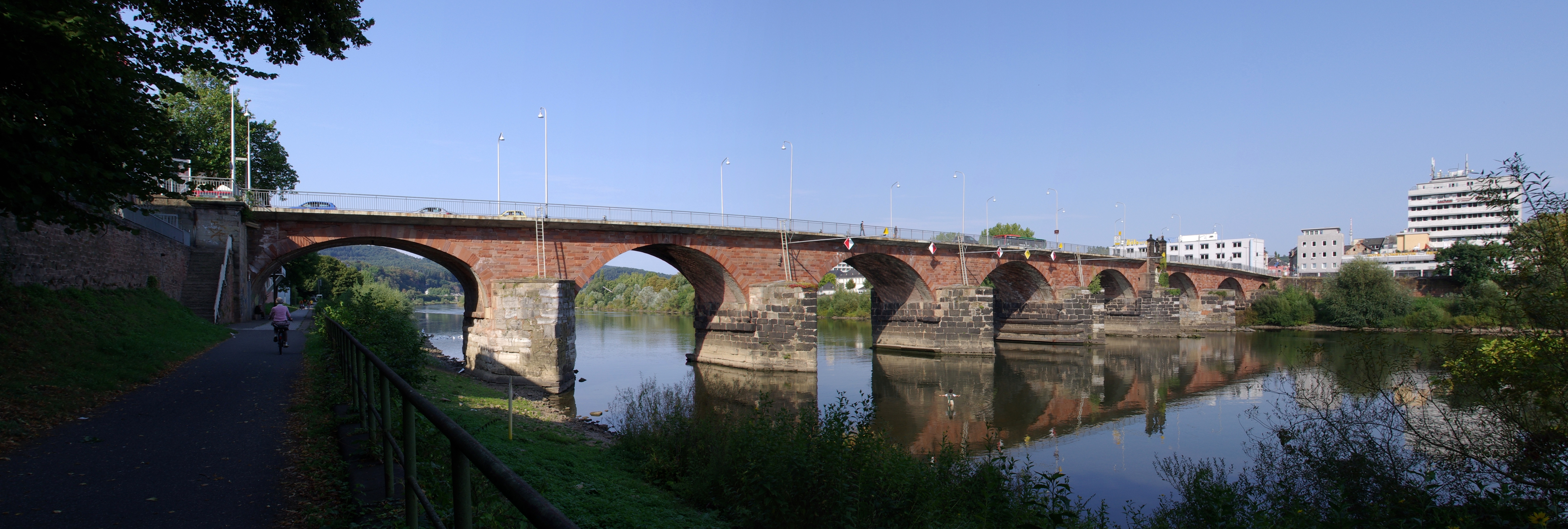
Trier Roman Bridge

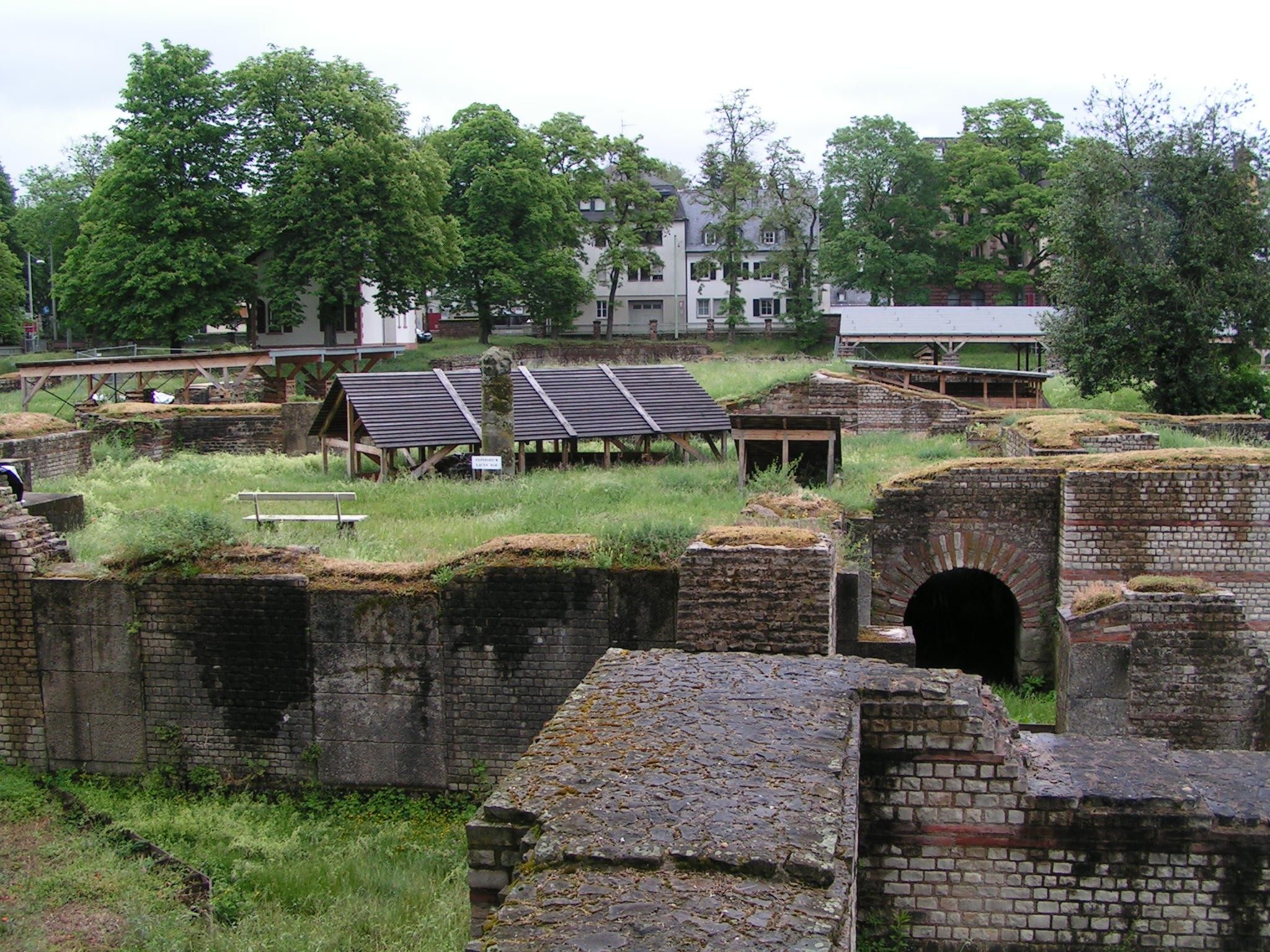
Trier Barbara Baths

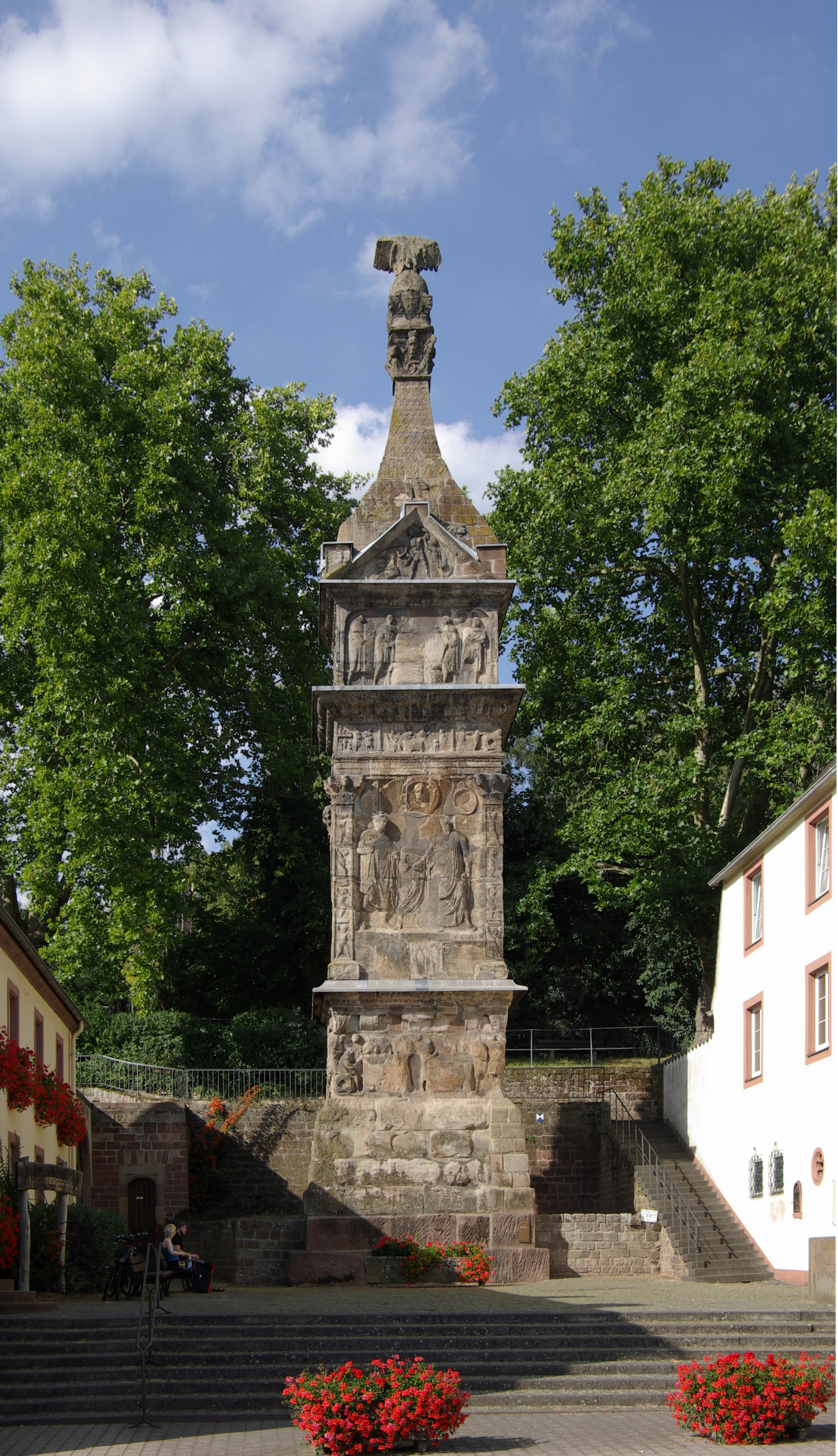
Igel Column

Trier Porta Nigra

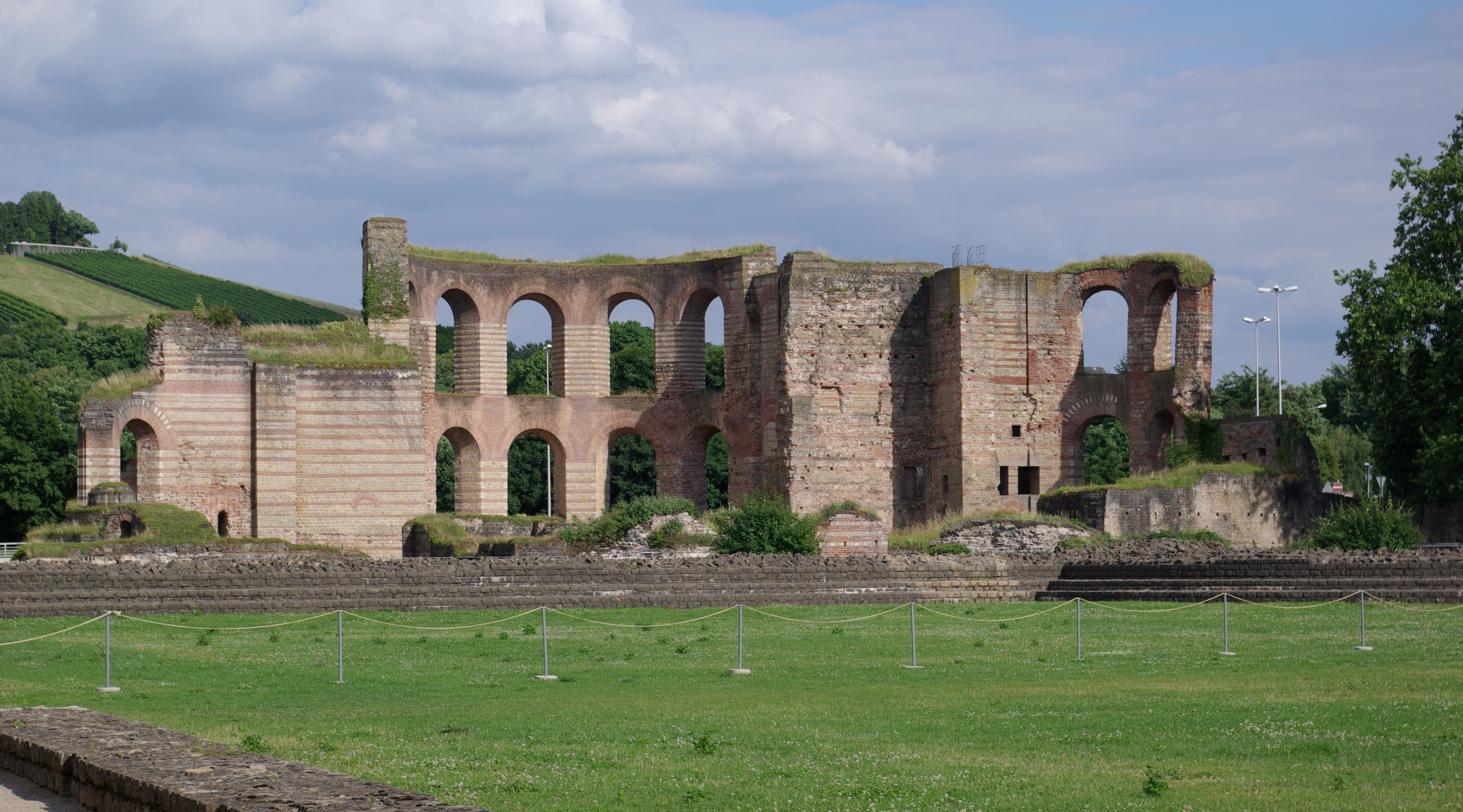
Trier Imperial Baths

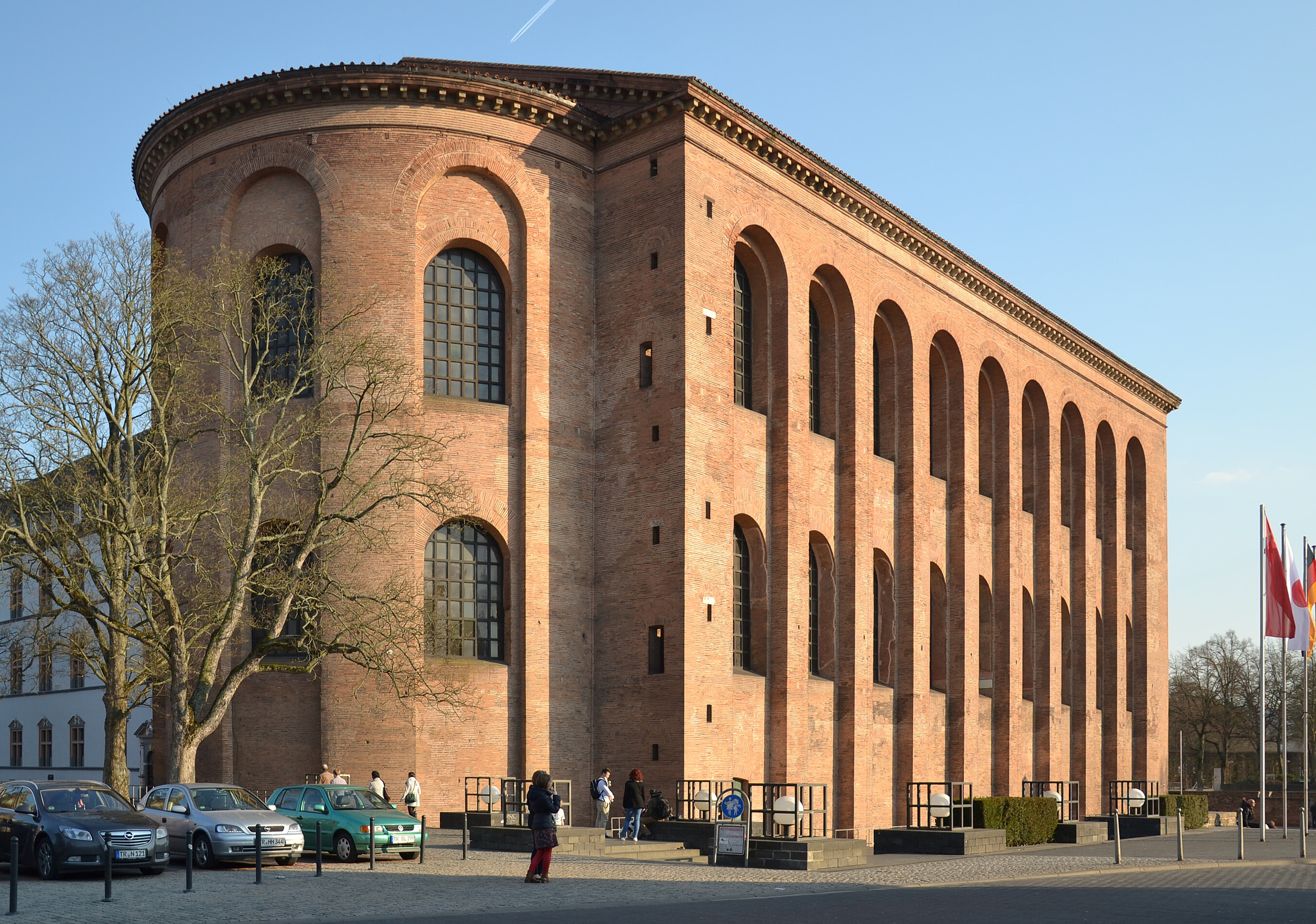
Trier Basilica of Constantine

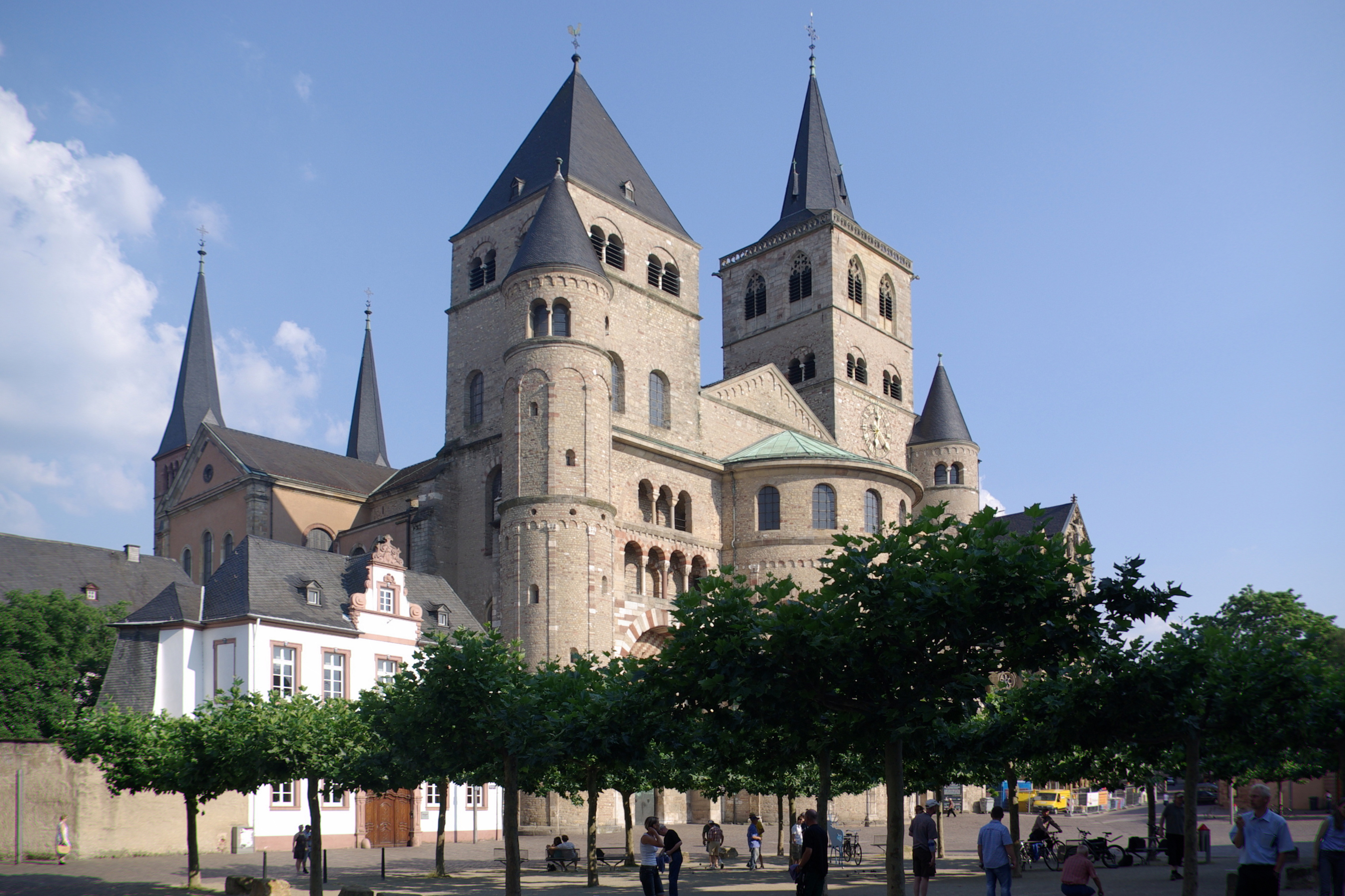
Trier Cathedral

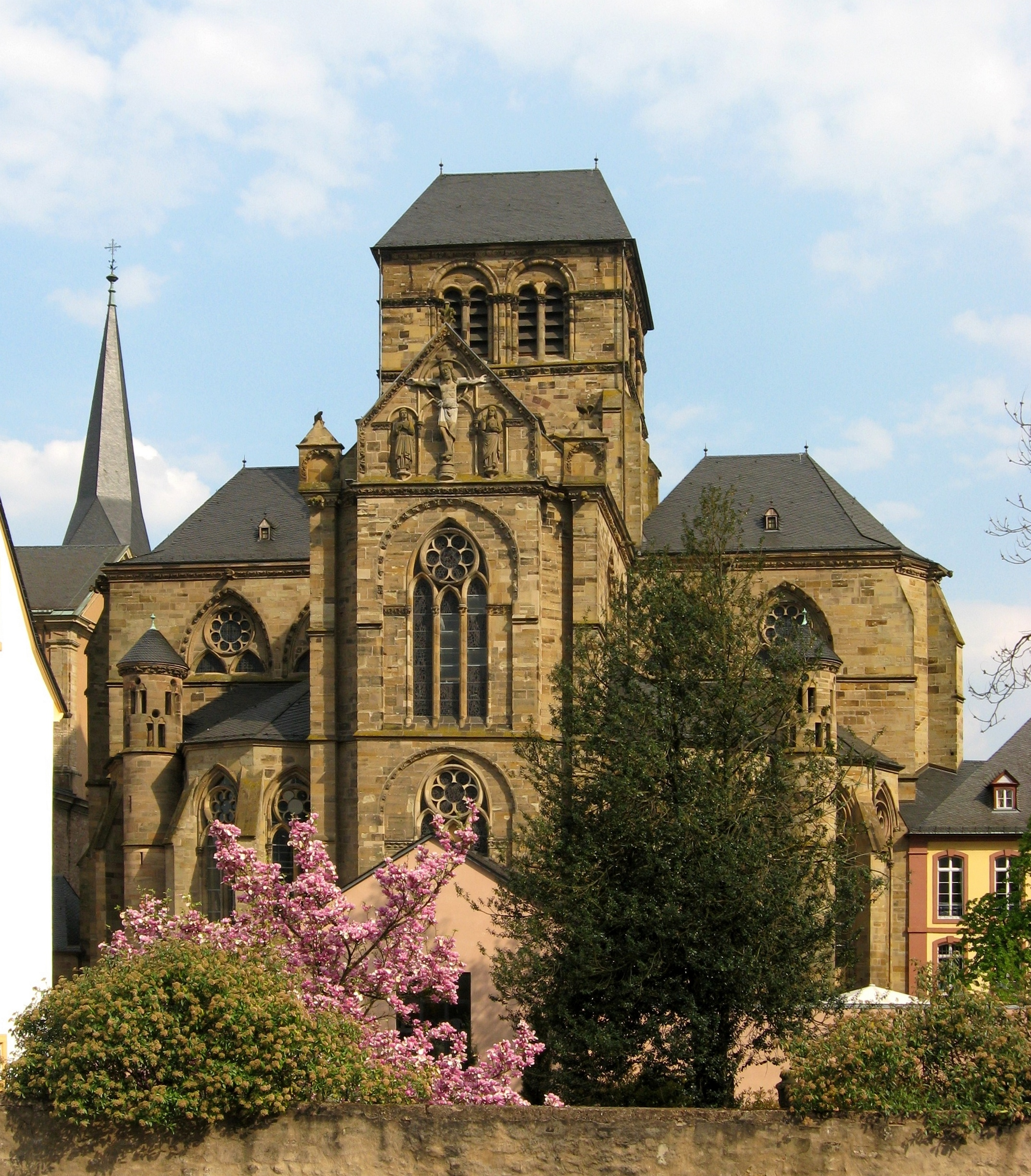
Trier Liebfrauenkirche

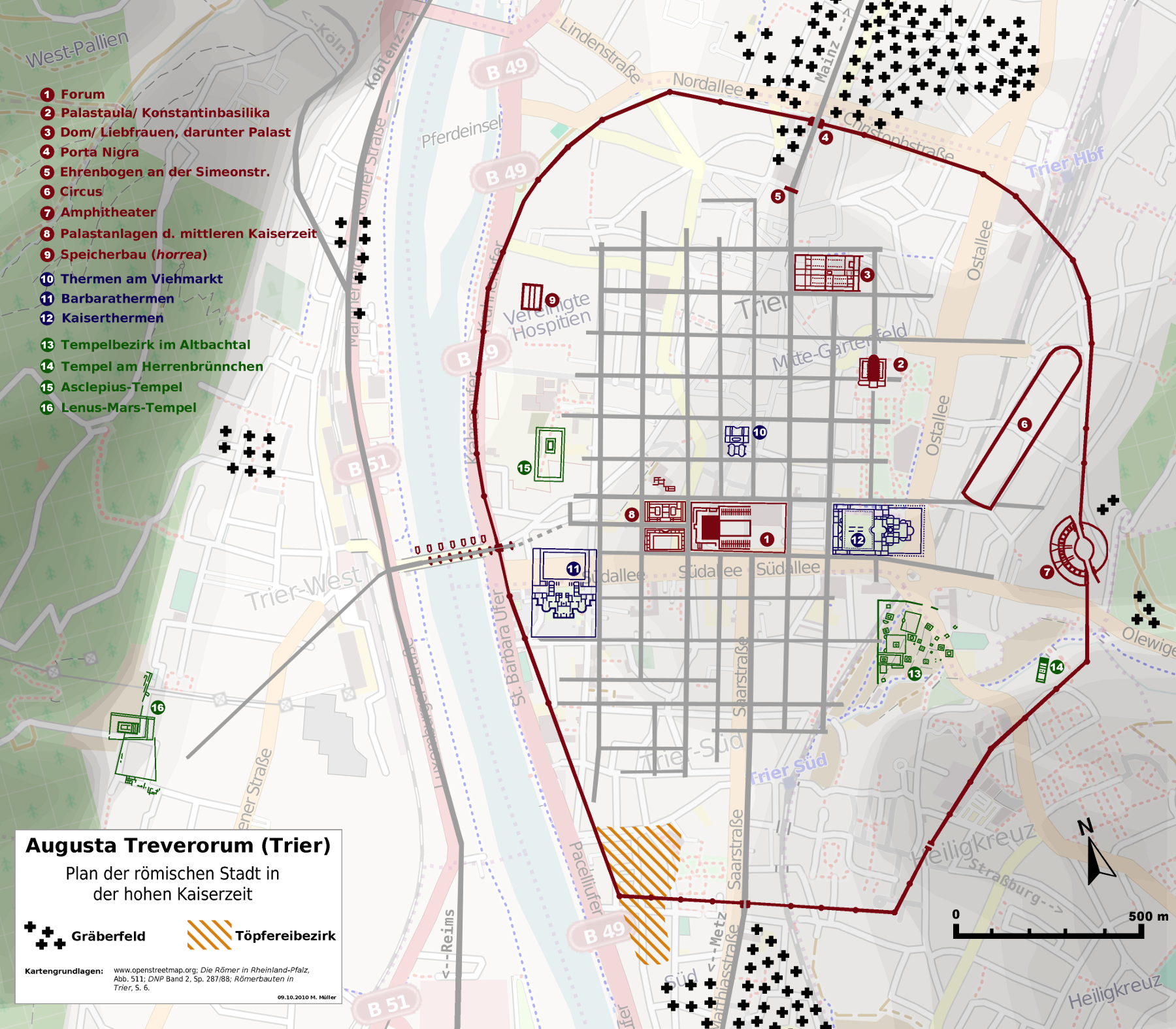
Augusta Treverorum City Plan
