= CLTS =

CLTS may refer to:

- Center for Transnational Legal Studies, London
- Community-led total sanitation, a hygiene approach
- Concordia Lutheran Theological Seminary, St. Catherine's, Ontario, Canada

== See also ==
CLT (disambiguation)
