= CLT =

CLT, Clt, or clt may refer to:

== Businesses and organizations ==
- Canadian Learning Television, a former name of Oprah Winfrey Network
- Capitol Land Trust, Washington, USA
- Compagnie Luxembourgeoise de Radiodiffusion, later RTL Group, Luxembourg media company
- Culture Commission or "CLT Commission" affiliated with UNESCO

== Education ==
- Classic Learning Test, an American standardized test
- Cognitive load theory, in pedagogical psychology
- Communicative language teaching, an approach

== Law ==
- Charitable lead trust, a form of charitable trust in the United States
- Community land trust, a housing model
- Consolidation of Labor Laws, a 1943 Brazilian law (Portuguese: Consolidação das Leis do Trabalho)

== Medicine ==
- Chronic lymphocytic thyroiditis, an autoimmune disease
- Clinical Laboratory Technologist, a healthcare professional
- Clot lysis time, a result of the OHP test for blood clots

== Transport ==
- Charlotte Douglas International Airport, North Carolina, US (IATA:CLT)
- Cilebut railway station, Indonesia
- Clacton-on-Sea railway station, Clacton on Sea, UK
- Kozhikode railway station, Kerala, India

== Science, technology and mathematics ==
- Central limit theorem, in probability and statistics
- Construal level theory, a statistical social theory
- Central location test, a marketing research technique
- Cross-laminated timber, an engineered wood

== Other uses ==
- Chile Standard Time, a time zone (UTC−4)
- Charlotte, North Carolina
