= Igel Column =

UNESCO World Heritage Site
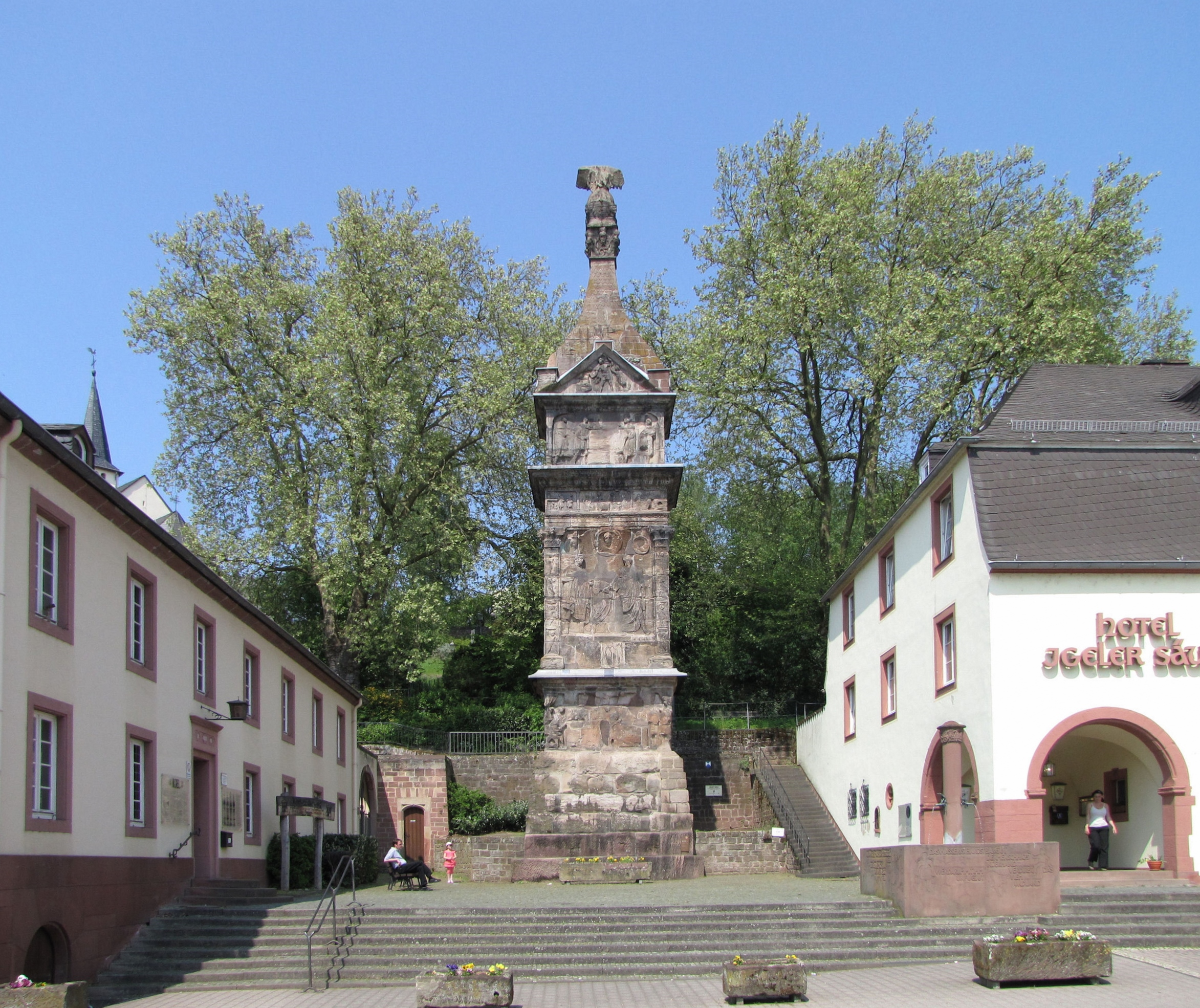

- Location within Germany Location within Rhineland-Palatinate
- Location: Igel, Trier, Rhineland-Palatinate, Germany
- Part of: Roman Monuments, Cathedral of St Peter and Church of Our Lady in Trier
- Criteria: Cultural: (i), (iii), (iv), (vi)
- Reference: 367-004
- Inscription: 1986 (10th Session)
- Coordinates: 49°42′33″N 6°32′58″E

The Igel Column (German: Igeler Säule) is a multi-storeyed Roman sandstone column in the municipality of Igel, Trier, Germany, dated to c. 250 AD. The column is the burial monument of the Secundinii cloth merchant family, and was built by two of the family members, Lucius Secundinius Aventinus and Lucius Secundinus Securus.

Measuring 23 metres (75 ft) in height, it is crowned by the sculptural group of Jupiter and Ganymede. The column includes a four-stepped base, a relatively low podium, topped by a projecting cornice, a storey, its flat Corinthian pilasters with decorated shafts, supporting an architrave, a sculptured frieze and a heavy cornice. The bas-reliefs feature a procession of six coloni, bringing various donations to the house of their master. The coloni are received before the entrance to the atrium. The donations consist of a hare, two fish, a kid, an eel, a rooster and a basket of fruit. The column is made out of red and red-grey sandstone but was originally painted.

Because of its testimony to the importance of Trier during Roman times, the Igel Column was designated as part of the UNESCO World Heritage Site Roman Monuments, Cathedral of St. Peter and Church of Our Lady in Trier in 1986. It has been represented numerous times in paintings and drawings. A polychromed replica dominates the central courtyard of the Rheinisches Landesmuseum Trier.

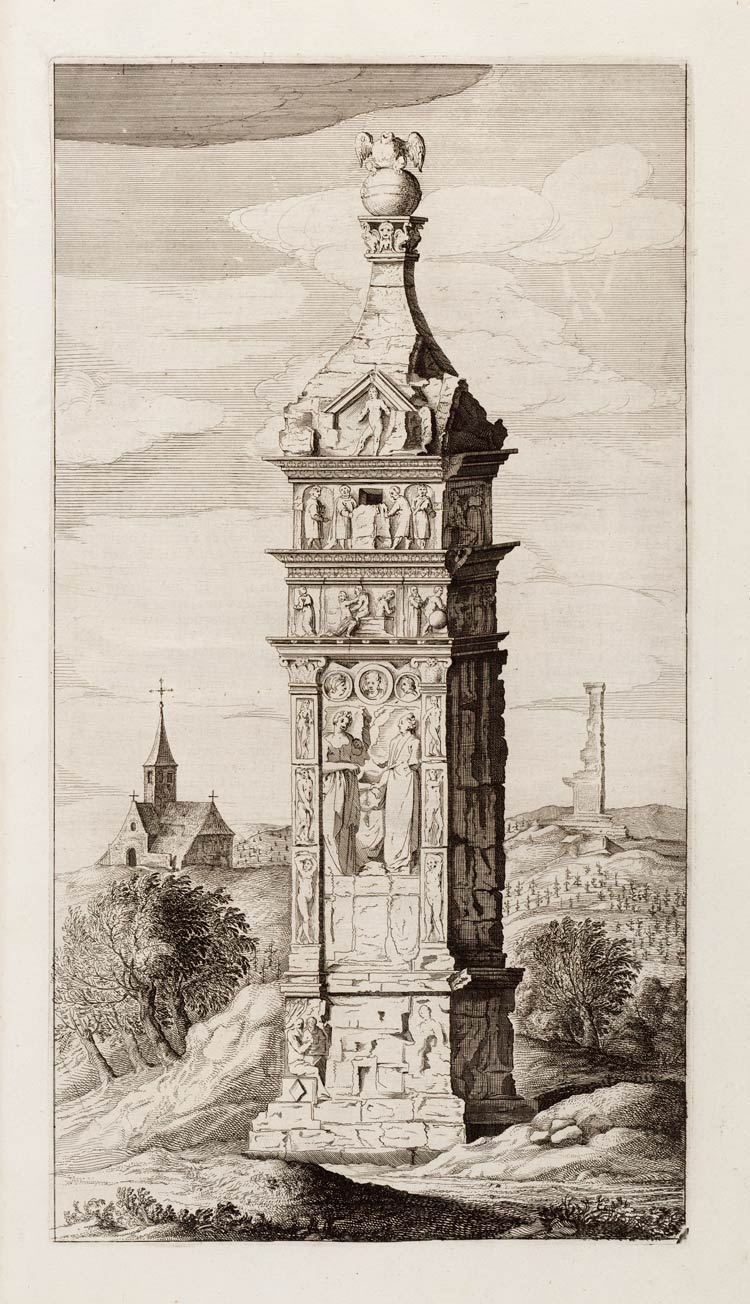
Joan Blaeu, 1649

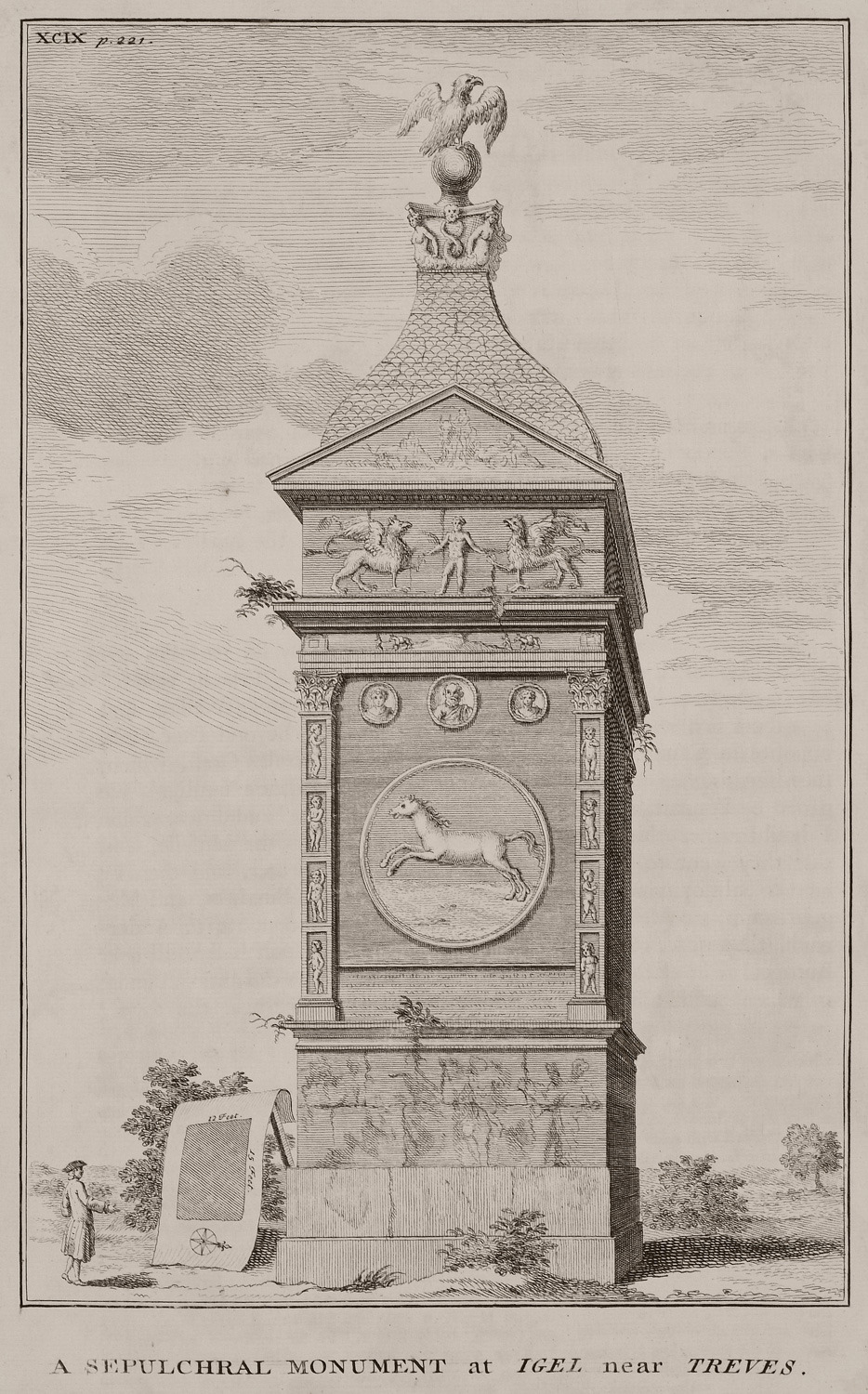
Richard Pococke, 1745

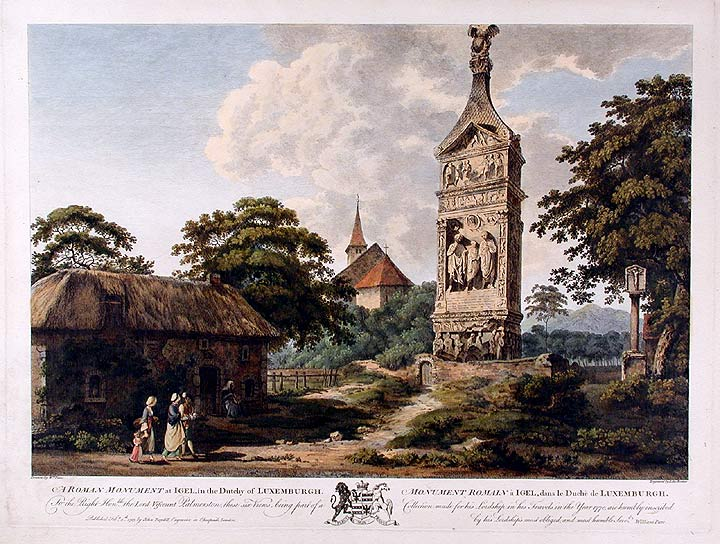
Engraving by William Pars, 1783

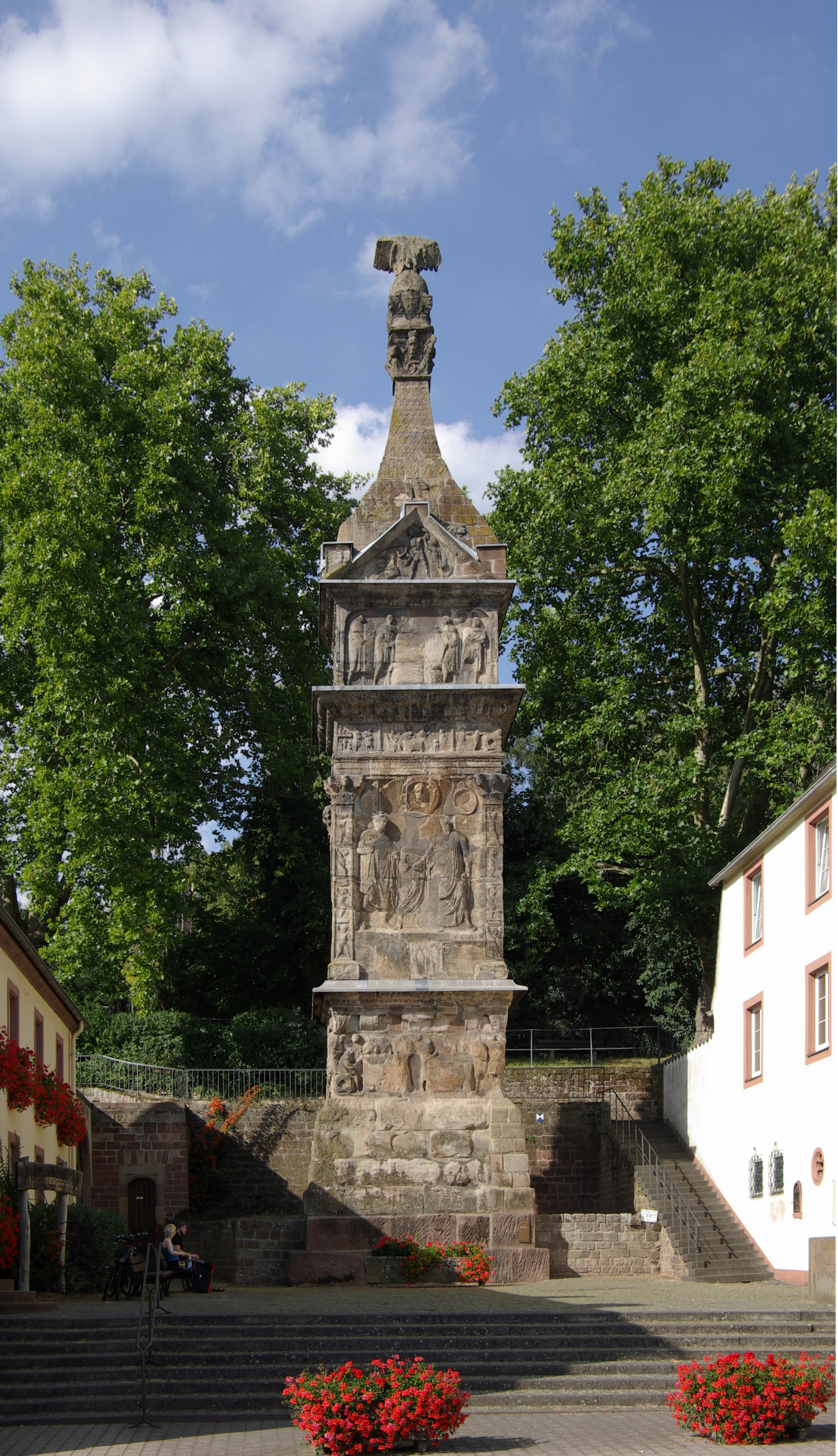

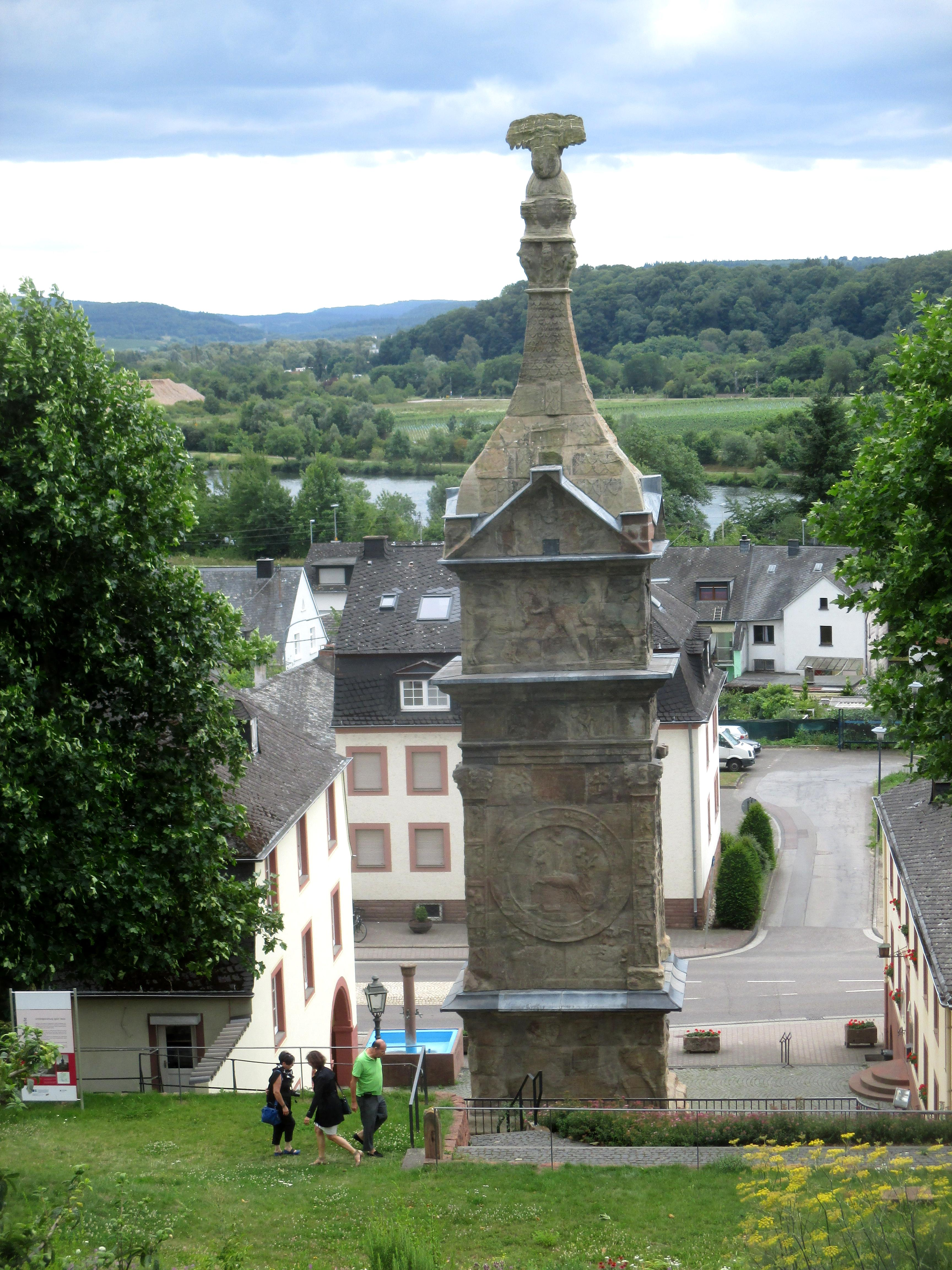
Back of the column

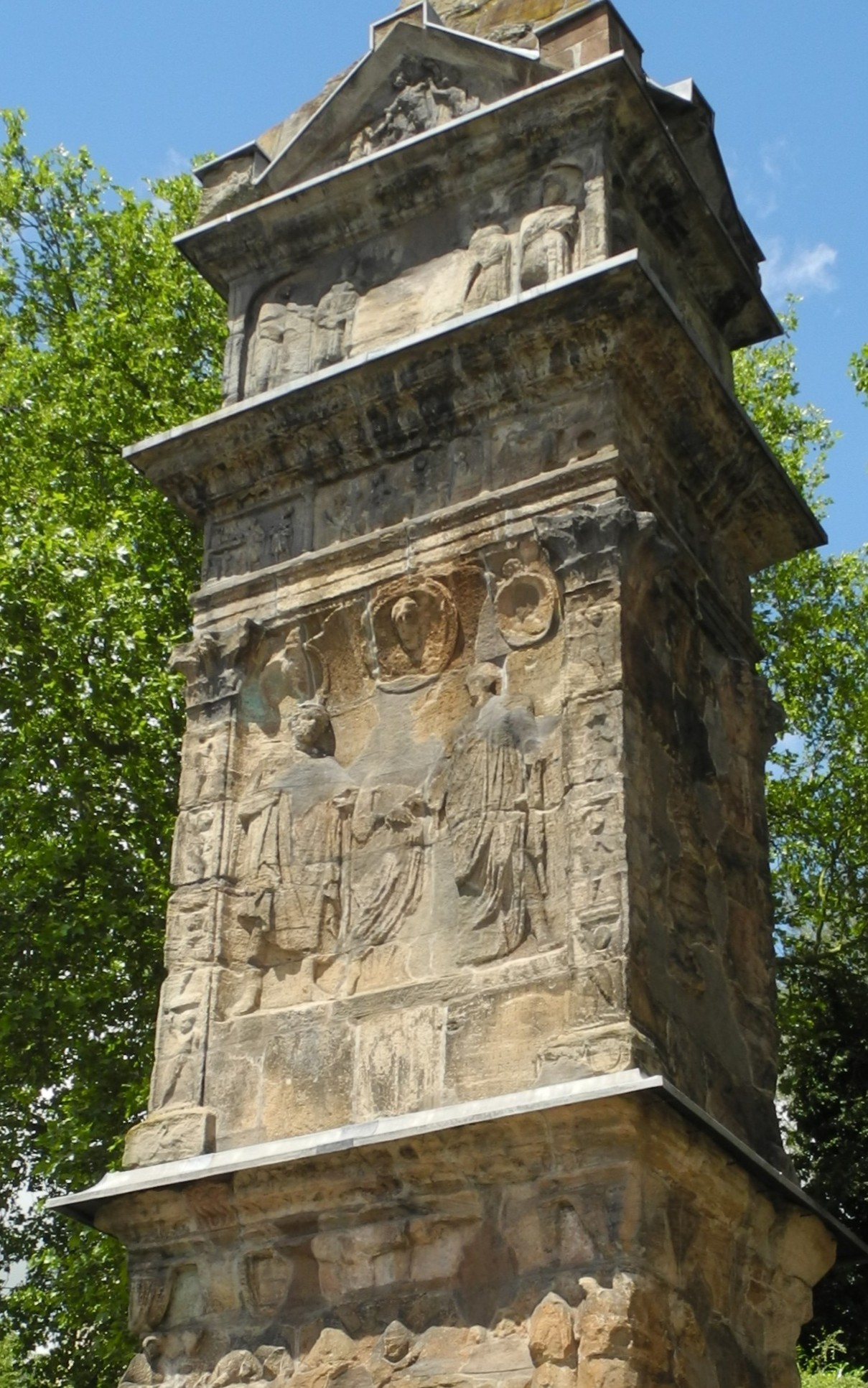
Central relief

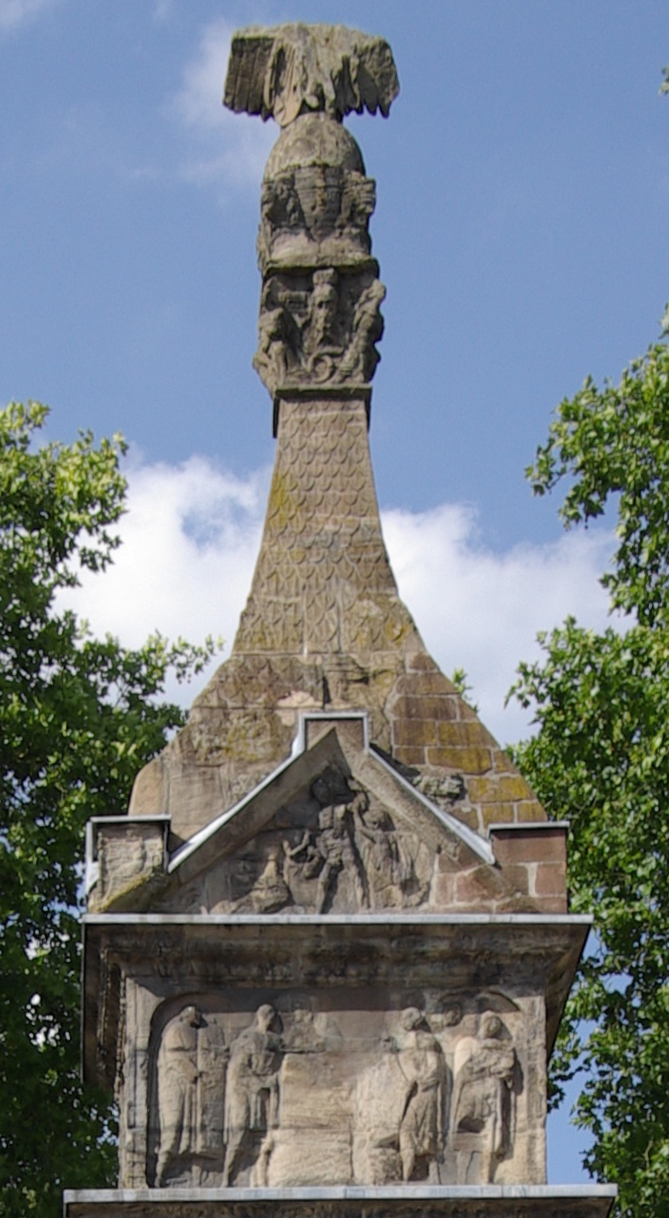
Detail top

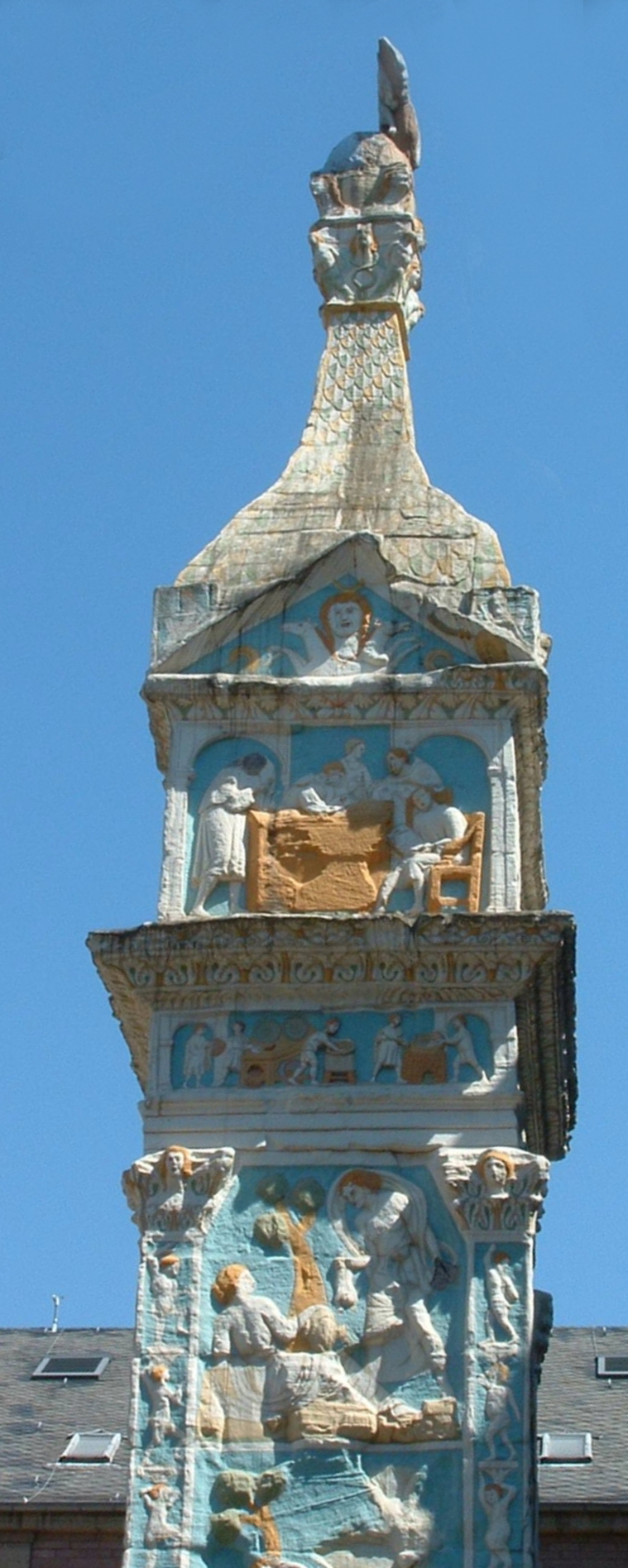
Polychromed replica in the Rheinisches Landesmuseum Trier
