= Igel =

- Municipality
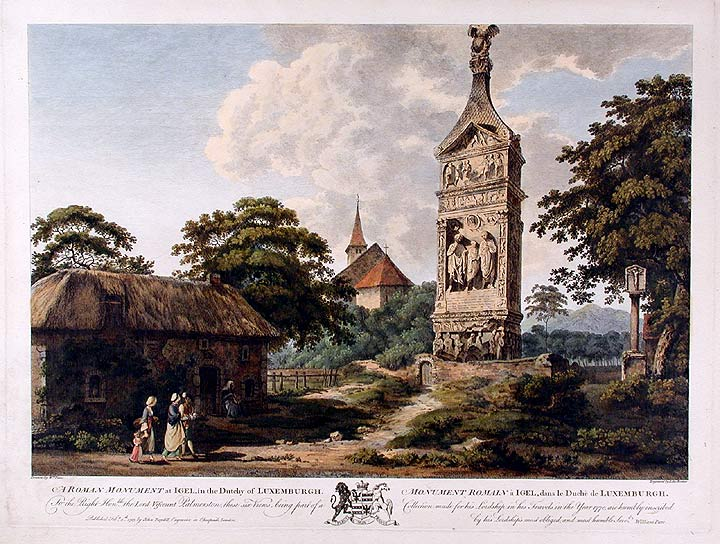
- A Roman Monument at Igel, coloured engraving published by John Boydell from a painting by Edward Rooker

- Coat of arms

- Location of Igel within Trier-Saarburg district
- Interactive map of Igel
- Location within Germany Location within Rhineland-Palatinate
- Coordinates: 49°42′36″N 6°32′53″E
- Country: Germany
- State: Rhineland-Palatinate
- District: Trier-Saarburg
- Municipal assoc.: Trier-Land

Government
  - Mayor (2019–24): Franz Pauly (CDU)

Area
  - Total: 7.30 km^{2} (2.82 sq mi)
- Elevation: 164 m (538 ft)

Population (2025-12-31)
  - Total: 2,079
  - Density: 285/km^{2} (738/sq mi)
- Time zone: UTC+01:00 (CET)
  - Summer (DST): UTC+02:00 (CEST)
- Postal codes: 54298
- Dialling codes: 06501
- Vehicle registration: TR
- Website: www.gemeinde-igel.de

Igel is a municipality in the Trier-Saarburg district, in Rhineland-Palatinate, Germany. Igel is known for the Igel Column, a 23 m high Roman decorated tomb. The Igel Column is a UNESCO World Heritage Site.

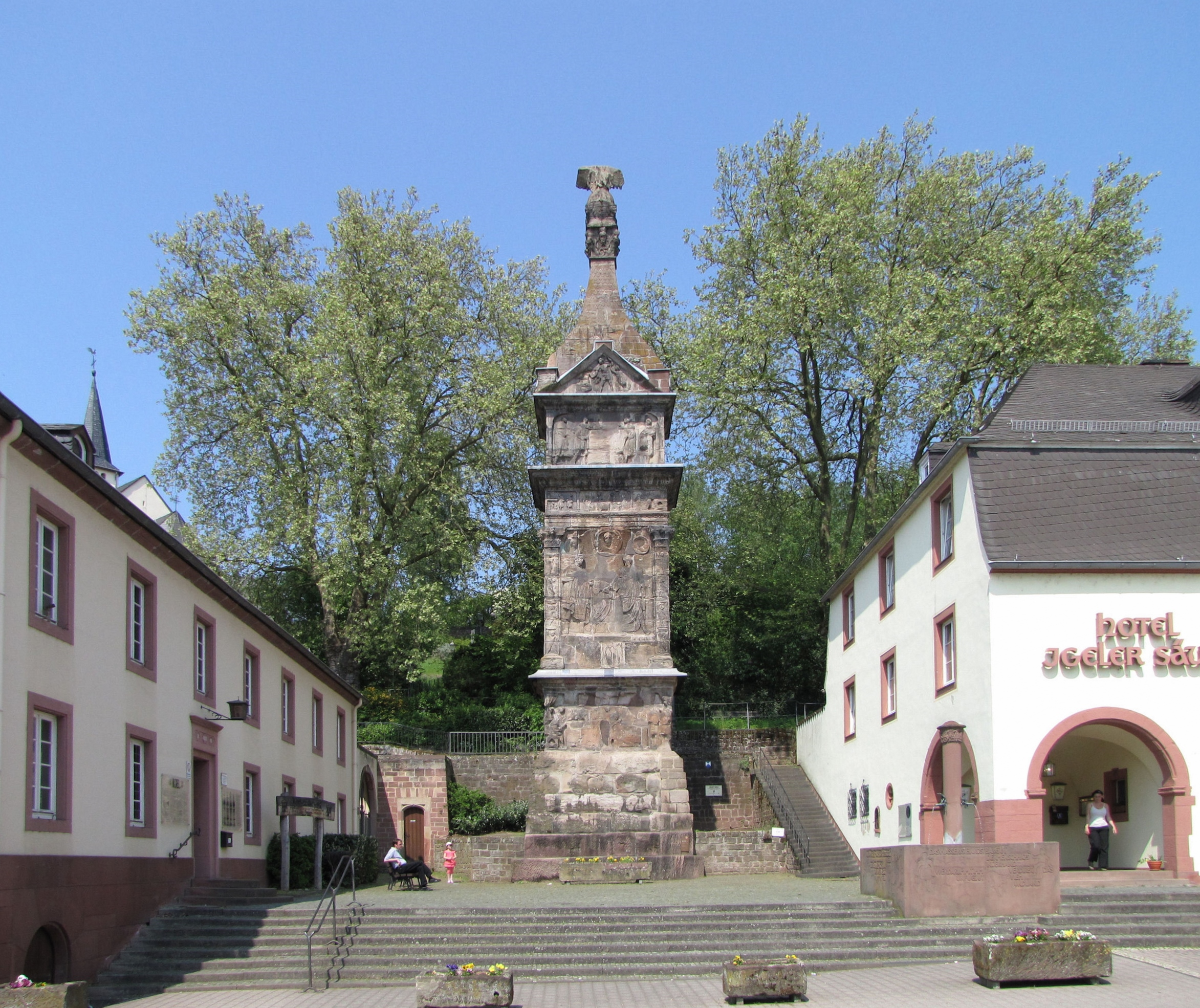
Igel Column

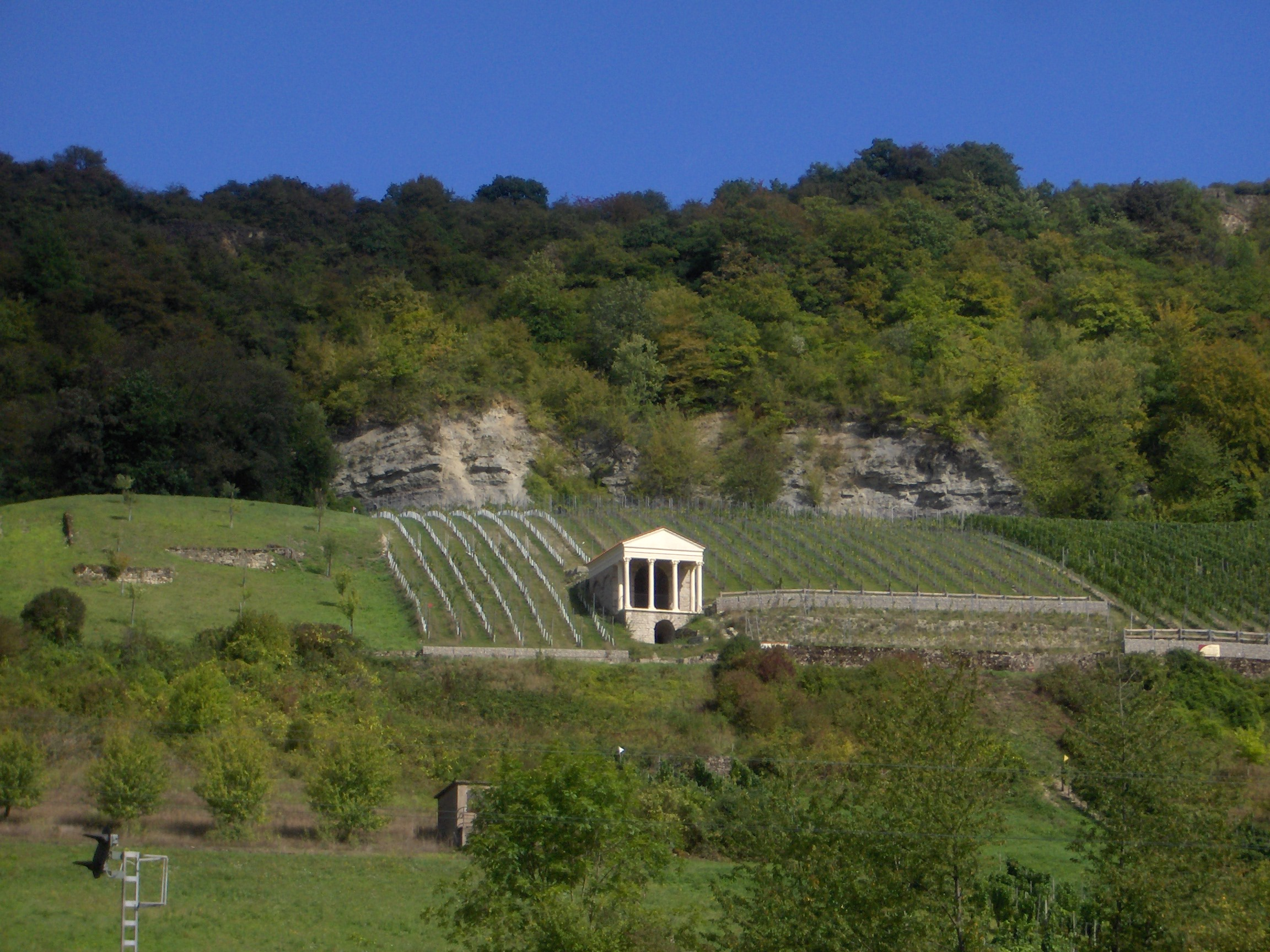
The "Grutenhäuschen" a partly reconstructed Roman tomb in the vineyards near Igel.
