= Roman Bridge (Trier) =

Ancient structure in Trier, Germany

Roman Bridge Römerbrücke
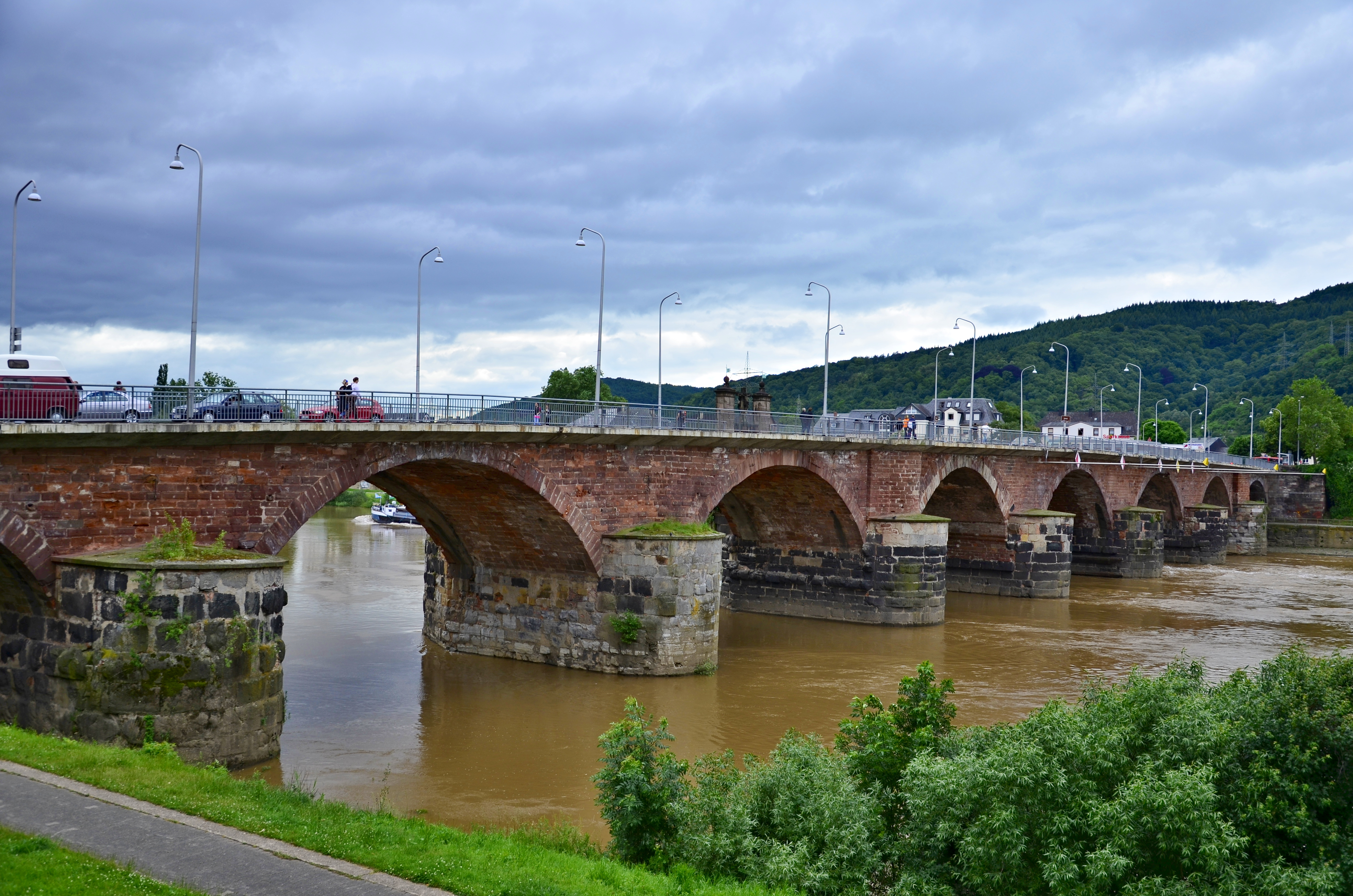
- Coordinates: 49°45′07″N 6°37′35″E
- Crosses: Moselle
- Locale: Trier, Rhineland-Palatinate, Germany

Characteristics
- Material: Stone

History
- Construction end: 2nd century AD

UNESCO World Heritage Site
- Official name: Moselle Bridge
- Part of: Roman Monuments, Cathedral of St Peter and Church of Our Lady in Trier
- Criteria: Cultural: (i), (iii), (iv), (vi)
- Reference: 367-002
- Inscription: 1986 (10th Session)

Location
- Interactive map of Roman Bridge; Römerbrücke

The Roman Bridge (German: Römerbrücke) is an ancient structure in Trier, Germany, over the Moselle. It is the oldest standing bridge in the country, and the oldest Roman bridge north of the Alps. The nine bridge pillars date from the 2nd century AD, replacing two older, wooden bridges that date at least as far back as 17 BC. In Roman times, tossing a coin off the bridge into the Moselle was an offering of good luck. Today, experts believe approximately one million coins could be lying hidden in the riverbed. The upper part was renewed twice, in the early 12th and in the early 18th century, after suffering destruction in war. Along with other Roman and Early Gothic sites in Trier, the bridge was inscribed on the UNESCO World Heritage List in 1986 because of its historical importance and architecture.

== Historical views ==
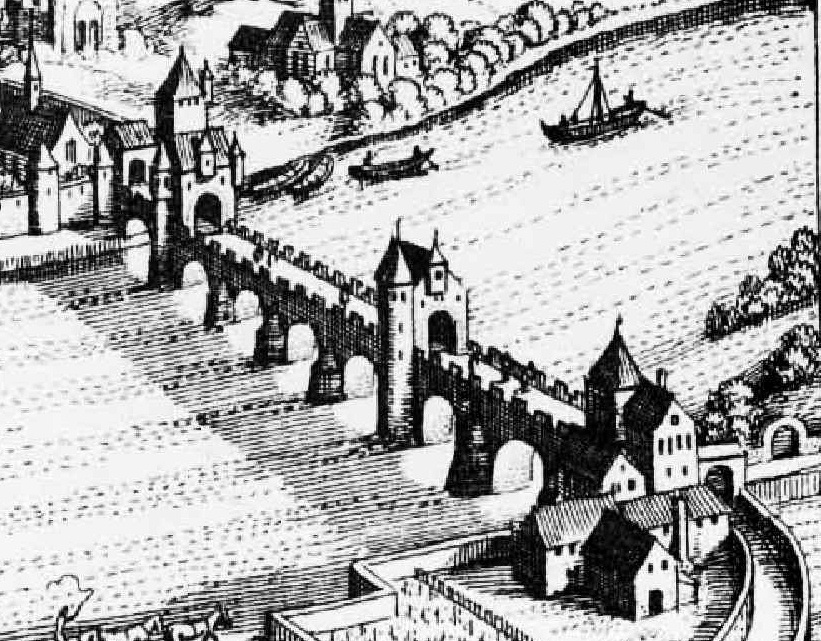
Engraving by Merian (1646)

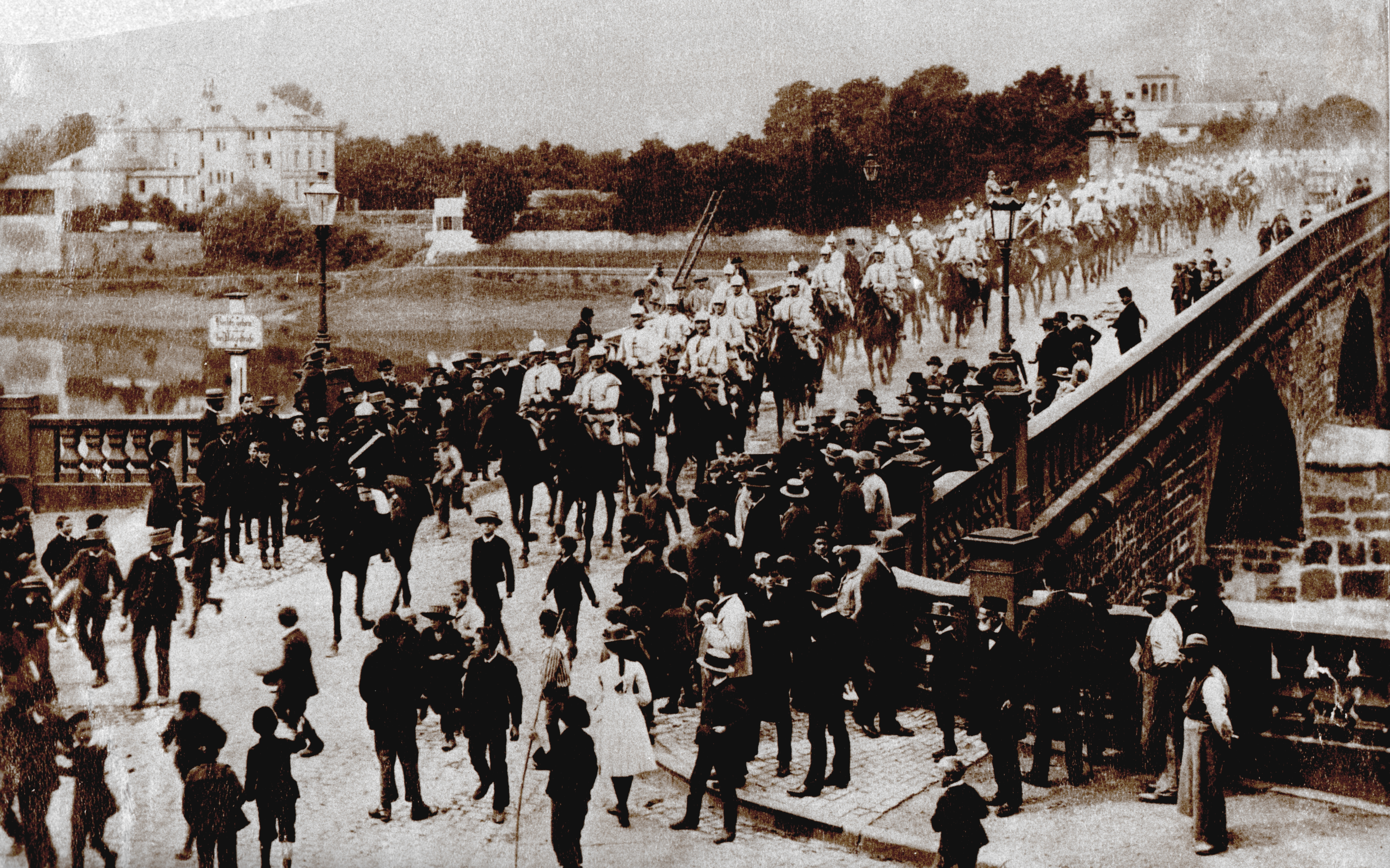
Emperor's Maneuver, parade of the 8th (Rhenish) Cuirassiers (1893)

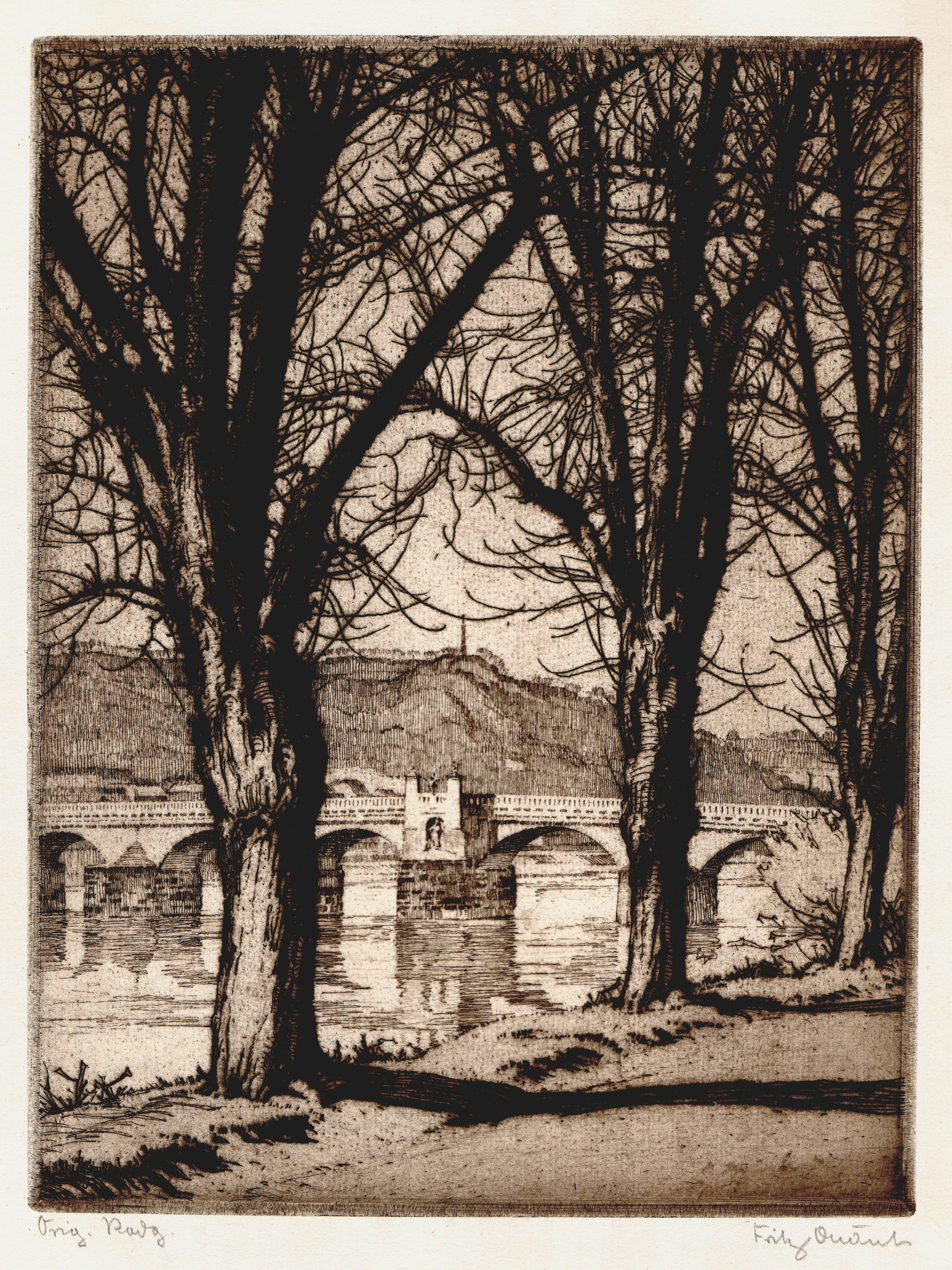
Etching by Fritz Quant (c. 1910)

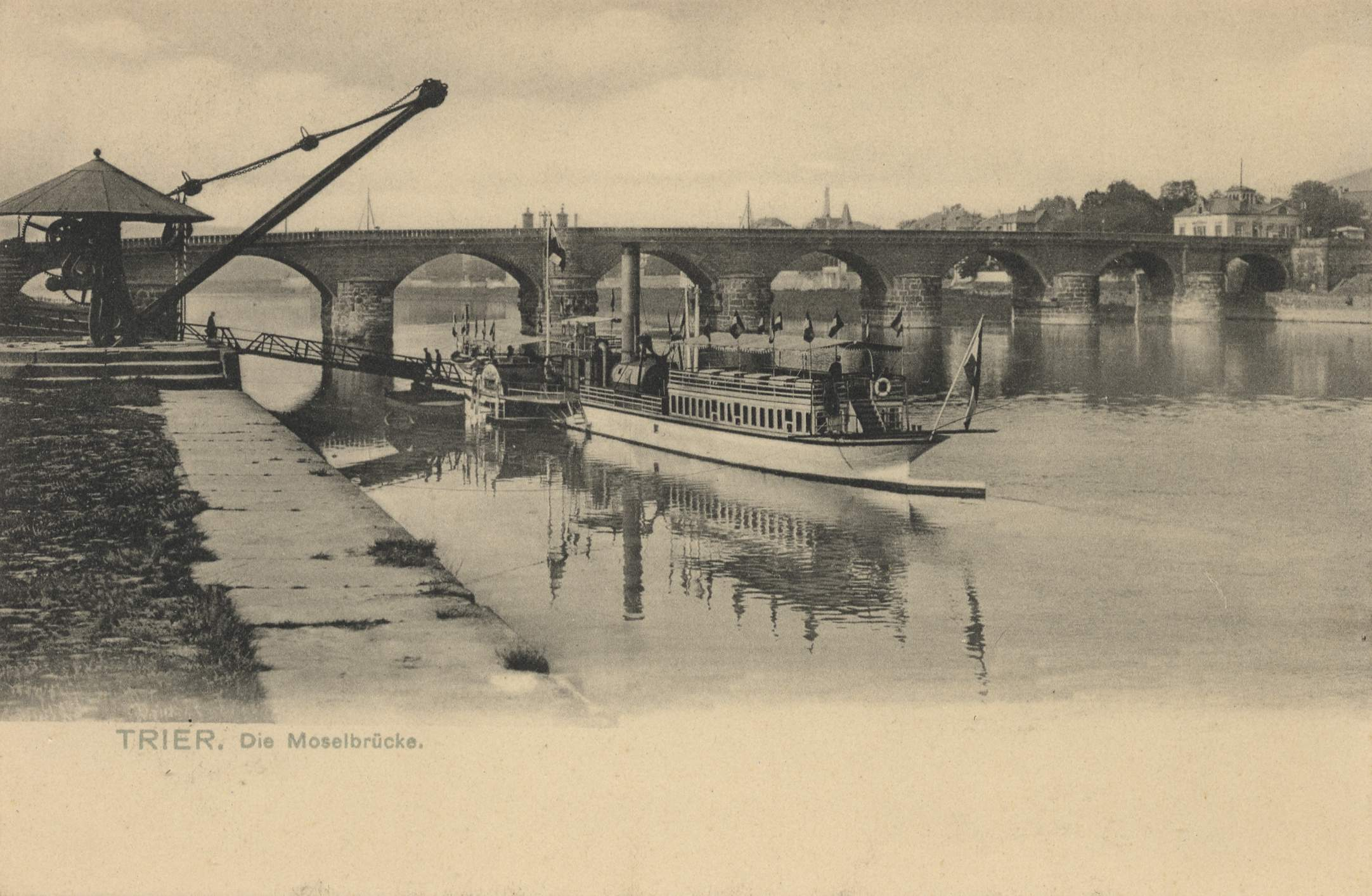
Postcard (1910)

== See also ==
- List of Roman bridges
- List of bridges in Germany
- List of bridges
