= Trier Amphitheater =

Ancient Roman amphitheater in Trier, Germany

UNESCO World Heritage Site
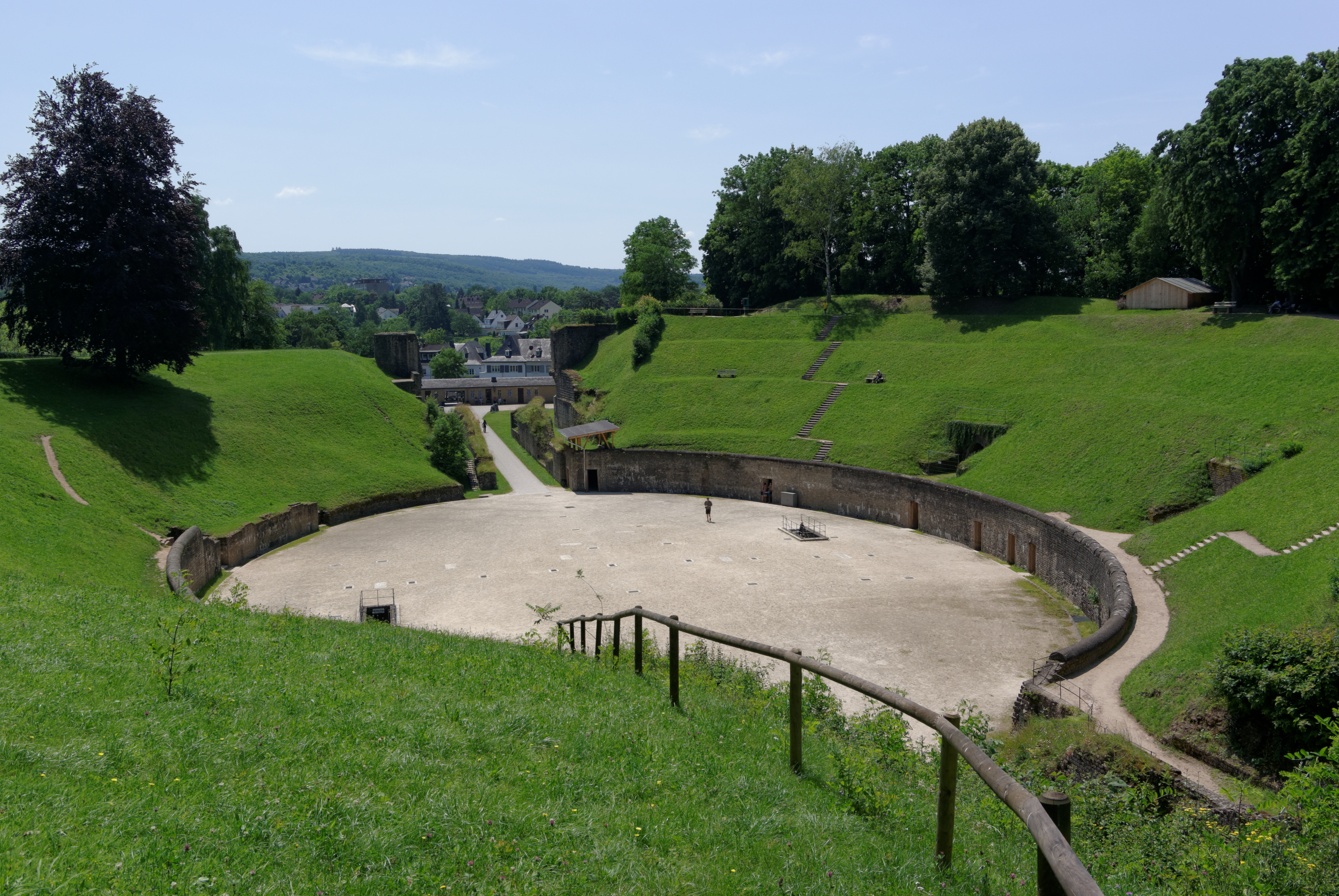

- Location within Germany Location within Rhineland-Palatinate
- Location: Trier, Rhineland-Palatinate, Germany
- Part of: Roman Monuments, Cathedral of St Peter and Church of Our Lady in Trier
- Criteria: Cultural: (i), (iii), (iv), (vi)
- Reference: 367-001
- Inscription: 1986 (10th Session)
- Coordinates: 49°44′53″N 6°38′57″E

Trier Amphitheater

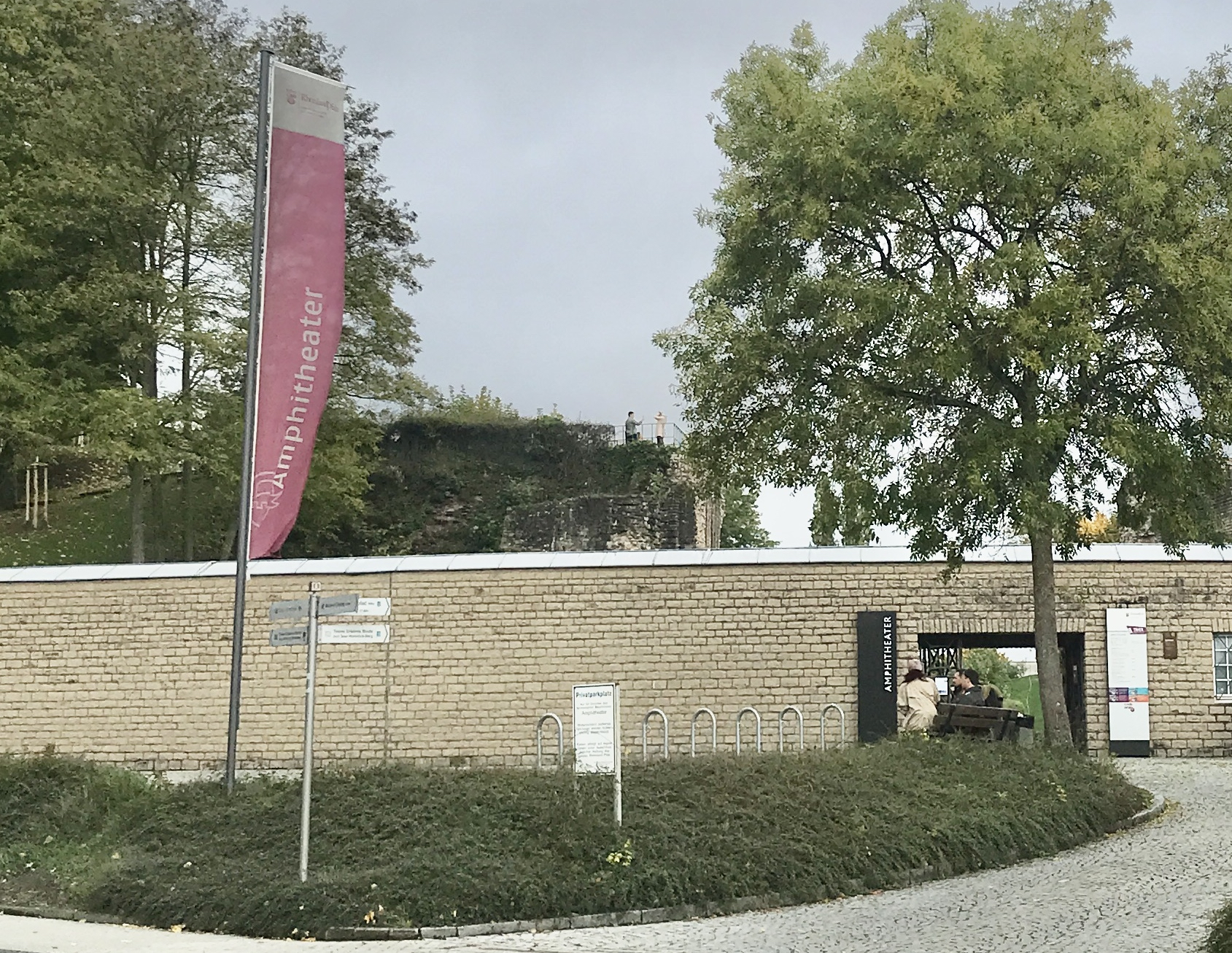
Entry of museum Amphitheater Trier, 2022

The Trier Amphitheater is a Roman amphitheater in Trier, Germany. It is designated as part of the Roman Monuments, Cathedral of St. Peter and Church of Our Lady in Trier UNESCO World Heritage Site as a testimony to the importance of Trier as a major Roman city north of the Alps.

== History ==
Trier and its amphitheatre resembled many Roman cities of its time in that many infamous gladiatorial contests occurred there. The structure which was dug into the side of a hill was erected around the 2nd century A.D during the rule of Antoninus Pius. Measuring 120 by 145 meters, the amphitheatre could accommodate approximately 20,000 spectators and is the 10th largest Roman amphitheatre still intact. It was built into what was at the time the city's wall, to the east of the modern and Roman city centre. When Constantius Chlorus moved to Trier, Germany around 293 during the Tetrarchy he renovated the amphitheater.

== Usage ==
The multiple usages of the arena included gladiator events and animal shows in which a cellar under the arena was utilized to store the animals and sentence prisoners to death. Remnants of wood and 1200 coins from the late 3rd century onward have been found in the cellar, suggesting that the cellar and other subterranean galleries were built after the original amphitheatre. On the eastern bank of the amphitheatre, a small burial ground was discovered in 1996, containing the graves of 46 people. Today, the amphitheatre is used for simulated gladiator fights and performances.

== Gallery ==
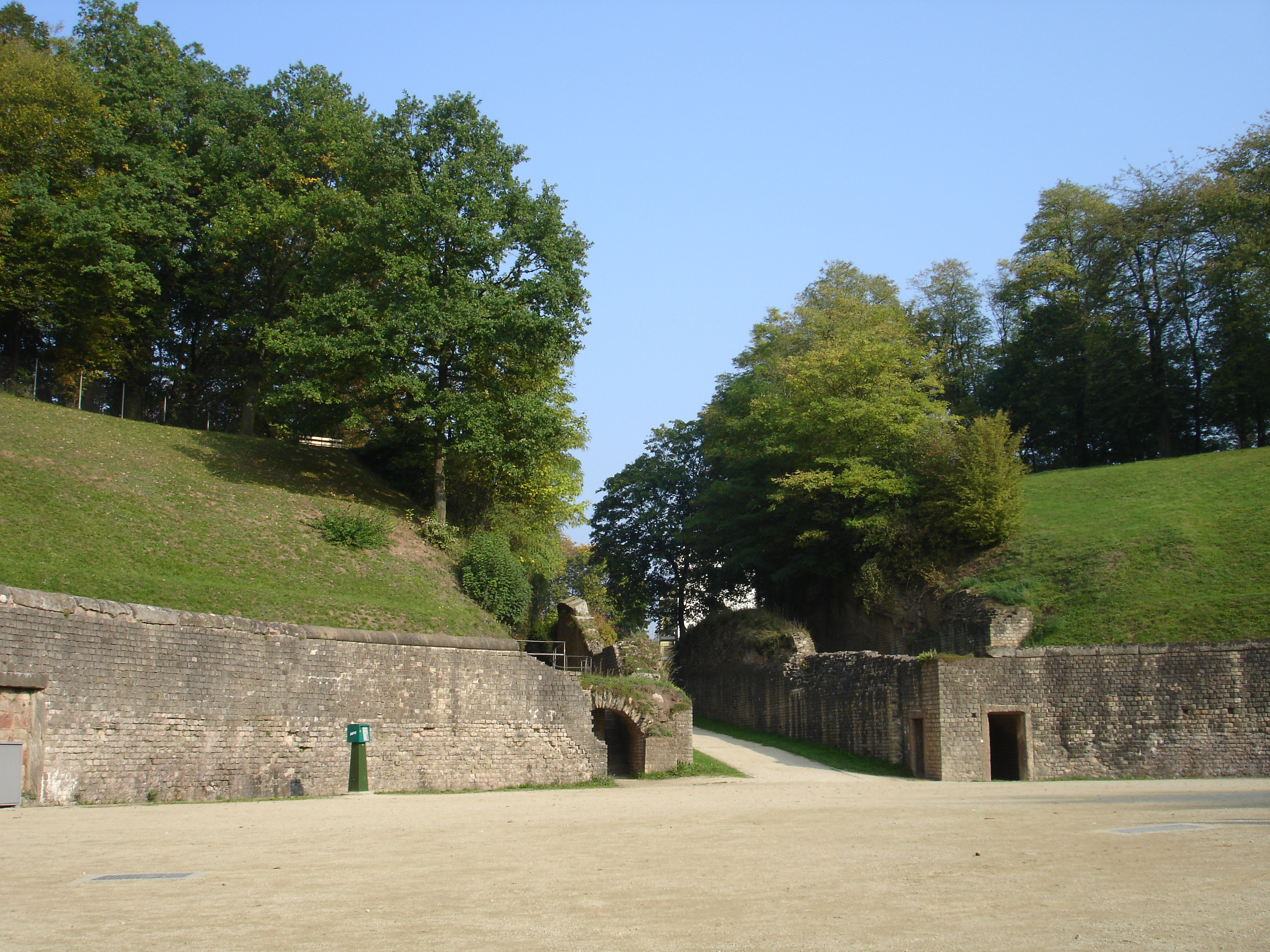

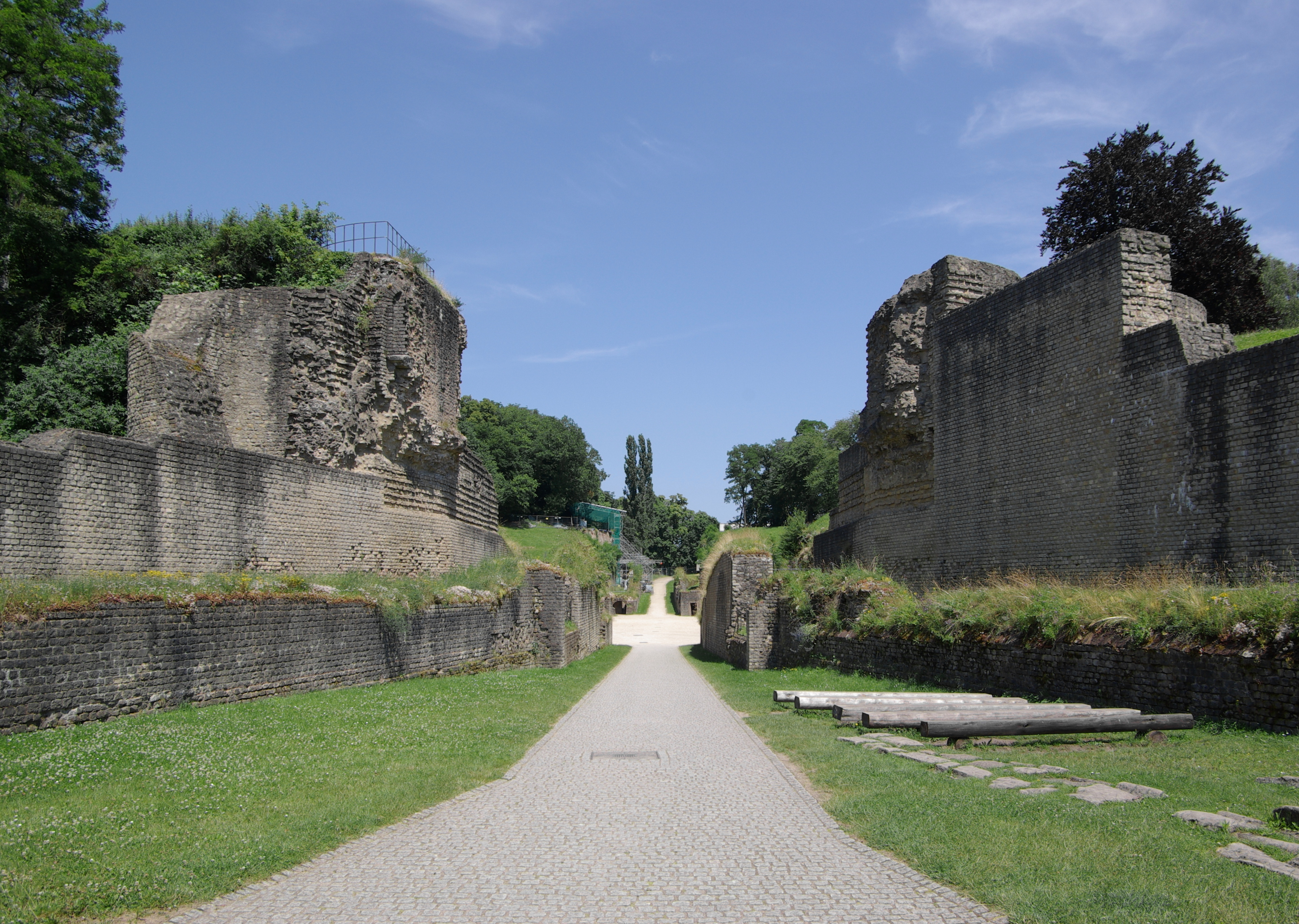

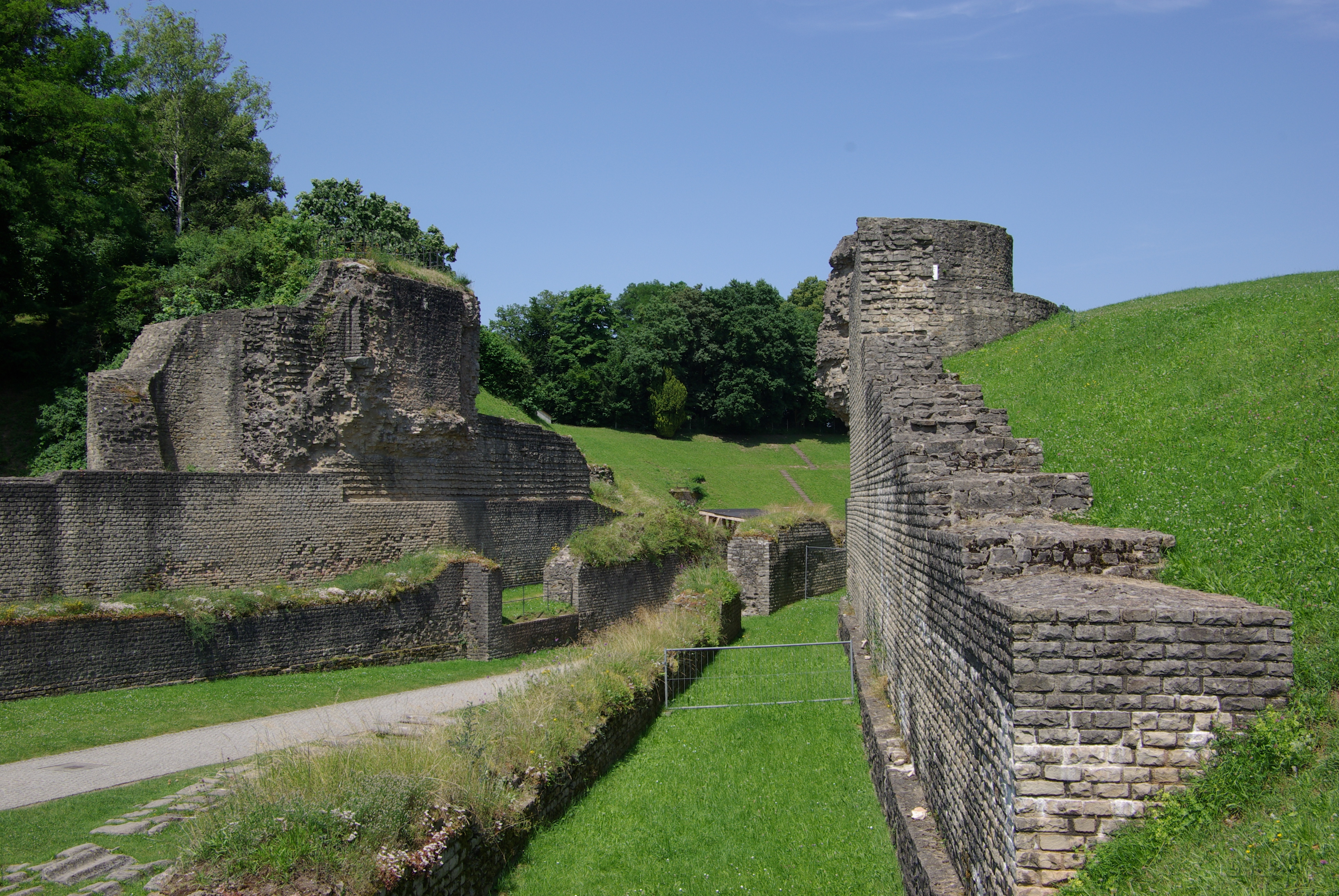

== See also ==
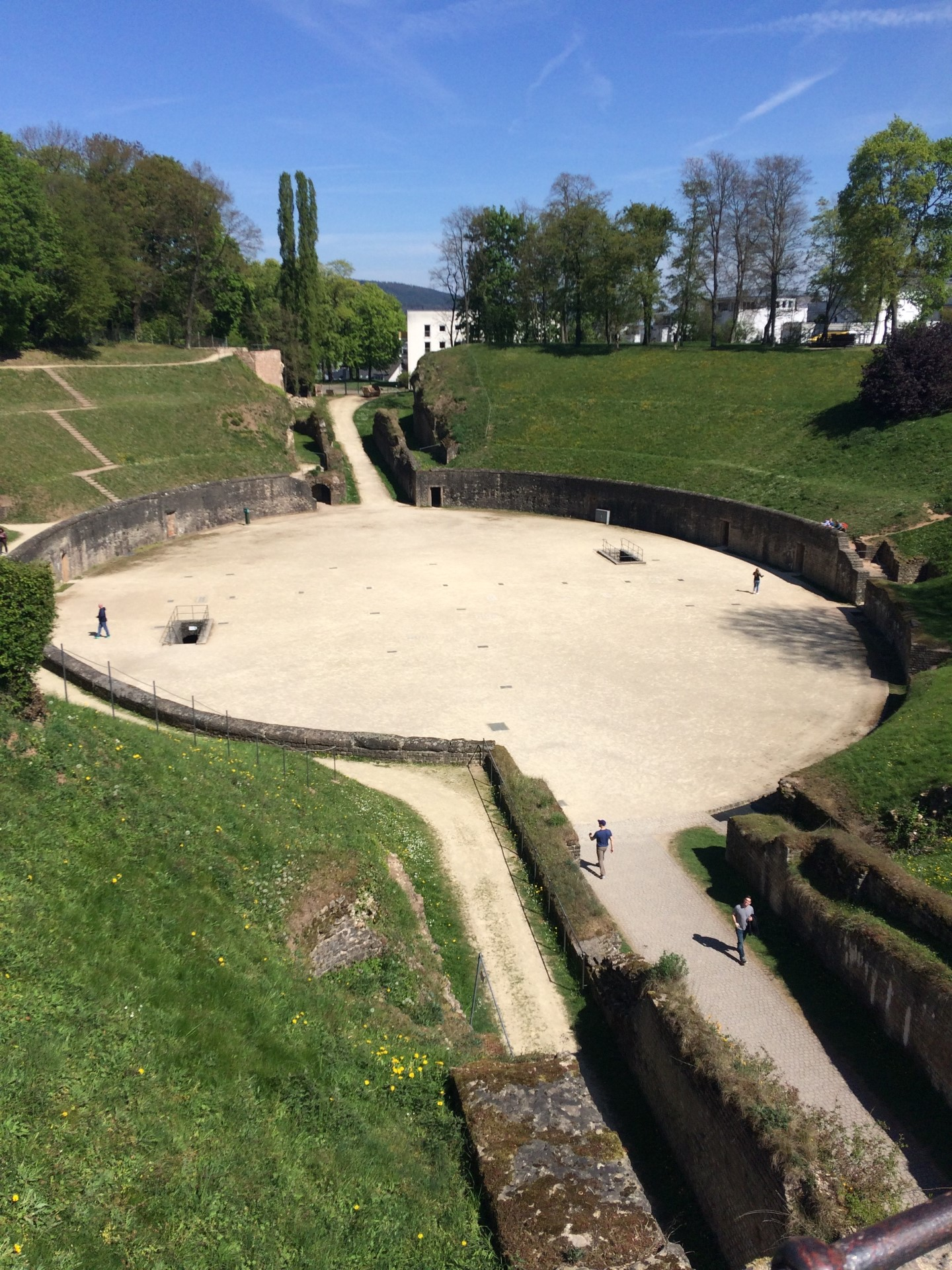
Trier Amphitheater in 2017

- List of Roman amphitheatres
