= Aula Palatina =

Roman palace basilica, now a church, in Trier, Germany

Basilica of Constantine
- Konstantinbasilika
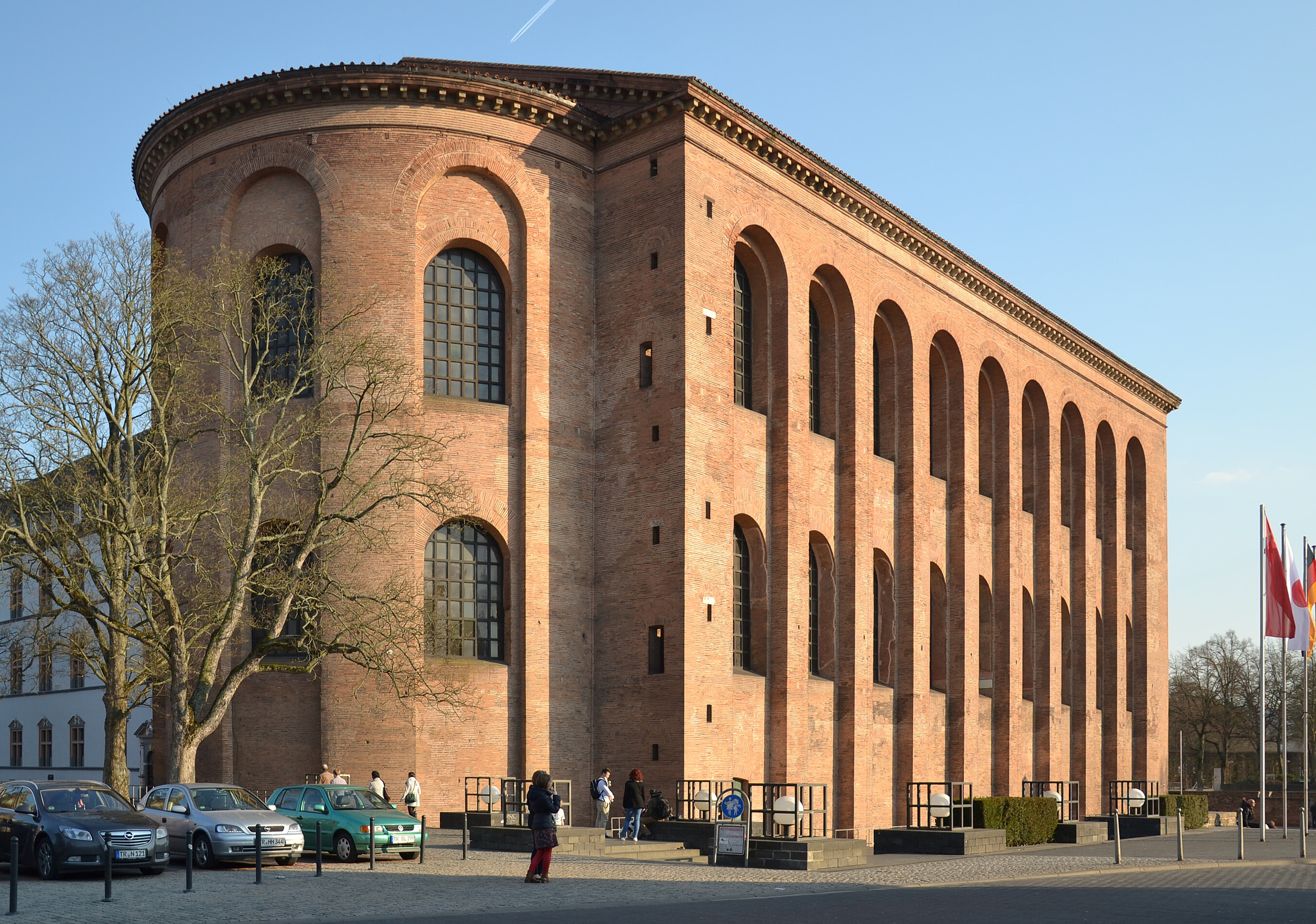
- Basilica of Constantine, view from the northwest
- Basilica of Constantine
- 49°45′12″N 6°38′36″E
- Location: Trier
- Country: Germany
- Denomination: Evangelical Church in the Rhineland

Architecture
- Style: Early Christianity
- Years built: 310; 1716 years ago

UNESCO World Heritage Site
- Part of: Roman Monuments, Cathedral of St Peter and Church of Our Lady in Trier
- Criteria: Cultural: (i), (iii), (iv), (vi)
- Reference: 367-007
- Inscription: 1986 (10th Session)

The Aula Palatina, also called Basilica of Constantine (German: Konstantinbasilika), at Trier, Germany, is a Roman palace basilica and an early Christian structure built between AD 300 and 310 during the reigns of Constantius Chlorus and Constantine the Great.

It is used as the Church of the Redeemer and owned by a congregation within the Evangelical Church in the Rhineland. The basilica contains the largest extant hall from classical antiquity (see List of ancient Greek and Roman roofs). The hall has a length of 67 m, a width of 26.05 m and a height of 33 m. The Aula Palatina was designated as a UNESCO World Heritage Site in 1986 as part of the Roman Monuments, Cathedral of St. Peter and Church of Our Lady in Trier site.

== Description and history ==
The Aula Palatina generally follows the standard architectural plan of earlier basilicas, with a lack of columns in the interior and an open, box-like shape. It is unique in its addition of a transverse vestibule reminiscent of a narthex. The basilica was made of solid brick, with black-and-white marble floors, and was equipped with a floor and wall-heating system (hypocaust). The basilica was originally part of a palace complex and was not a free-standing building, but had other smaller buildings (such as a forehall, a vestibule and some service buildings) attached to it. The outer courtyard and railings on the first and second stories of the basilica no longer exist, but overall it is remarkably well preserved.

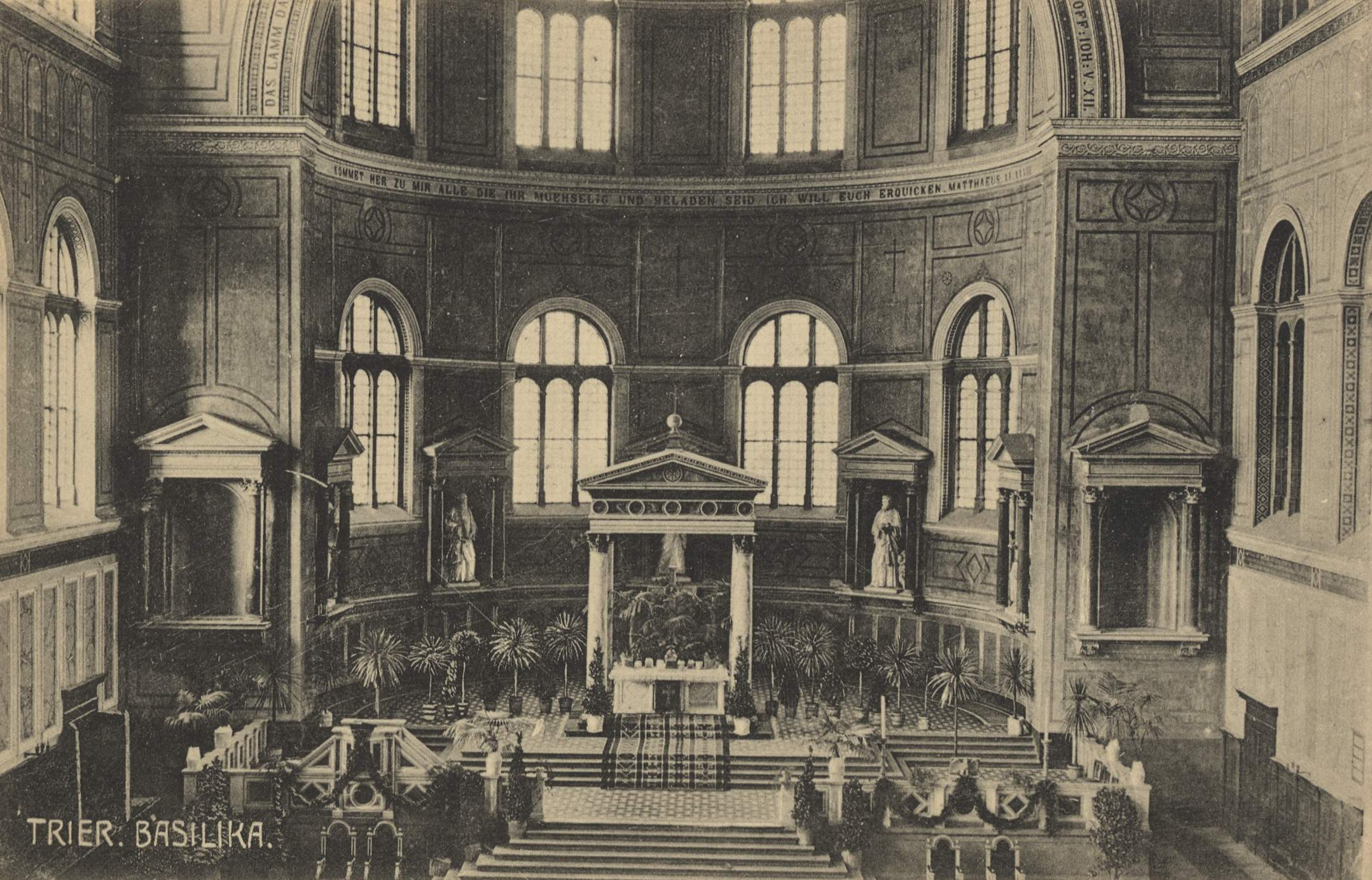
A postcard of the interior, c. 1900

During the Middle Ages, it was used as the residence for the Bishop of Trier. For that, the apse was redesigned into living quarters and pinnacles were added to the top of its walls. In the 17th century, the archbishop Lothar von Metternich constructed his palace just next to the Aula Palatina and incorporated it into it doing some major redesign. Later, in the 19th century, Frederick William IV of Prussia ordered the building to be restored to its original Roman state, which was done under the supervision of the military architect Carl Schnitzler. In 1856, the Aula Palatina became a Protestant church. In 1944, the building burned due to an air raid of the allied forces during World War II. When it was repaired after the war, the historical inner decorations from the 19th century were not reconstructed, so that the brick walls are visible from the inside as well.

A new organ was installed in 2014. It has over 6,000 organ pipes.

== Gallery ==
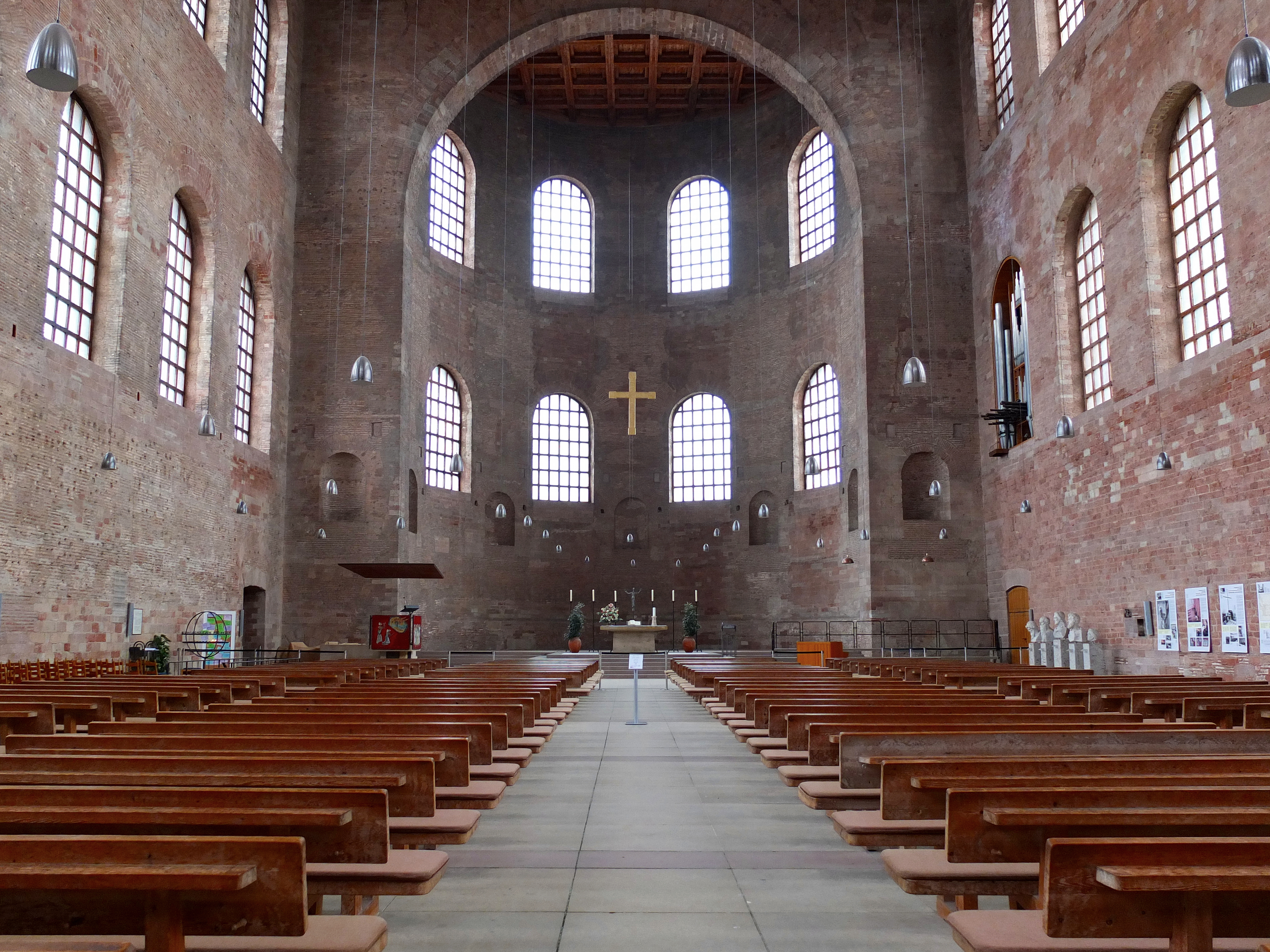
Interior view facing north

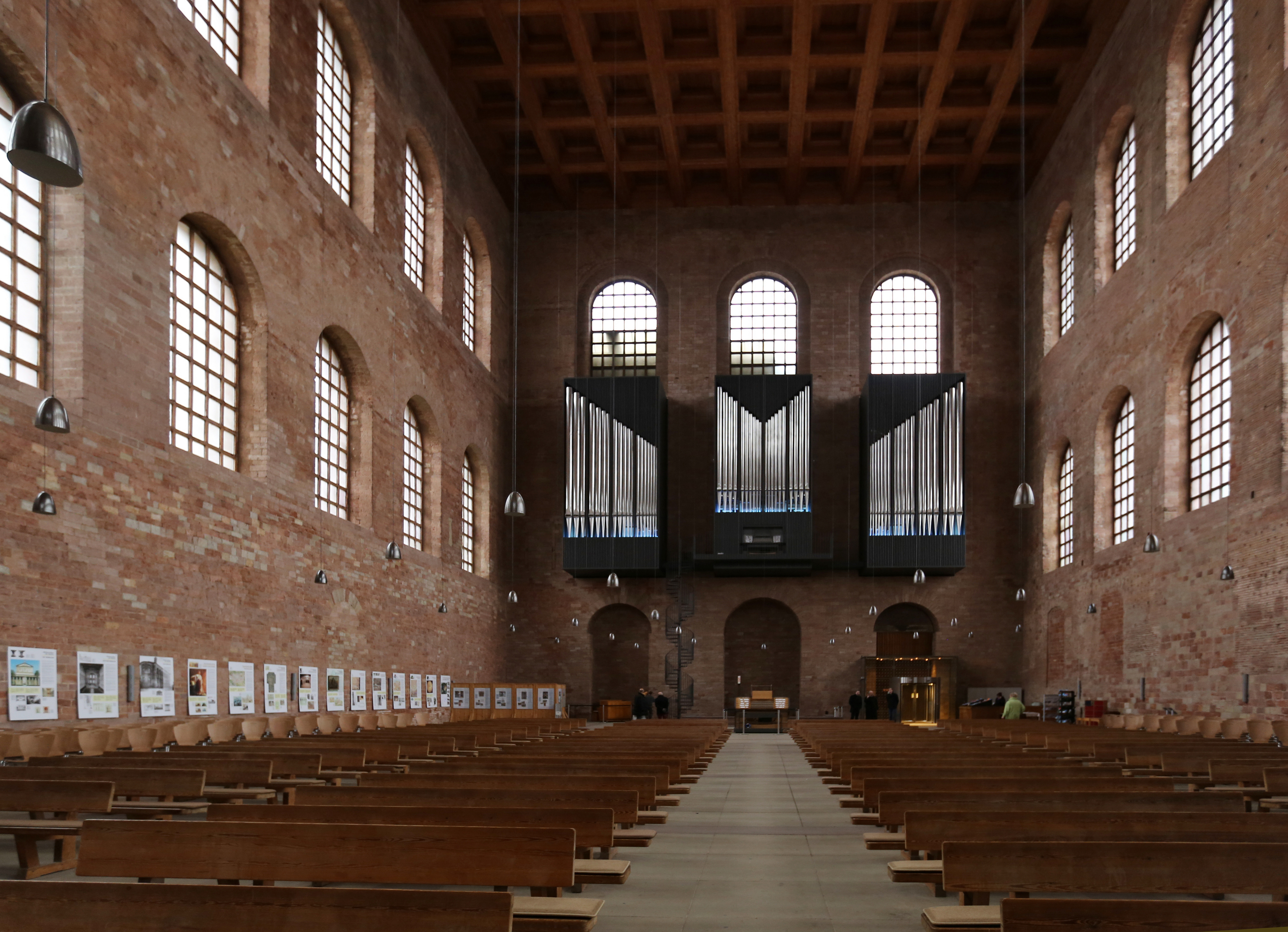
Interior view facing south
