= Culture Commission =

The Culture Commission, or "CLT" Commission is affiliated with UNESCO and contributes to the identification and protection of UNESCO World Heritage Sites.
