= History of Trier =

Coat of arms of Trier

Trier in Rhineland-Palatinate, whose history dates to the Roman Empire, is the oldest city in Germany. Traditionally it was known in English by its French name of Treves.

== Prehistory ==
The first traces of human settlement in the area of the city show evidence of linear pottery settlements dating from the early Neolithic period. Since the last pre-Christian centuries, members of the Celtic tribe of the Treveri settled in the area of today's Trier.

== Roman Empire ==
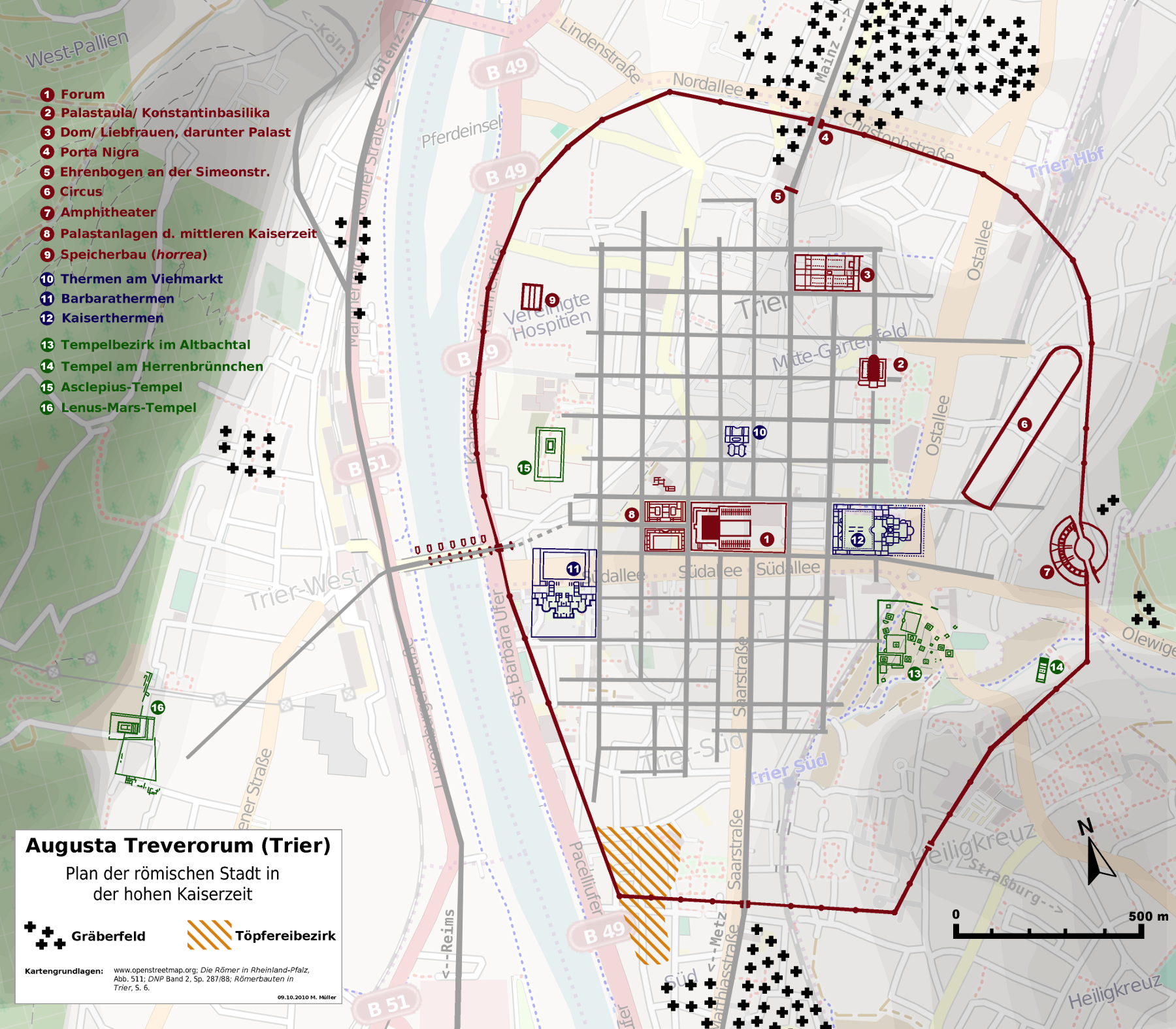
Map showing the Roman city plan of Augusta Treverorum

The Porta Nigra built 160-180 AD

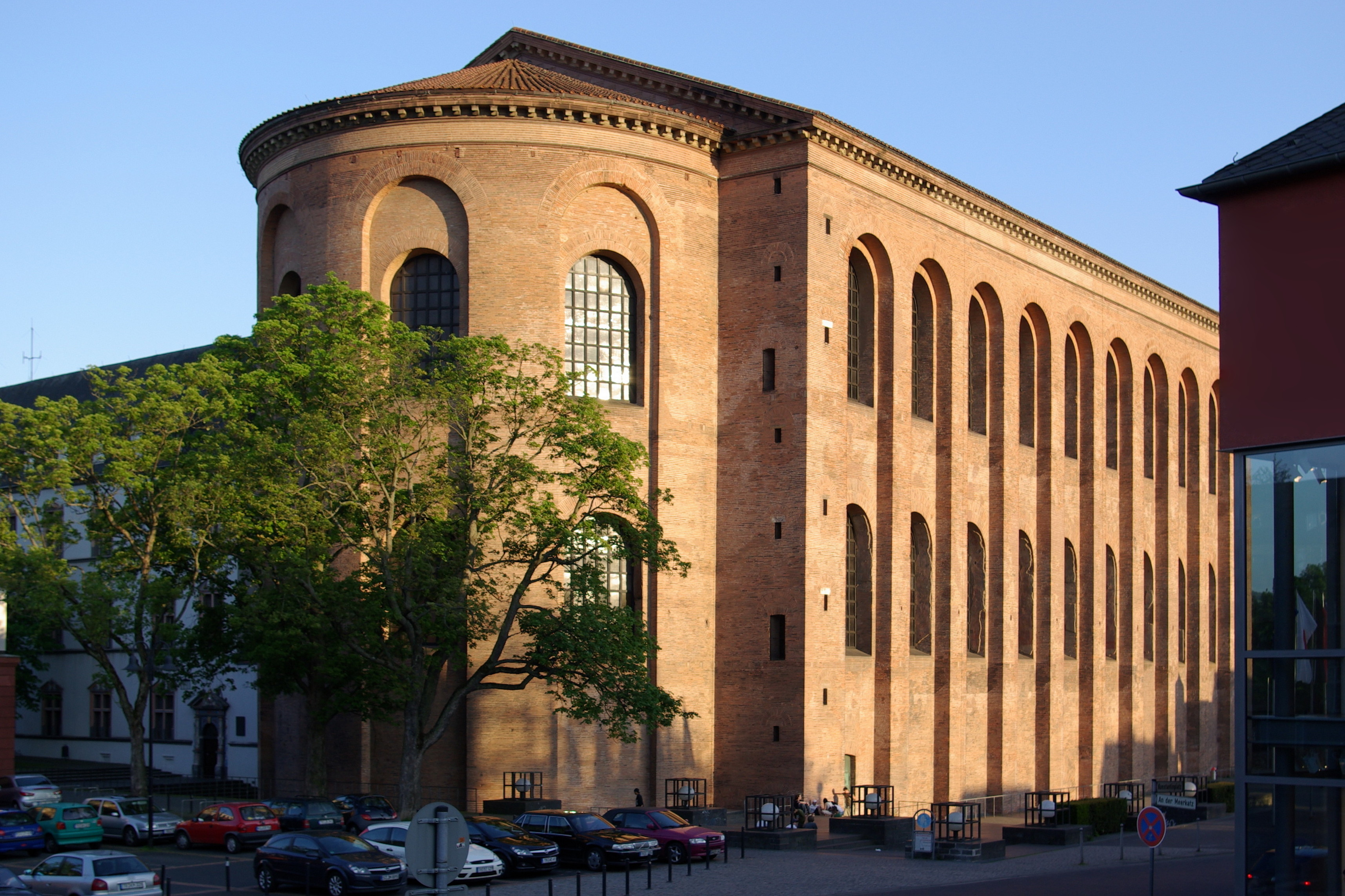
The Aula Palatina (Constantine Basilica) built during the reign of Constantine I (306-337 AD)

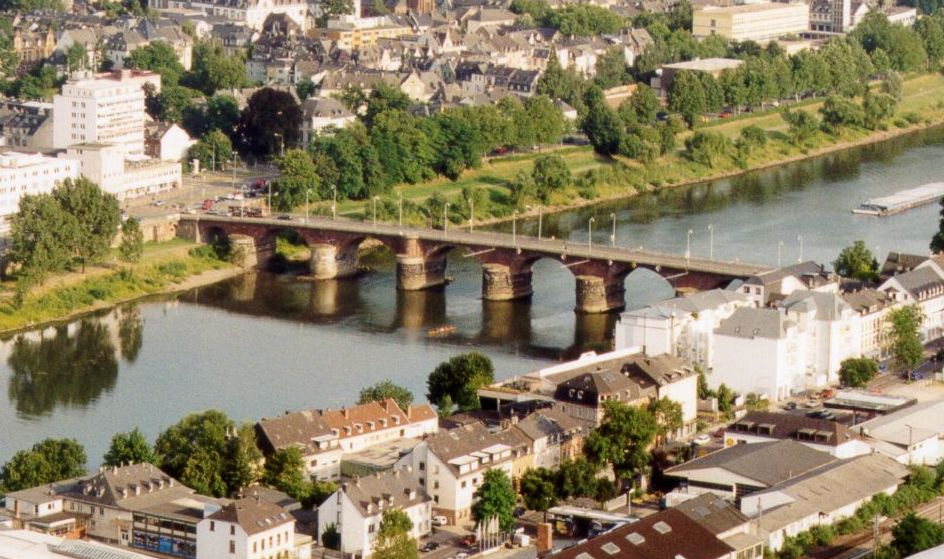
The Roman Bridge across the Moselle River

The Romans under Julius Caesar first subdued the Treveri in 58 to 50 BC. No later than 16 BC, at the foot of the hill later christened the Petrisberg, upon which a military camp had been set up in 30 BC and abandoned again a few months later, the Romans founded the city of Augusta Treverorum ("City of Augustus in the land of the Treveri"), which has a claim to being the oldest city in Germany. The honour of being named after the Emperor was only locally shared by Augsburg and Augst in northern Switzerland. Following the reorganisation of the Roman provinces in Germany in 16 BC, Emperor Augustus decided that the city should become the capital of the province of Belgica. Shortly before AD 100, an amphitheatre was built, the signal sign of a city of any importance. By the first half of the second century another major structure, a Roman circus, had reached truly monumental proportions.

Trier rose in importance during the Empire's third-century crisis, as the chief city of the province of Gallia Belgica. From 271 to 274 AD, Trier was the second city of the breakaway Gallic Empire, at first under Postumus, who was proclaimed in Cologne, then under his ephemeral successor, Victorinus, who made his base at Trier, where he had rebuilt a large house with a mosaic proclaiming his position as tribune in Postumus' Gallic Praetorian Guard; the city served again as capital under the emperors Tetricus I and II. From the second half of the 3rd century onwards, Trier was the seat of an archbishopric; the first bishop being Eucharius. In the year 275, the city was destroyed in an invasion by the Alamanni. Diocletian recognized the urgency of maintaining an imperial presence in the Gauls, and established first Maximian, then Constantius Chlorus as caesars at Trier; from 293 to 395, Trier was one of the residences of the Western Roman Emperor, and its position required the monumental settings that betokened imperial government.

A mint was immediately established by Constantius, which came to be the principal mint of the Roman West. A new stadium was added to the amphitheater, to stage chariot races. Under the rule of Constantine the Great (306–337), the city was rebuilt and buildings such as the Palastaula (known today as the Constantine Basilica) and the Imperial Baths (Kaiserthermen), the largest surviving Roman baths outside Rome, were begun under Constantius and completed c 314, constructed by his son Constantine, who left Trier in the hands of his son Crispus. In 326, sections of the imperial family's private residential palaces were extended and converted to a large double basilica, the remains of which are still partly recognisable in the area of the Trier Cathedral (Trierer Dom) and the church "Liebfrauenkirche". A demolished imperial palace has left shattered sections of painted ceiling, which scholars believe once belonged to Constantine's young wife, Fausta, whom he later put to death.

From 318 onwards Trier was the seat of the Gallic prefecture (the Praefectus Praetorio Galliarium) which governed the western Roman provinces from Morocco to Britain. The praetorian prefects usually numbering 3–4, were the senior civilian officials taking precedence over all other officials and army officers. They were vice-regents of the emperors who alone with them could pronounce final verdicts. Constantine's son Constantius II resided here from 328 to 340. Roman Trier was the birthplace of Saint Ambrose ca. 340, who later became the Bishop of Milan and was eventually named a Doctor of the Roman Catholic Church long after his death in 397. It is also where Saint Athanasius was first exiled by Constantine in 336.

From 367 under Valentinian I Trier once more became an imperial residence until 375. It was the largest city north of the Alps. Gratian resided there for most of his reign until assassinated in 383. It was the capital of Magnus Maximus, who ruled the prefecture of Gaul, as emperor from 383 to 388. Valentinian II visited the city. In 407, shortly after the invasion of Gaul by the Vandals, Alans and Suebi, the Gallic prefecture was relocated to Arles, on the Rhône.

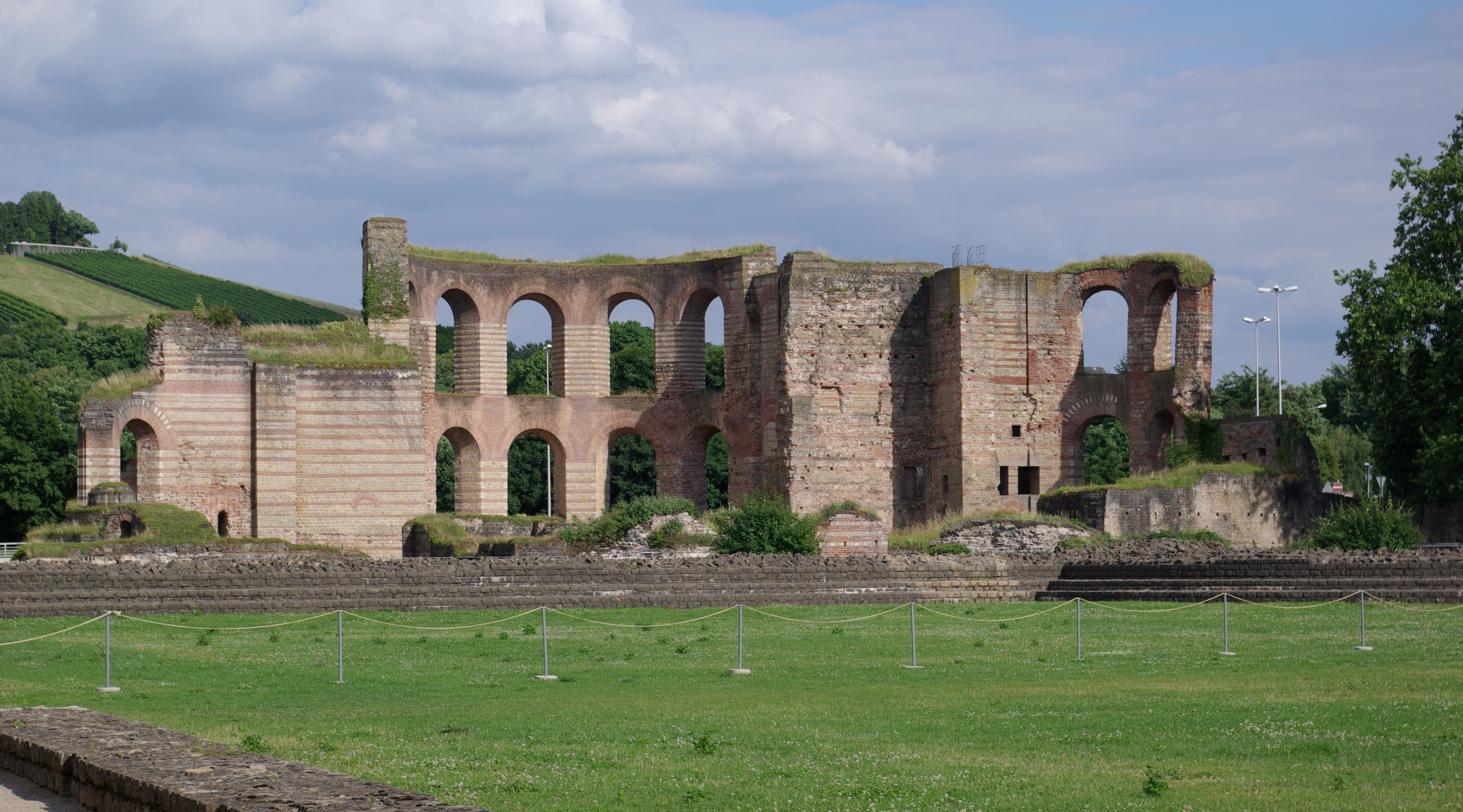
The Imperial Baths (Kaiserthermen) built in the 4th century AD

Roman Trier had been subjected to attacks by Germanic tribes from 350 onwards, but these had been repulsed by Emperor Julian. After the invasions of 407 the Romans were able to reestablish the Rhine frontier and hold northern Gaul tenuously until the end of the 450s, when control was finally lost to the Franks and local military commanders who claimed to represent central Roman authority. During the early 5th century, sources indicate Trier was sacked four times by the Franks. According to Lanting & van der Plicht (2010), this happened in 411 (more probable than 407), 413, 421, and probably 428 or 435. The Huns under Attila also sacked Trier in 451. The city became definitively part of Frankish territory (Francia Rhinensis) around 485; the last Roman administrator of Trier was Arbogast. As a result of the conflicts of this period, Trier's population decreased from an estimated 80,000 in the 4th century to 5,000 at the beginning of the 6th century.

== Middle Ages ==
By the end of the 5th century, Trier was under Frankish rule, first controlled by the Merovingian dynasty, then by the Carolingians. The city still maintained a small group of romance speaking inhabitants in the early 8th century. As a result of the Treaty of Verdun in 843, by which the grandsons of Charlemagne divided his empire into three parts, Trier was incorporated into the Kingdom of Lorraine (Lotharingia). After the death of Lothair II, ruler of Lorraine, Trier in 870 became part of the East Frankish Empire, later called Germany, under Henry I.

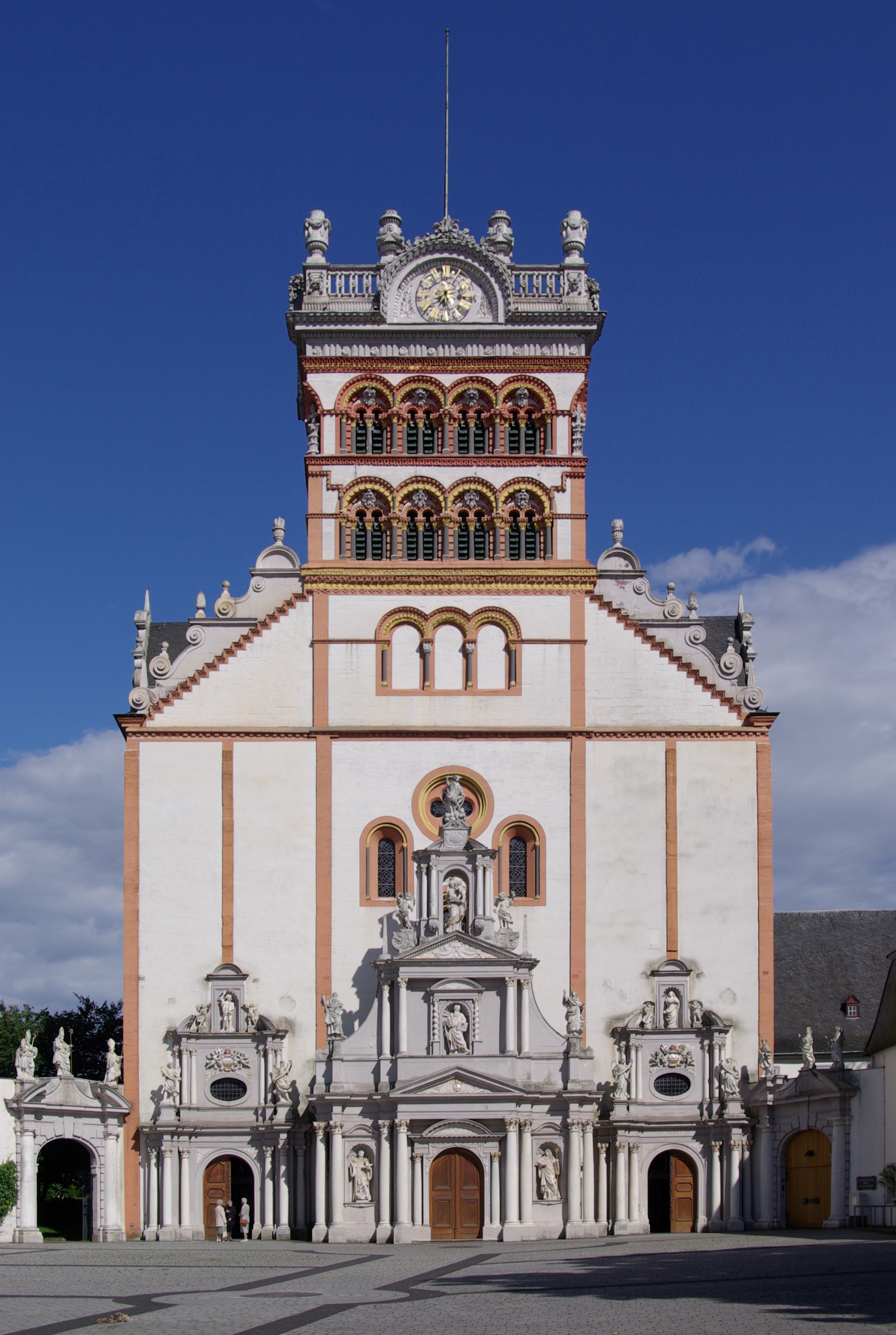
Place of pilgrimage: St. Matthias benedictine abbey.

Many abbeys and monasteries were founded in the early Frankish time, including St. Maximin, St. Martin, St. Irminen, St. Maria ad Martyres/St.Mergen and others. The only important abbey that survived wars and secularization by the French at the beginning of 1800 is the Benedictine abbey St. Matthias in the south of Trier. Here, the first three bishops of Trier, Eucharius, Valerius and Maternus are buried alongside the apostle Saint Matthias. This is the only tomb of an apostle to be located in Europe north of the Alps, thus making Trier together with Rome in Italy (burial place of St. Peter the apostle) and Santiago de Compostela in Spain (tomb of St. James) one of three major places of pilgrimage in Europe for Catholics. In 882, Trier was sacked by the Vikings, the Great Danish Army, who burnt most churches and abbeys. This was the end of the systematically built Roman Trier.

Medieval legend, recorded in 1105 in the Gesta Treverorum, makes Trebeta son of Ninus the founder of Trier. Also of medieval date is the inscription at the facade of the Red House of Trier market,

ANTE ROMAM TREVIRIS STETIT ANNIS MILLE TRECENTIS.
PERSTET ET ÆTERNA PACE FRVATVR. AMEN.
("Thirteen hundred years before Rome, Trier stood / may it stand on and enjoy eternal peace, amen.")

being mentioned in the Codex Udalrici of 1125.

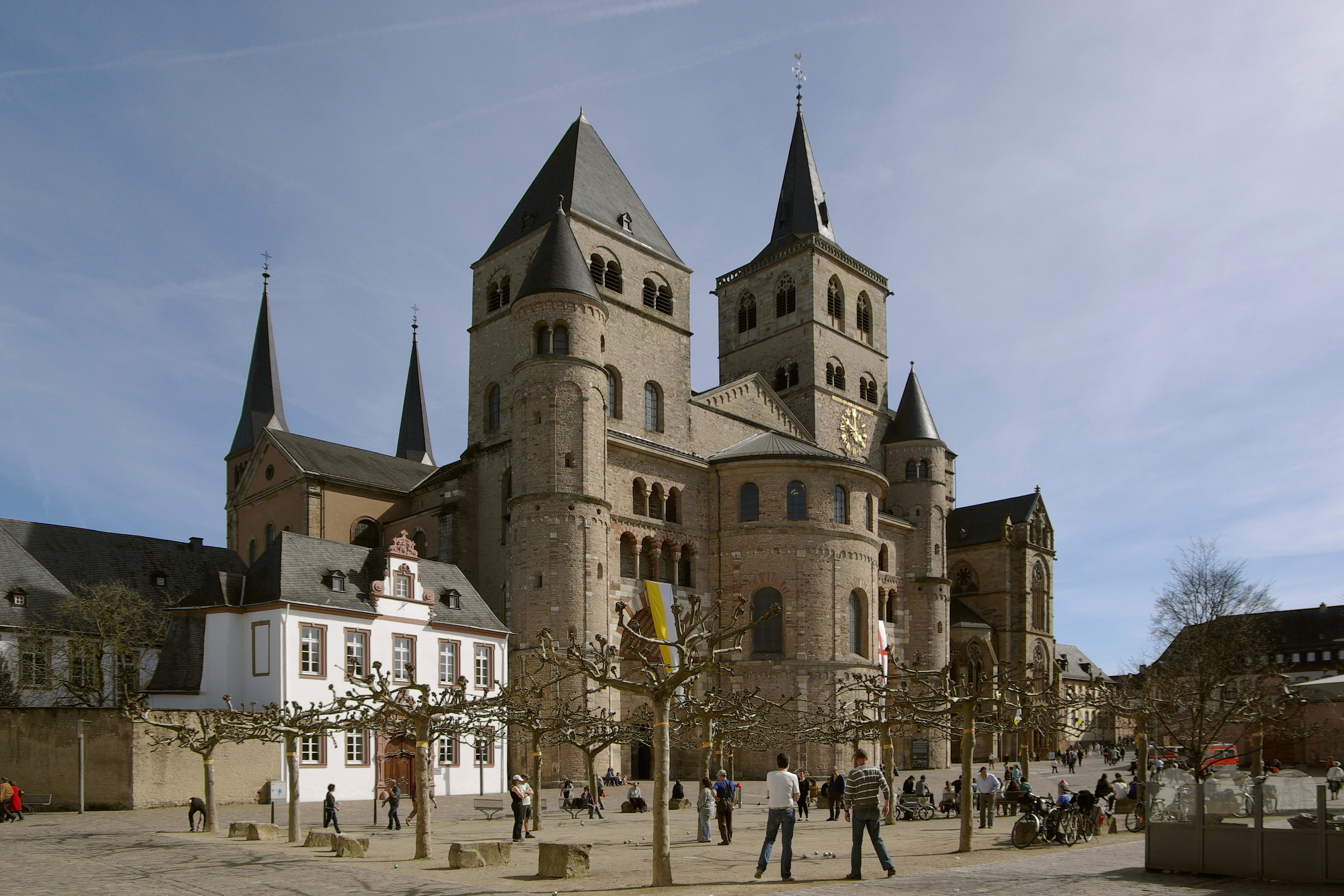
The Trier Cathedral (Trierer Dom) and the Church of our Lady (Liebfrauenkirche) to the right of the cathedral

From 902, when power passed into the hands of the archbishops, Trier was administered by the Vogt of the archbishopric, which developed its own seal in 1149. The Archbishop of Trier was, as chancellor of Burgundy, one of the seven Electors of the Holy Roman Empire, a right which originated in the 12th or 13th century, and which continued until the French Revolution. From the 10th century and throughout the Middle Ages, Trier made several attempts to achieve autonomy from the Archbishopric of Trier, but was ultimately unsuccessful. In 1212, the city received a charter from Emperor Otto IV, which was confirmed by Conrad IV. In 1309, however, it was forced to once again recognise the authority of the Archbishop, who was at that time the imposing Baldwin of Luxembourg, son of the Count of Luxemburg.

Elected in 1307 when he was only 22 years old, Baldwin was the most important Archbishop and Prince-Elector of Trier in the Middle Ages. He was the brother of the German King and Emperor Henry VII and his grandnephew Charles would later become German King and Emperor as Charles IV. He used his family connections to add considerable territories to the Electorate of Trier and is also known to have built many castles in the region. When he died in 1354, Trier was a prospering city.

The status of Trier as an archbishopric city was confirmed in 1364 by Emperor Charles IV and by the Reichskammergericht; the city's dream of self-rule came definitively to an end in 1583. Until the demise of the old empire, Trier remained the capital of the electoral Archbishopric of Trier, although not the residence of its head of state, the Prince-Elector. At its head was a court of lay assessors, which was expanded in 1443 by Archbishop Jacob I to include bipartisan mayors.

The Dombering (curtain wall of the cathedral) having been secured at the end of the 10th century, Archbishop Theoderich I and his successor Arnold II later set about surrounding the city by walls. This curtain wall, which followed the path now taken by the Alleenring, enclosed 1.38 square kilometres.

== Modern age ==
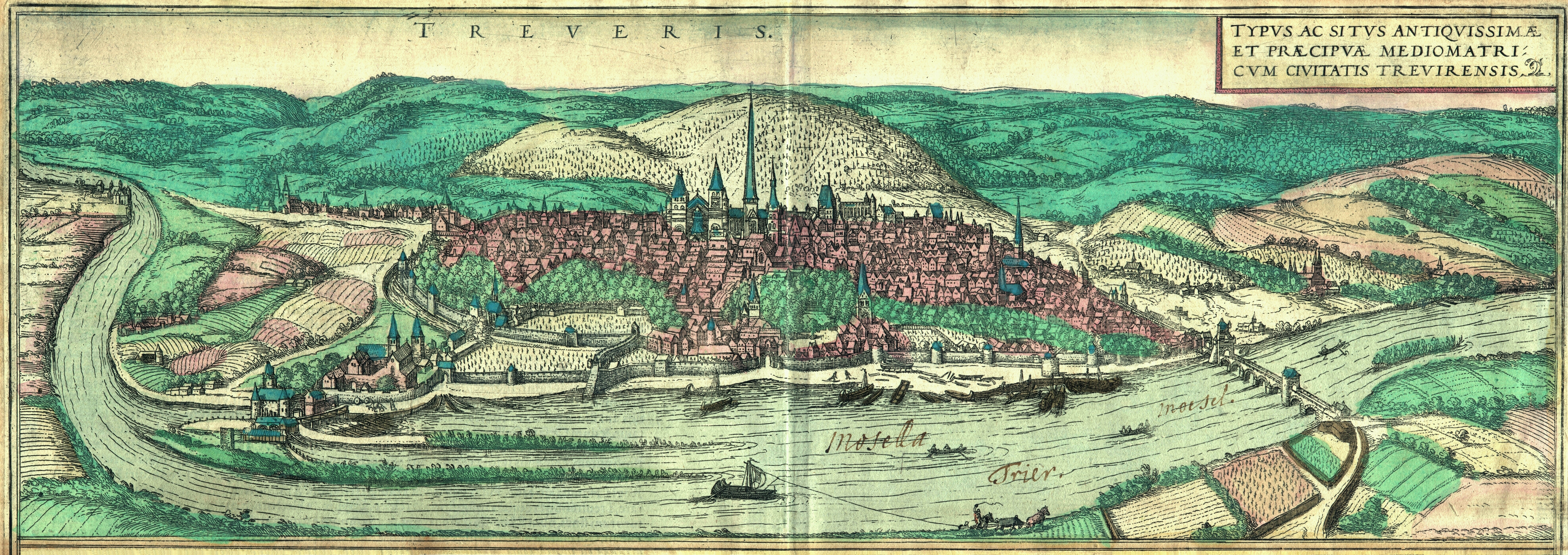
Historical view of Trier by Georg Braun & Frans Hogenberg: Civitates Orbis Terrarum, vol. 1, 1572.

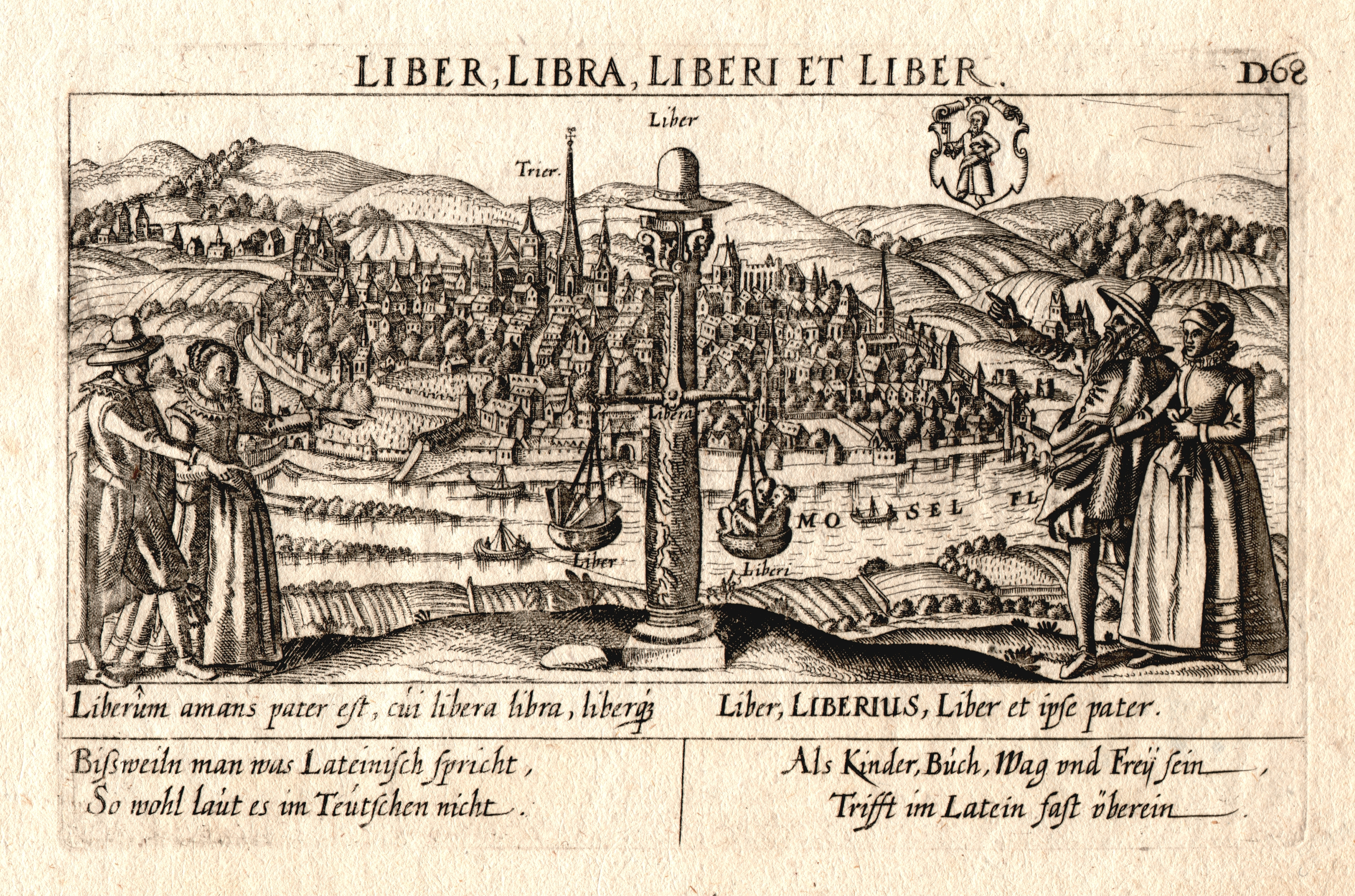
Engraving of Trier by Eberhard Kieser, from the Thesaurus philopoliticus (1625) by Daniel Meisner

In 1473, Emperor Frederick III and Charles the Bold, Duke of Burgundy convened in Trier. In this same year, the University of Trier was founded in the city.

From 1581 until 1593, intense witch persecutions, involving nobility as well as commoners, abounded throughout this region, leading to mass executions of hundreds of people.

In the 17th century, the Archbishops and Prince-Electors of Trier relocated their residences to Philippsburg Castle in Ehrenbreitstein, near Koblenz. A session of the Reichstag was held in Trier in 1512, during which the demarcation of the Imperial Circles was definitively established.

The Thirty Years' War (1618–1648) did initially not touch Trier. Warfare reached the city as part of the French–Habsburg rivalry and the conflict between townspeople and the archbishop Philipp Christoph von Sötern. The city asked the Spanish government in Luxemburg for help against the bishop's absolutist tendencies in 1630. While Spain sent troops and installed a garrison, the bishop used the aid of French troops to regain Trier two times in 1632 and 1645, interrupted by a surprise Spanish attack in 1635 and 10 years of Spanish occupation and imprisonment of the bishop, an event that served as a pretext to start the Franco-Spanish War. The cathedral chapter finally disempowered the bishop in 1649 using mercenaries and Lorrain troops against the bishop's French auxiliary forces.

Trier experienced peace until 1673 when French troops besieged and occupied the city. They fortified it heavily and destroyed all churches, abbeys and settlements in front of the city walls for military reasons. Despite their efforts, they were forced to leave by Imperial troops after the Battle of Konzer Brücke in 1675 In 1684, with the War of the Reunions, an era of French expansion began. Trier was again captured in 1684; all walls and fortresses were destroyed this time. After Trier and its associated electorate were yet again taken during the War of Palatinate Succession in 1688, many cities in the electorate were systematically destroyed in 1689 by the French Army. Nearly all castles were blown up and the only bridge across the Moselle in Trier was burnt. King Louis XIV of France personally issued the order for these acts of destruction but also gave the command to spare the city of Trier. As the French Army retreated in 1698, it left a starving city without walls and only 2,500 inhabitants.

During the War of the Spanish Succession in 1702, Trier was occupied again by a French army. In 1704-05 an allied Anglo-Dutch army commanded by the Duke of Marlborough passed Trier on its way to France. When the campaign failed, the French came back to Trier in 1705 and stayed until 1714. After a short period of peace, the War of the Polish Succession started in 1734; the following year Trier was again occupied by the French, who stayed until 1737. The last Prince-Elector, Clement Wenceslaus of Saxony, relocated to Koblenz in 1786. In August 1794, French Republican troops took Trier. This date marked the end of the era of the old electorate. Churches, abbeys and clerical possessions were sold or the buildings put to practical use, such as stables.

With the peace treaties of Basel and Campo Formio in 1797, German hegemonic powers Prussia and Austria ceded all German territories on the left bank of the Rhine river to France. Trier became a de facto French city. The University of Trier was dissolved in the same year. In 1798, it became the capital of the newly founded French Département de la Sarre. With the Treaty of Lunéville in 1801, Trier became also a de jure French city. In 1801, Napoleon Bonaparte signed a concordate with Pope Pius VII, thus stopping defamations of clerics and making Trier a diocese. Its territory was identical with the Département de la Sarre, much smaller than the Archbishopric of Trier had been until 1794. In 1802, the Frenchman Charles Mannay became first bishop of the new founded diocese and, in 1803, the first Holy Mass since 1794 was celebrated in the Cathedral of Trier. Emperor Napoleon visited Trier in 1804. In this time, French Trier began to prosper.

In 1814, the French era ended suddenly as Trier was taken by Prussian troops. After the defeat of Napoleon, the Franco-German borders of 1792 were restored in the 1814 and 1815 Paris peace treaties. The city was proclaimed part of the Kingdom of Prussia in 1815 and made part of the Grand Duchy of the Lower Rhine, with six administrative districts. Trier became seat of one these district administrations, the Regierungsbezirk Trier. Because of the new political situation and the new customs frontiers in the West, the economy of Trier began a steady decline that was to last until 1840. The Province of the Lower Rhine was merged into the Rhine Province in 1822.

The influential philosopher and revolutionary Karl Marx was born in Trier in 1818. His birthplace, the Karl-Marx-Haus, was opened in 1947 and renovated in 1983.

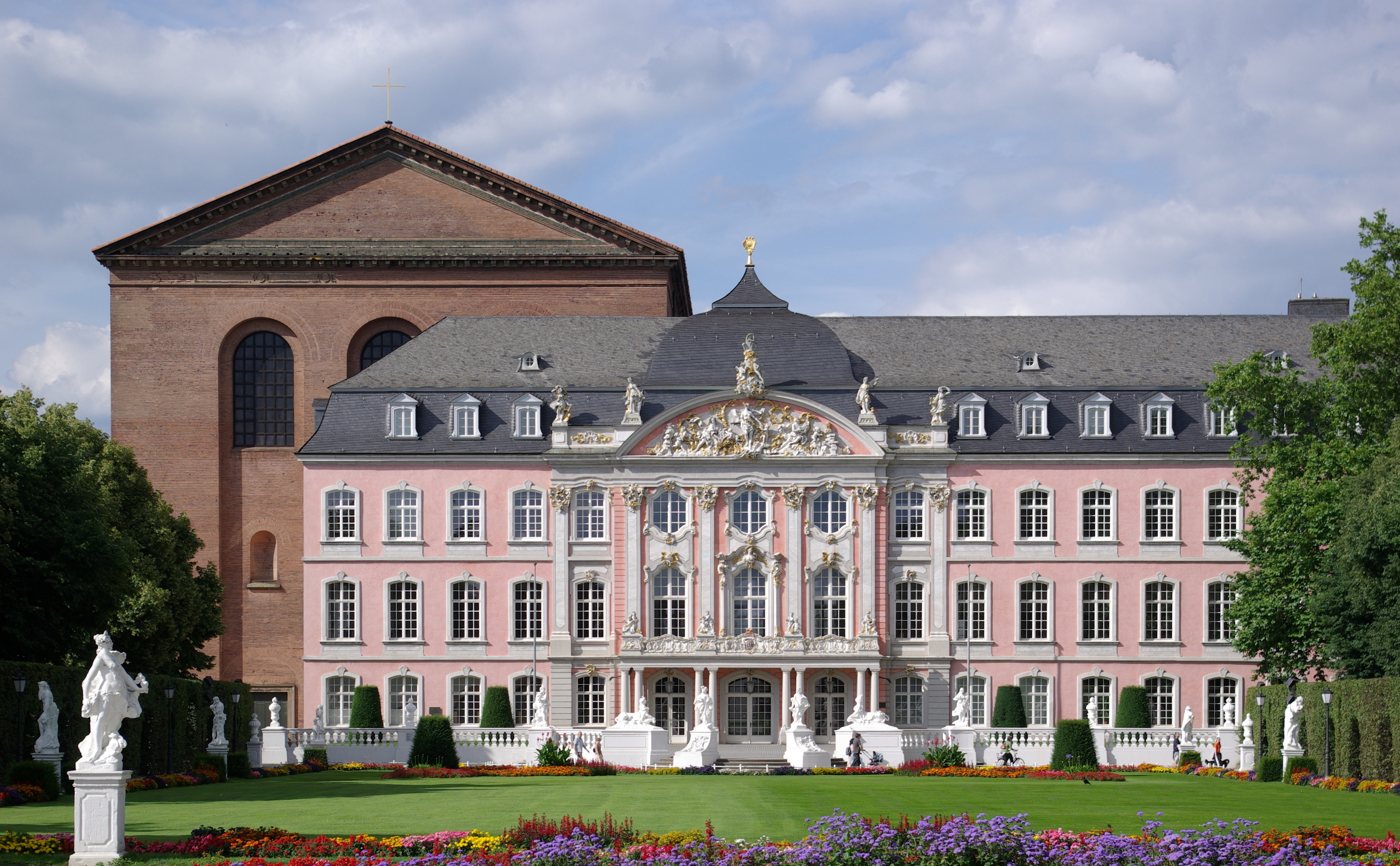
The Constantine Basilika and the Electoral Palace

From 1840 on, the situation of Trier began to improve as the neighbouring state of Luxembourg, an important market for Trier-made products, joined the German Customs Union in 1842. Trier, with a population of 15,500 at this time, produced mainly leather, cloth, wine and tobacco. Iron works were founded in Quint near Trier at this time. An important infrastructural improvement was the introduction of a shipping line operating with paddle-wheel steamers on the Moselle River, connecting Trier, Koblenz and Metz. The first railway line, linking Trier with Saarbrücken and Luxembourg was inaugurated in 1860, followed by the Trier-Cologne line across the Eifel in 1871 and the Moselle Railway to Koblenz in 1879. Minor lines to Bitburg via Irrel along the Sauer River, to Hermeskeil along the Ruwer River and the Moselbahn to Bullay (near Zell) were built later. A sign of increasing prosperity were the first trade fairs in modern Trier in 1840 and 1842.

During the revolutions of 1848 in the German states, Trier also saw protests and conflicts. The city council sent a letter to King Frederick William IV of Prussia, demanding more civic liberties. The lawyer Ludwig Simon was elected to represent Trier in the first German parliament in Frankfurt. After Prussian soldiers killed one citizen and wounded others in a melée, the situation escalated. The people of Trier hoisted black-red-gold flags as democratic symbols, rang the church bells, organized a militia and took away the signs of Prussian rule. A second melée between demonstrators and soldiers, which left two citizens dead, led to a collective outburst of fury. The people began to build barricades and wave the red flag. There were even reports that a statue of the Prussian king was smashed into pieces. Trier was on the eve of a civil war when the commander of the VIII Prussian army corps arrived and threatened to shell Trier. After being confronted with superior Prussian military power, the citizens gave up and removed the barricades. Some citizens were jailed for their democratic attitude; Ludwig Simon emigrated like many others and died in Switzerland. Trier became part of the German Empire during the Prussian-led unification of Germany in 1871.

== Second World War ==
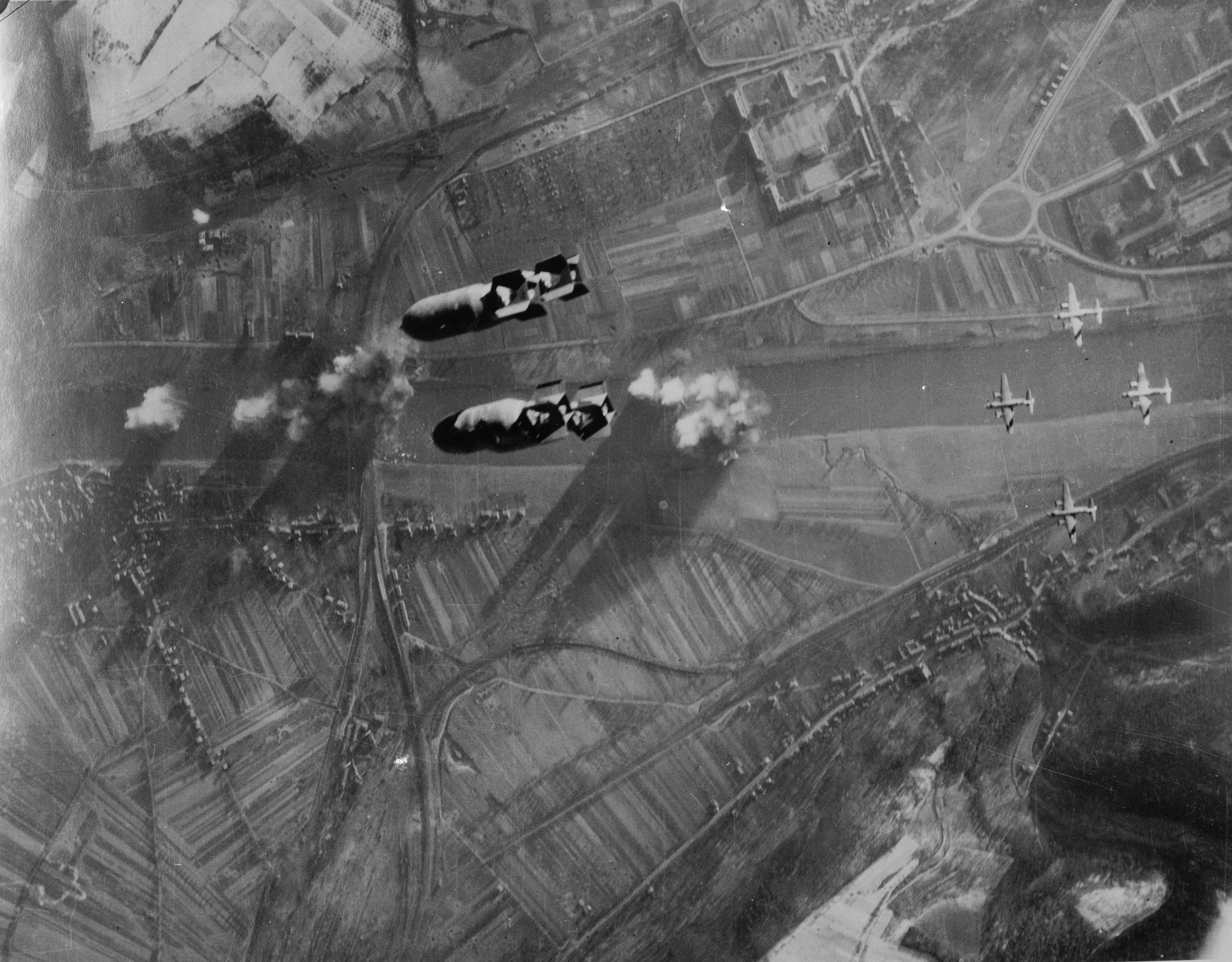
The railroad bridge in Trier-Pfalzel under attack, 1944

In September 1944 during the Second World War, Trier was only a short distance from the frontline fighting and was subjected to almost daily bombardment by American artillery. Allied forces carried out three large-scale aerial attacks on the city later in the same year. On December 19 at 15:30, 30 British Lancaster bombers dropped 136 tonnes of high-explosive bombs over Trier. Two days later, on December 21 at 14:35, 94 Lancasters and 47 American fighter-bombers dropped 427 tonnes of ordnance (high-explosive, incendiary and napalm bombs). Another two days after that, 700 tonnes of bombs were released over the city.

According to research by the historian Adolf Welter, at least 420 people were killed in the December 1944 attacks on Trier. Numerous buildings were damaged. During the entire war, 1,600 houses in the city were completely destroyed.

On March 2, 1945, the city surrendered to the U.S. 10th Armored Division with minimal resistance.

== Postwar period ==
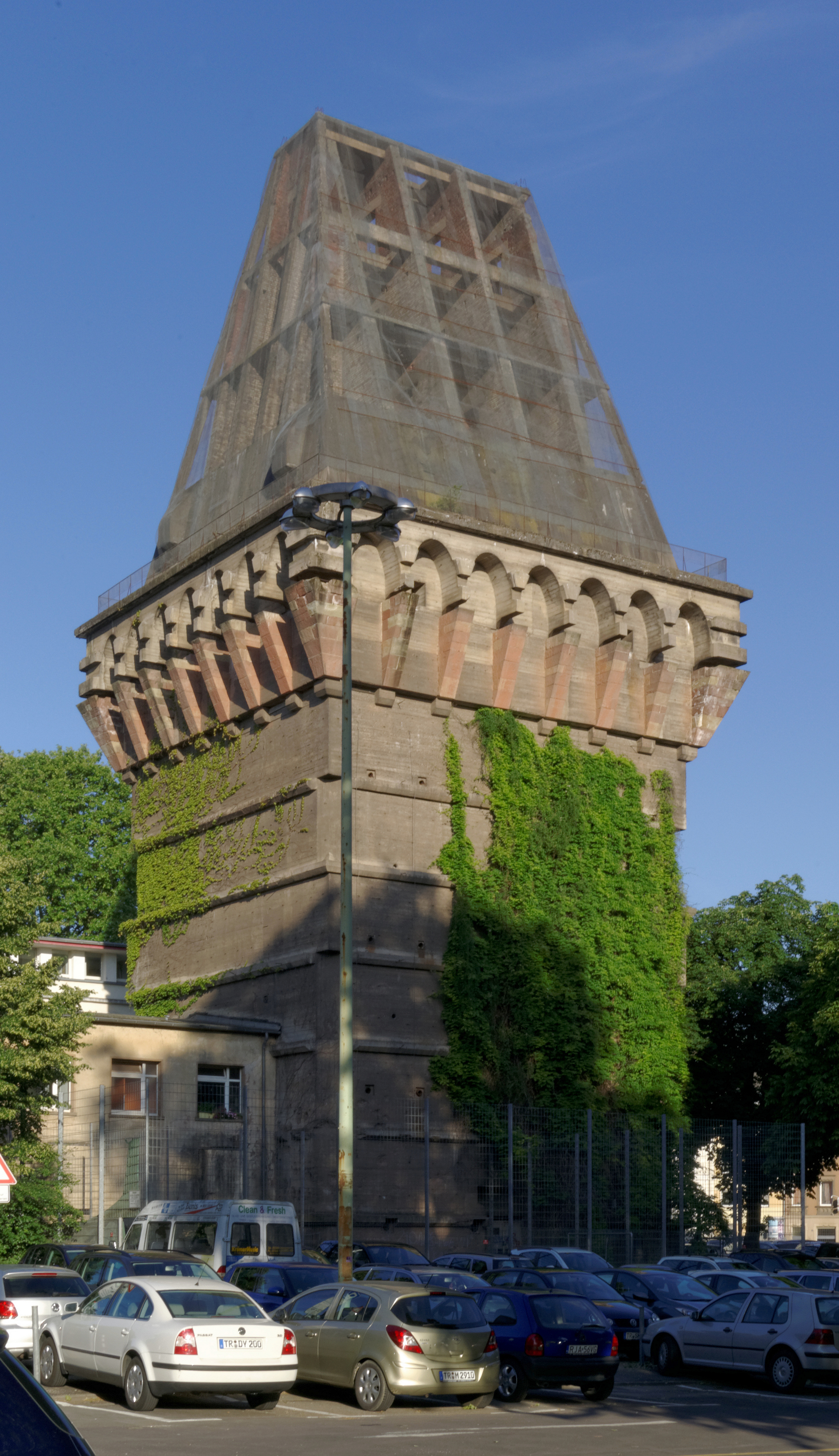
The air raid bunker (Hochbunker) built in 1942

At the end of April 1969, the old Roman road at the Porta Nigra was uncovered. Shortly afterward, on May 12, 1969, the open-air wildlife enclosure in the Weisshaus forest was opened. The University of Trier was reestablished in 1970, initially as part of the combined university of Trier-Kaiserslautern. The evolution of Trier as a university city took a further step forward with the opening on April 1, 1974, of the Martinskloster student residence halls. In 1975, the university once more became independent.

Other significant events of the 1970s include the discontinuation of the 99-year-old "Trierische Landeszeitung" newspaper on March 31, 1974, and the reopening of the restored Cathedral of Trier on May 1 of that same year.

From May 24 to 27 1984, Trier officially celebrated its 2,000th anniversary. In 1986, Roman Trier (the amphitheater, Barbara Baths, Imperial Baths, Constantine Basilica, Igel Column, Porta Nigra, Roman bridge, Dom St. Peter and Liebfrauenkirche) was declared a UNESCO World Heritage Site titled "Roman Monuments, Cathedral of St. Peter and Church of Our Lady in Trier." Another cultural heritage site is St. Paulinus' Church, designed by Balthasar Neumann. During construction of an underground parking lot in October 1988, remnants of Roman fresco paintings were discovered beneath the Viehmarkt. On November 5, the Trier Observatory was officially inaugurated. In the course of excavation work on a further subterranean garage near the Roman bridge, a collection of 2,558 Roman gold coins was discovered on September 9, 1993. The coins have an estimated value of 2.5 million Euro.

From April 22 to October 24, 2004, the State Garden Show was held on the Petrisberg heights and attracted 724,000 visitors.

A new discovery of Roman remains was made in April 2006, when traces of building walls were unearthed during demolition works in the city centre.

A large exhibition on the Roman Emperor Constantine the Great was the largest exhibition in Trier up to date. It ran from the 2nd of June to the 4th of November 2007. Some 1,600 pieces lend by 160 museums in 20 countries were on exhibit in three museums in Trier. In all 353,974 tickets were sold and all three museums counted 799,034 visitors, making it one of the most successful exhibitions in Germany. The Ehrang/Quint district of Trier was heavily damaged and flooded during the July 16, 2021 floods of Germany, Belgium, The Netherlands and Luxembourg.

== Incorporation of municipalities ==
Formerly autonomous municipalities and territories that have been incorporated into the city of Trier. Some localities had already formed part of the urban area between 1798 and 1851. In 1798, the city area covered a total of 8.9 square kilometres.

Year	Localities
1888	St. Paulin, Maar, Zurlauben, Löwenbrücken, St. Barbara
1888	Separation of Heiligkreuz and Olewig
1912	Pallien (southern part), Heiligkreuz, St. Matthias, St. Medard, Feyen (with Weismark)
1930	Euren, Biewer, Pallien (northern part), Kürenz, Olewig
June 7, 1969	Ehrang-Pfalzel (formed on March 1, 1968, through unification of the two previously autonomous municipalities)
June 7, 1969	Eitelsbach, Filsch, Irsch, Kernscheid, Ruwer, Tarforst, Zewen

== Population development ==
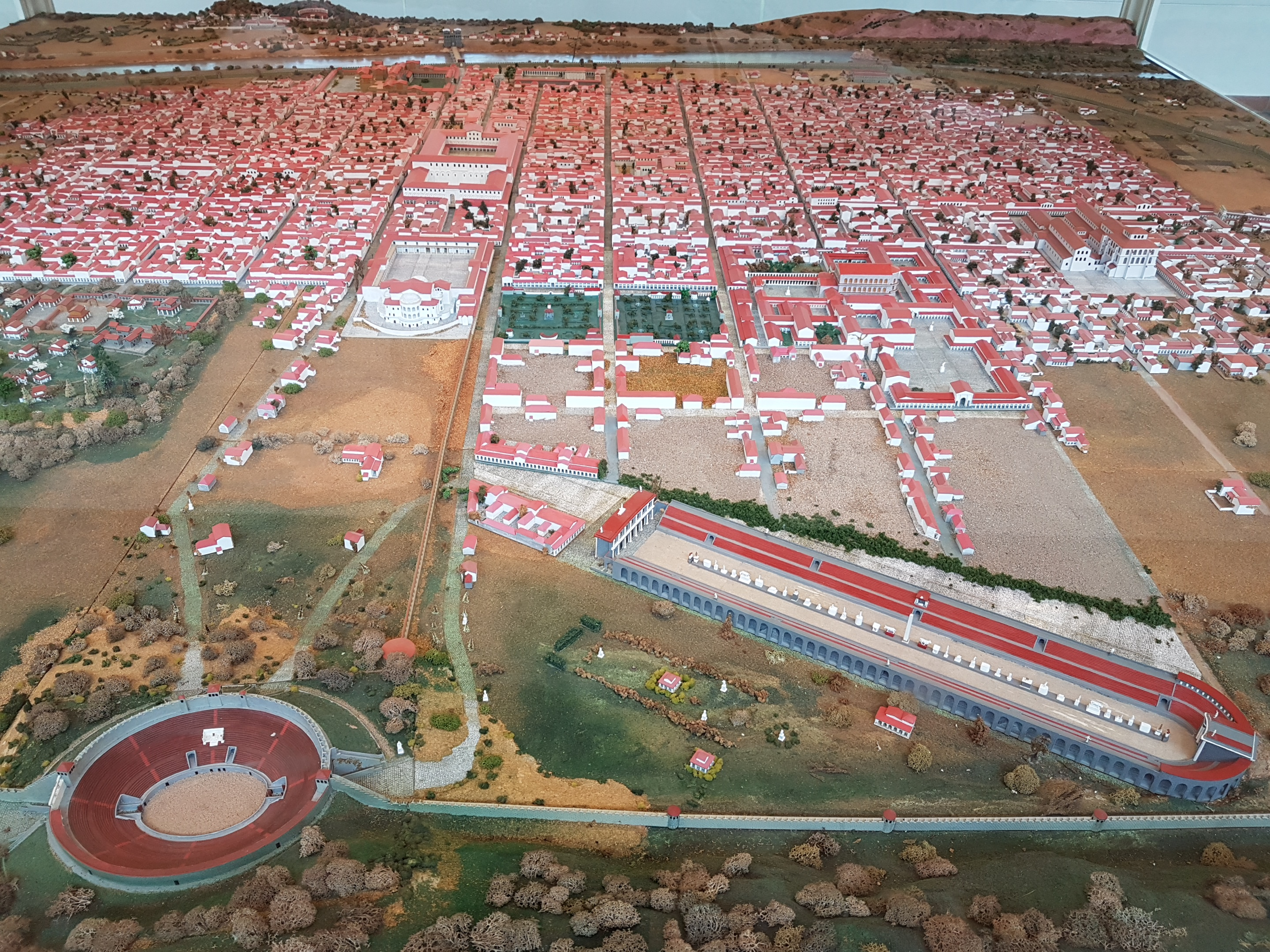
Scale model Roman city

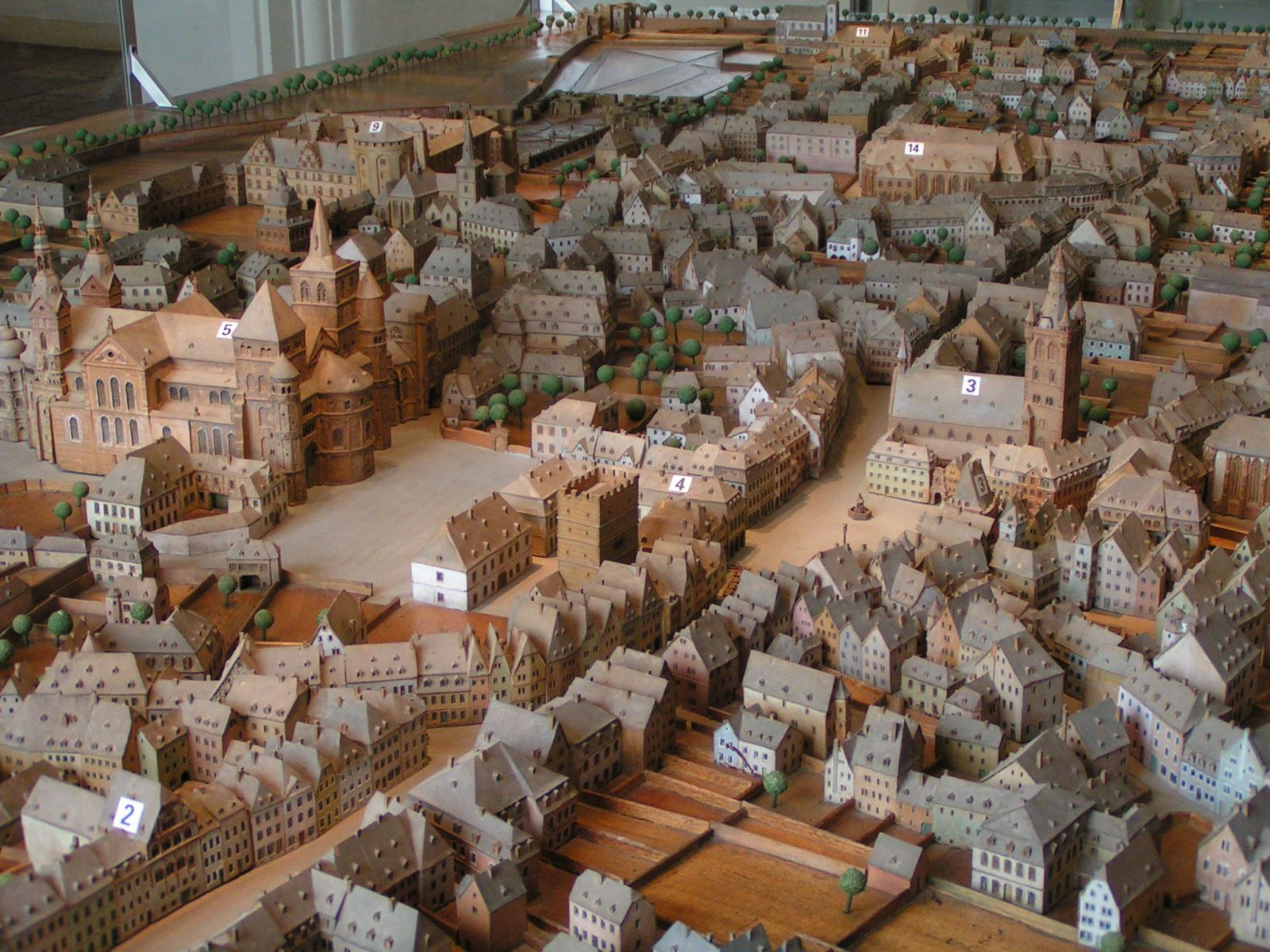
Scale model around 1800

At the beginning of the 4th century AD, Trier was the residence of the Roman Emperor and, with an estimated 80,000 inhabitants, the largest city north of the Alps. Through the Middle Ages and up until the start of the Modern Age, numerous wars, epidemics and famines caused the city's population to drop to only 2,677 in 1697. The population began to increase once more in the course of the 18th century, reaching 8,829 in 1801. The onset of industrialisation in the 19th century accelerated this growth. In 1900, the city was home to over 43,000 people. By 1939, this figure had doubled to over 88,000.

The Second World War cost Trier roughly 35% of its population (30,551 people) and the number of inhabitants had dropped to 57,000 by 1945. Only through the incorporation of several surrounding localities into the city on June 7, 1969, did the population once more reach its prewar level. This reorganisation in fact pushed the number of inhabitants beyond the 100,000 mark, which accorded the city of Trier Großstadt status. On June 30, 2005, the population of Trier according to official records of the Rhineland-Palatinate state authorities was 99,685 (registered only by Hauptwohnsitz and after comparison with other regional authorities).

The following overview illustrates the city's different population levels, according to the current size of the city area. Up until 1801, these figures are mostly estimates; after this date they have been sourced from census results or official records of state authorities. From 1871 onwards, these statistics correspond to the "present population", from 1925 to the "resident population" and from 1987 to the "population resident at main domicile". Prior to 1871, the population was recorded using inconsistent survey methods.

Year	Population
100	20,000
300	80,000
400	70,000
1363	10,000
1542	8,500
1613	6,000
1697	2,677
1702	4,200
1801	8,829
December 1, 1831 ¹	14,723
December 1, 1840 ¹	15,717
December 3, 1855 ¹	20,172
December 1, 1858 ¹	20,060
December 1, 1871 ¹	21,442
December 1, 1875 ¹	22,100

Year	Population
December 1, 1880 ¹	24,200
December 1, 1885 ¹	26,126
December 1, 1890 ¹	36,166
December 2, 1895 ¹	40,026
December 1, 1900 ¹	43,506
December 1, 1905 ¹	46,709
December 1, 1910 ¹	49,112
December 1, 1916 ¹	47,107
December 5, 1917 ¹	45,709
October 8, 1919 ¹	53,248
June 16, 1925 ¹	57,341
June 16, 1933 ¹	76,692
May 17, 1939 ¹	88,150
December 31, 1945	57,599
October 29, 1946 ¹	63,420

Year	Population
September 13, 1950 ¹	75,526
September 25, 1956 ¹	84,869
June 6, 1961 ¹	87,141
December 31, 1965	86,808
May 27, 1970 ¹	103,724
December 31, 1975	100,338
December 31, 1980	95,536
December 31, 1985	93,472
May 25, 1987 ¹	94,118
December 31, 1990	97,835
December 31, 1995	99,428
December 31, 2000	99,410
June 30, 2005	99,685
December 19, 2006	101,685
December 31, 2020	110,674

¹ Census figure

== Literature ==
- Christoffel, Edgar: Krieg am Westwall 1944/45. Trier, Akademische Buchhandlung 1989. ISBN 3-88915-033-0
- Clemens, Gabriele; Clemens; Lukas: Geschichte der Stadt Trier. Munich 2007, ISBN 3-406-55618-3.
- Dehio, Georg: Handbuch der deutschen Kunstdenkmäler: Rheinland-Pfalz, Saarland. 2nd revised edition, Munich, Deutscher Kunstverlag 1984. pp. 1024–1084. ISBN 3-422-00382-7
- Gwatkin, William E. Jr. (October 1933). "Roman Trier". The Classical Journal. 29 (1): 3–12.
- Heise, Karl A.: Die alte Stadt und die neue Zeit. Stadtplanung und Denkmalpflege Triers im 19. und 20. Jahrhundert. Trier, Paulinus 1999. ISBN 3-87760-107-3
- King, Anthony: Roman Gaul and Germany (Exploring the Roman World). University of California Press 1990. ISBN 0-520-06989-7
- Kuhnen, Hans-Peter (ed.): Das roemische Trier. Stuttgart, Konrad Theiss 2001. ISBN 3-923319-85-1
- Monz, Heinz (ed.): Trierer biographisches Lexikon. Wissenschaftlicher Verlag Trier, Trier 2000. ISBN 3-88476-400-4
- Petzold, Hans (ed.): Trier - 2000 Jahre Stadtentwicklung. Katalog zur Ausstellung Tuchfabrik Weberbach 6.5. - 10.11.1984. Ed. by Baudezernat der Stadt Trier. Trier, City printing office 1984.
- Resmini, Bertram: Das Erzbistum Trier (Germania Sacra, Vol. 31). Walter De Gruyter Inc. 1993. ISBN 3-11-013657-0
- Schnitzius, Sebastian: Entwicklung der Eisenbahn im Trierer Raum. Trier, Deutsche Bundesbahn 1984.
- Trier. Augustusstadt der Treverer. Stadt und Land in vor- und fruehroemischer Zeit. 2nd ed. Mainz 1984, ISBN 3-8053-0792-6.
- Universitaet Trier: 2000 Jahre Trier. 3 volumes, Spee-Verlag, Trier.
  - Heinz Heinen: Trier und das Trevererland in roemischer Zeit. 1985, ISBN 3-87760-065-4.
  - Hans-Hubert Anton / Alfred Haverkamp (ed.): Trier im Mittelalter. 1996, ISBN 3-87760-066-2.
  - Kurt Duewell / Franz Irsigler (ed.): Trier in der Neuzeit. 1988, ISBN 3-87760-067-0.
- Welter, Adolf: Die Luftangriffe auf Trier 1939-1945. Ein Beitrag zur Geschichte des Trierer Landes. Trierer Muenzfreunde 1995. ISBN 3-923575-13-0
- Welter, Adolf: Die Luftangriffe auf Trier im Ersten Weltkrieg 1914-1918. Trierer Muenzfreunde 2001. ISBN 3-923575-19-X
- Welter, Adolf: Trier 1939-1945. Neue Forschungsergebnisse zur Stadtgeschichte. Trier 1998
- Welter, Adolf: Bild-Chronik Trier in der Besatzungszeit 1918-1930. Ein Beitrag zur Geschichte des Trierer Landes. Trierer Muenzfreunde 1992. ISBN 3-923575-11-4
- Welter, Adolf: Der Flugplatz Trier-Euren. Vom kaiserlichen Exerzierfeld zum heutigen Industriegebiet. Trierer Muenzfreunde 2004. ISBN 3-923575-20-3
- Wightman, Edith M.: Roman Trier and the Treveri. London, Brecon 1970. ISBN 0-246-63980-6
- Zenz, Emil: Die Stadt Trier im 20. Jahrhundert, 1. Haelfte 1900-1950. Trier, Spee 1981. ISBN 3-87760-608-3
- Zuche, Thomas (ed.): Stattfuehrer – Trier im Nationalsozialismus. 3rd ed. 1997. ISBN 3-87760-057-3

There is not much literature in English on Trier. The three volumes on Trier's history published by the history department of the University of Trier between 1985 and 1996 represent a complete history including all researches up to the time when they were published. Clemens' 2007 book (Clemens is a history professor of Trier University, earlier he worked at the Roman Museum in Trier) can be viewed as an update.
