= Valerius of Trèves =

Saint Valerius of Trier
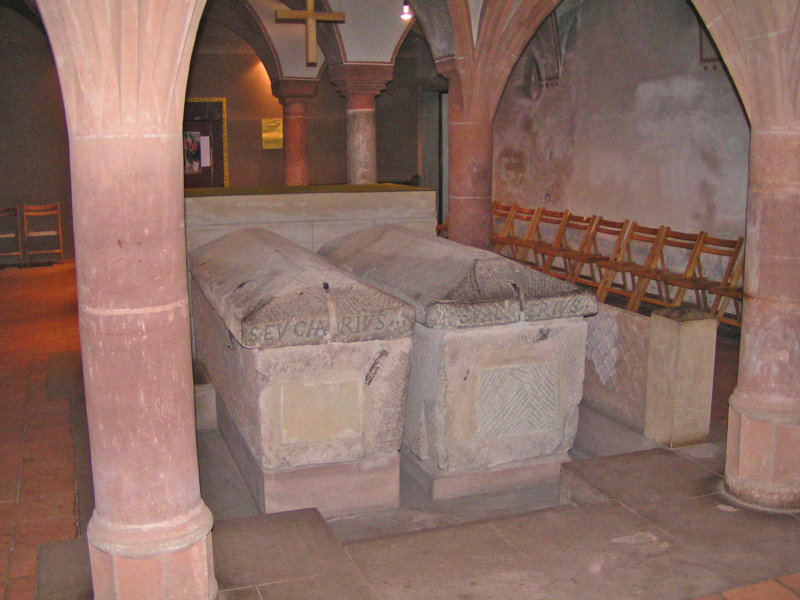
- Tombs of Saints Eucharius and Valerius. St. Matthias Abbey, Trier.
- Died: c. 320 AD
- Venerated in: Roman Catholic Church, Orthodox Church
- Feast: January 29

Saint Valerius of Treves (†320) was a semi-legendary Bishop of Trier. His feast day is 29 January.

== Legend ==
According to an ancient legend, St. Valerius was a follower of Saint Eucharius, the first bishop of Trier. Eucharius was sent to Gaul by Saint Peter as bishop, together with the deacon Valerius and the subdeacon Maternus, to preach the Gospel.

They came to the Rhine and to Ellelum in Alsace, where Maternus died. His two companions hastened back to St. Peter and begged him to restore the dead man to life. St. Peter gave his pastoral staff to Eucharius, and, upon being touched with it, Maternus, who had been in his grave for forty days, returned to life. The Gentiles then converted in large numbers. After founding many churches the three companions went to Trier where evangelizing progressed so rapidly that Eucharius chose that city for his episcopal residence. An angel announced to him his approaching death and pointed out Valerius as his successor.

Valerius was bishop for fifteen years and was succeeded by Maternus, who had in the meantime founded the dioceses of Cologne and Tongeren, remaining Bishop for forty years. The staff of St. Peter, with which he had been raised to life, was preserved at Cologne till the end of the tenth century when the upper half was presented to Trier and was afterwards taken to Prague by Emperor Charles IV.

== Traditions ==
In medieval times the foundation of a diocese was often referred to as early a date as possible, in order thereby to increase its reputation, perhaps also its rights. In time, especially through the ravages of the Normans, the more reliable earlier accounts were lost. When at a later period the lives of primitive holy founders, e. g. the saints of ancient Trier, came to be written anew, the gaps in tradition were filled out with various combinations and fanciful legends. In this way there originated in the monastery of St. Matthias near Trier the famous chronicle of Trier, the Gesta Treverorum, in which there is a curious mixture of truth and error. It contains the account of the life of St. Eucharius given above. An amplification thereof, containing the lives of the three saints in question, is said to have been written by the monk Goldscher or Golscher, who lived in that monastery about the year 1130. From the "Gesta" the narrative passed unchallenged into numerous medieval works. Later criticism has detected many contradictions and inaccuracies in these ancient records, and it is almost universally believed at present that, with few exceptions, the first Christian missionaries came to Gaul, to which Trier then belonged, not earlier than about 250. Following Hontheim, Calmet and others, the Bollandists, with Marx, Aloys Lütolf, and other historians refer these bishops of Trier to a period following 250, though not all of them consider this as fully established.

Valerius appears in the Calendar of Willibrord among the saints of January.

== Notes ==
Titles of the Great Christian Church
Preceded by Eucharius	Bishop of Trier; 250 – 300	Succeeded by Maternus
