= Eucharius =

Bishop of Trier

Saint Eucharius
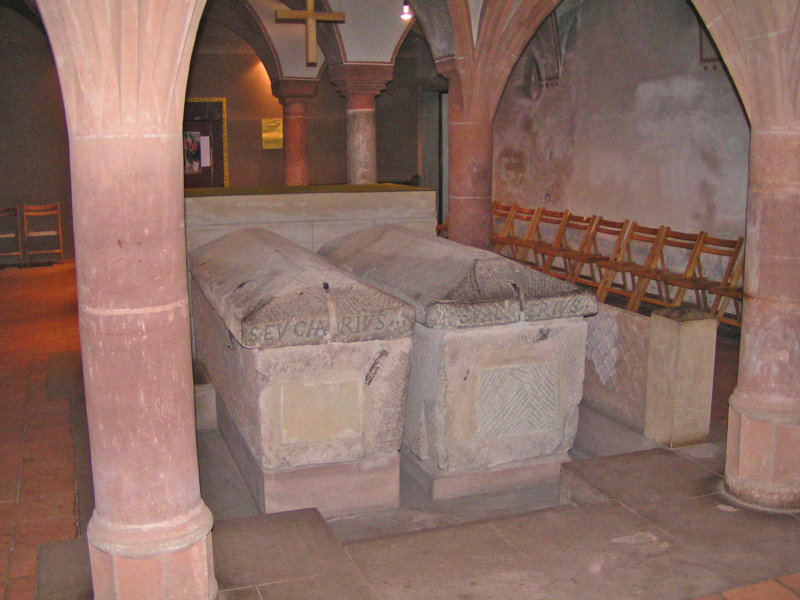
- Tombs of Saints Eucharius and Valerius, St. Matthias' Abbey, Trier.
- Died: ~250 AD
- Venerated in: Roman Catholic Church, Orthodox Church, True Orthodox Church
- Feast: December 8

Saint Eucharius is venerated as the first bishop of Trier. He lived in the second half of the 3rd century.

== Narrative ==
According to an ancient legend, he was one of the seventy-two disciples of Christ, and was sent to Gaul by Saint Peter as bishop, together with the deacon Valerius and the subdeacon Maternus, to preach the Gospel.

They came to the Rhine and to Ellelum in Alsace, where Maternus died. His two companions hastened back to St. Peter and begged him to restore the dead man to life. St. Peter gave his pastoral staff to Eucharius, and, upon being touched with it, Maternus, who had been in his grave for forty days, returned to life. For this reason, the staff has become the distinctive mark of an envoy, especially a missionary.

The Gentiles were then converted in large numbers. After founding many churches the three companions went to Trier where the work of evangelization progressed so rapidly that Eucharius chose that city for his episcopal residence. Among other miracles related is the legend that he raised a dead person to life. An angel announced to him his approaching death and pointed out Valerius as his successor. Eucharius died on December 8, having been bishop for twenty-five years, and was interred in the church of St. John outside the city.

Valerius was bishop for fifteen years and was succeeded by Maternus, who had in the meantime founded the dioceses of Cologne and Tongeren, being bishop altogether for forty years. The staff of St. Peter, with which he had been raised to life, was preserved at Cologne until the end of the 10th century when the upper half was presented to Trier, and was afterwards taken to Prague by Emperor Charles IV.

But this legend is inconsistent, since the three saints mentioned were bishops in dioceses founded more than a century after the existence of Peter.

== Veneration and traditions ==
In the Middle Ages the foundation of a diocese was often referred to as early a date as possible, in order thereby to increase its reputation, and perhaps also its rights. In time, especially through the ravages of the Normans, the more reliable earlier accounts were lost. When at a later period the lives of primitive holy founders, e. g. the saints of ancient Trier, came to be written anew, the gaps in tradition were filled out with various combinations and fanciful legends. In this way there originated in the monastery of St. Matthias near Trier the famous chronicle of Trier, the Gesta Treverorum, in which there is a curious mixture of truth and error. It contains the account of the life of St. Eucharius given above. An amplification thereof, containing the lives of the three saints in question, is said to have been written by the monk Goldscher or Golscher, who lived in that monastery about the year 1130. From the "Gesta" the narrative passed unchallenged into numerous medieval works. Later criticism has detected many contradictions and inaccuracies in these ancient records, and it is almost universally believed at present that, with few exceptions, the first Christian missionaries came to Gaul, to which Trier then belonged, not earlier than about 250. Following Hontheim, Calmet and others, the Bollandists, with Marx, Aloys Lütolf, and other historians refer these bishops of Trier to a period following 250, though not all of them consider this as fully established. The feast of St. Eucharius is celebrated on 8 December.

St. Matthias' Abbey was originally named after Saint Eucharius, whose tomb is in the crypt, but was renamed when the abbey acquired relics of the apostle. The Abbey of Echternach was closely linked to St. Matthias through their respective monastic communities. The cult and liturgy of Eucharius was well established in Echternach.

== See also ==
- Saint Eucharius, patron saint archive

Titles of the Great Christian Church
Preceded by N/A	Archbishop of Trier; 250 – 250	Succeeded by Valerius
