= Rohrer =

Rohrer is a surname. Notable people with the surname include:

- Anna Rohrer (born 1997), American long distance runner
- Anneliese Rohrer (born 1944), Austrian journalist
- Ben Rohrer (born 1981), Australian cricketer
- Franz Rohrer (1832–1882), Swiss historical scholar
- Gertrude Martin Rohrer (1875–1968), American composer
- Heinrich Rohrer (1933–2013), Swiss physicist
- Jason Rohrer (born 1977), American computer programmer, writer, musician and game designer
- Jeff Rohrer (born 1958), American football linebacker
- Matthew Rohrer (born 1970), American poet
- Megan Rohrer (born 1980), American pastor and activist
- Raphael Rohrer (born 1985), Liechtenstein footballer
- Sam Rohrer (born 1955), American businessman and politician
- Seraina Rohrer (born 1977), Swiss film festival director and academic
- William Rohrer (1892–?), American baseball player
- William G. Rohrer (1909–1989), American businessman and politician
