= Franz Rohrer =

Historical scholar of Switzerland

Franz Rohrer (18 November 1832 – 3 September 1882) was a historical scholar of Switzerland. He was born at Stanz in 1832, and studied theology at the universities of Freiburg and Tubingen. He was ordained in 1856, and was for some time pastor of Kerns. His chief attention, however, was given to historical research, which his subsequent position as librarian at St. Gall enabled him to prosecute with greater freedom. After the death of Dr. Liitolf he became president of the Historical Society of the Five Cantons and editor of the Geschichtsfreund. He was also one of the most active members of the Swiss Geschichts forschende Gesellschaft, and undertook its continuation. of the great historical work left incomplete by Kopp, and afterwards by Litolf, the Geschichte der eidgensssischen Bunde, of which a new volume lately appeared, under his care, bringing down the history to the peace of Austria with Lucerne and the Forest Cantons (1330-36). After serving as rector of the gymnasium at Altdorf, he was made a canon of the Stiftskirche at Luzerne in 1873, where he died in September 1882. He described himself to the last as a theologian of the "Richtung der Lacordaire."

This article incorporates public domain material from McClintock, John; Strong, James (1867–1887). Cyclopædia of Biblical, Theological and Ecclesiastical Literature. Harper and Brothers.
