= Leonhard von Spengel =

German classical scholar

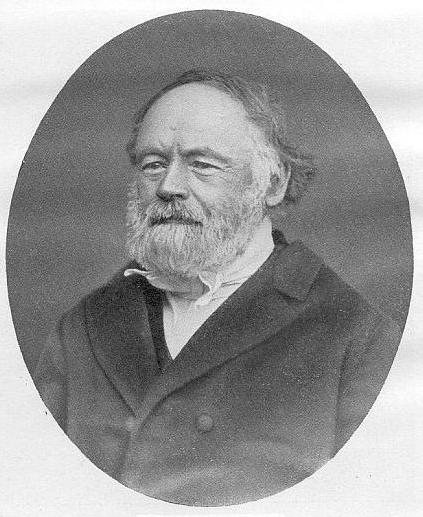
Leonhard von Spengel

Leonhard von Spengel (24 September 1803, in Munich – 8 November 1880, in Munich) was a German classical scholar.

== Biography ==
He attended the lyceum in his hometown, where being a pupil of Joseph Kopp and Johann von Gott Fröhlich, he was encouraged to study philology. After taking the examination for secondary school teachers in 1823, he furthered his studies in classical philology at Leipzig University and the Friedrich Wilhelm University of Berlin, receiving his PhD at the Ludwig-Maximilians-Universität München in 1827. He became known through his edition (1826) of Varro's De Lingua Latina and subsequently was appointed lector. As a university student, his influences were Gottfried Hermann (Leipzig University) and August Boeckh and Immanuel Bekker (Friedrich Wilhelm University of Berlin). He turned down an offer of a professorship from Kiel University, and from 1830 taught classes as a gymnasium professor in Munich. From 1842 to 1847, he was professor at Heidelberg University, and afterwards returned to Munich as a university professor.

In 1841, he became a full member of the Bavarian Academy of Sciences.

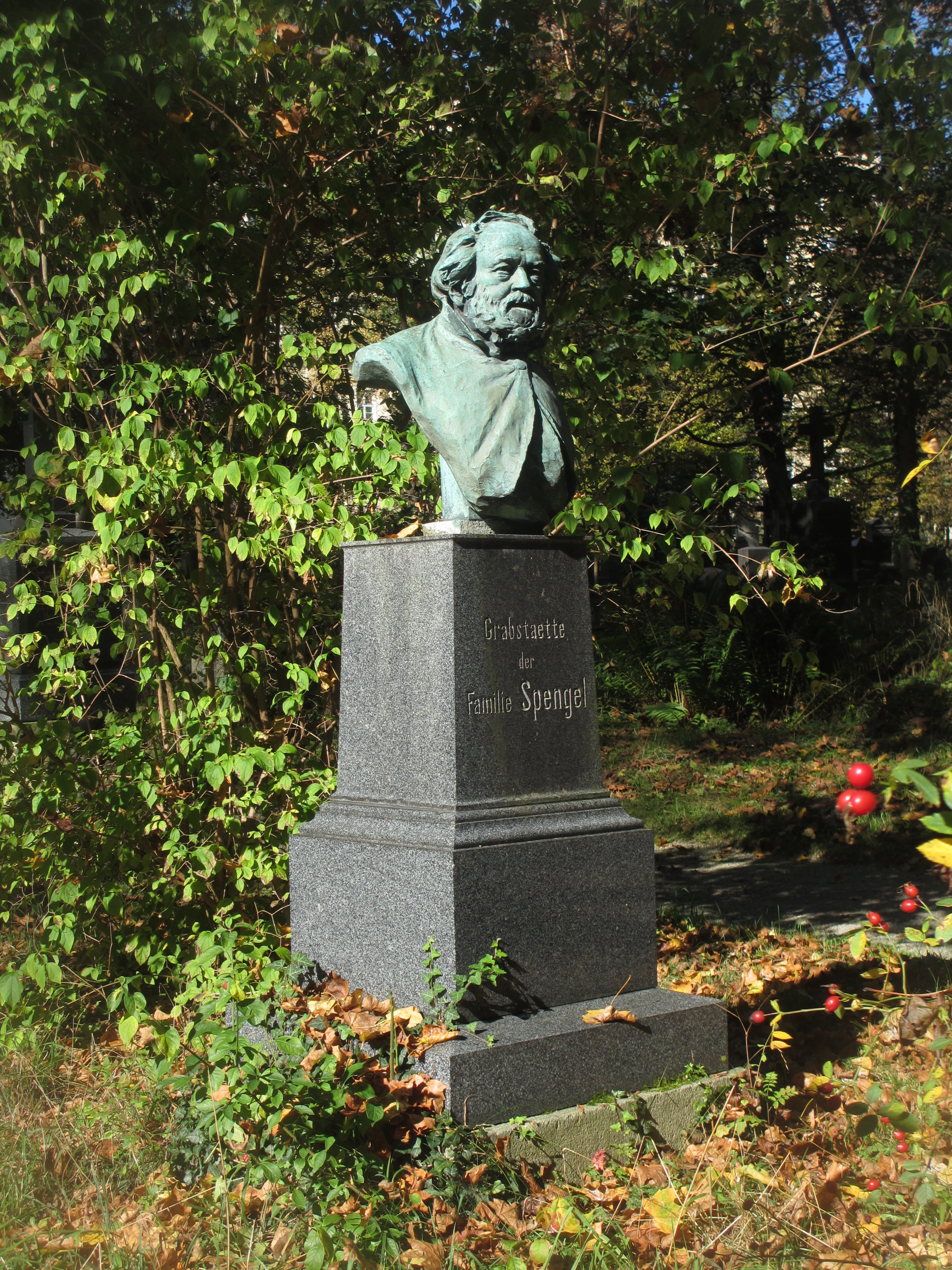
Gravesite of Spengel at the Alter Südfriedhof in Munich

== Published works ==
Among his publications were his edition of the Ars Rhetorica ad Alexandrum, which, following Petrus Victorius, he attributed to Anaximenes of Lampsacus (1844), his edition of the Rhetoric of Aristotle (1867), and his text edition of the Rhetores Graeci (three volumes, 1853–56). His address Ueber das Studium der Rhetorik bei den Alten (1842) is a valuable outline sketch of the art of eloquence in classical times.

== Bibliography ==
- J. E. Sandys, A History of Classical Scholarship, volume III (Cambridge, 1908)
