= Trebeta =

Legendary founder

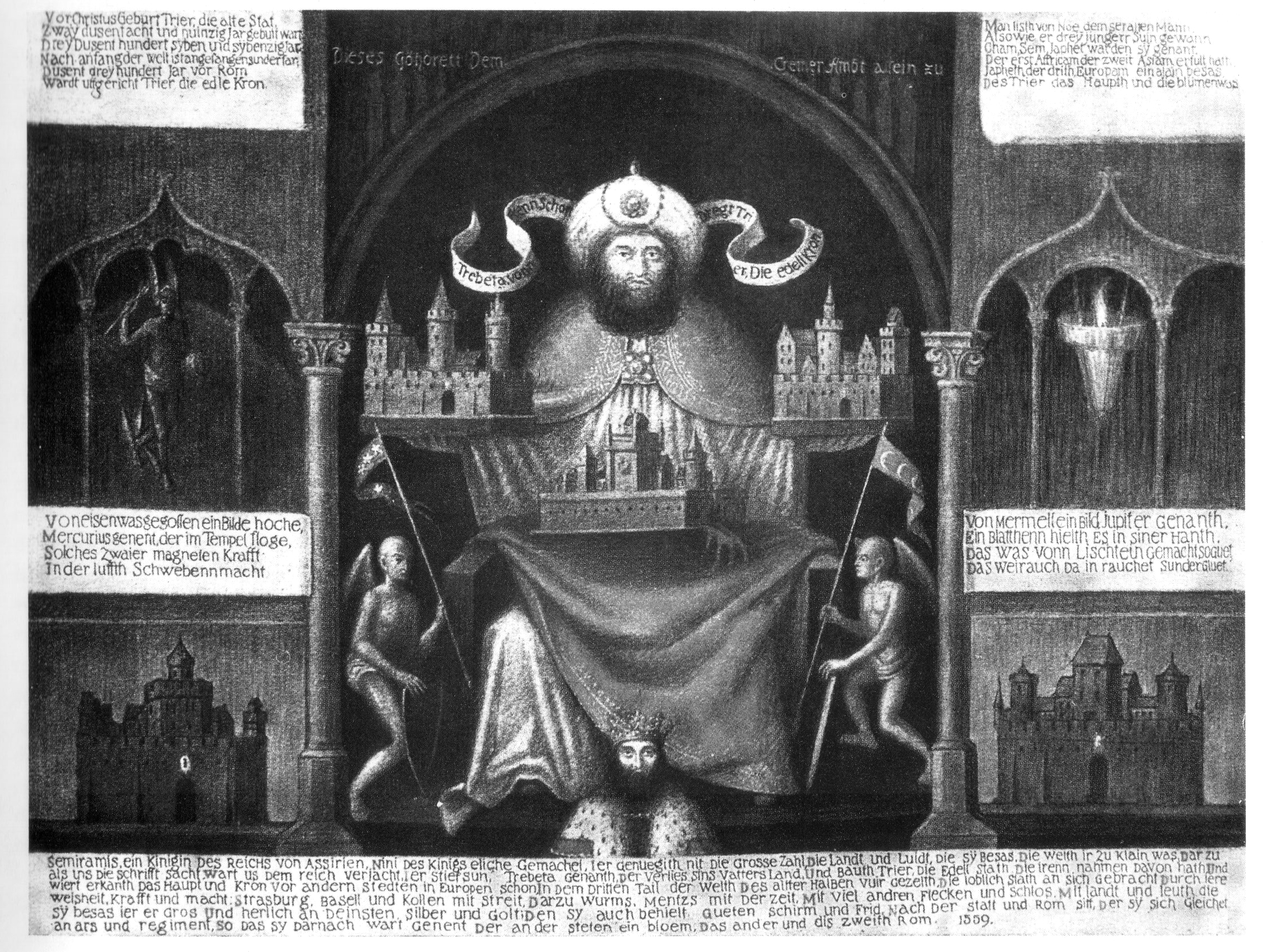
1559 painting depicting Trebeta, destroyed in World War II.

Trebeta was the legendary founder of Trier according to the Gesta Treverorum.

According to a legend recorded in the 12th century, Deeds of the Treveri, the city was founded by a mythological-unrecorded prince of Assyria named Trebeta, placing the city's founding legend independent of and centuries before ancient Rome's.

Trebeta's parents were said to have been Ninus, a legendary "King of Assyria" invented by the ancient Greeks (first mentioned by Ctesias), and an unknown mother who was Ninus's wife before Semiramis. Semiramis took control of the kingdom upon his father's death and Trebeta was forced into exile, wandering through Europe before settling at Trier. His body was said to have been cremated on Petrisberg. However, there is no historical evidence that the Assyrians or an Assyrian prince named Trebeta crossed into Europe from the Middle East in Assyrian records of the time.

The German historian Johannes Aventinus disputed that Trebeta (whom he called Trever or Treiber) was the son of Ninus, claiming that he was in fact a son of Ninus' contemporary Mannus, who was supposedly the second king of Germany. Aventinus also credited Trever with building settlements at Metz, Mainz, Basel, Strasbourg, Speyer and Worms.
