= Maternus of Cologne =

Roman Catholic saint

Saint Maternus
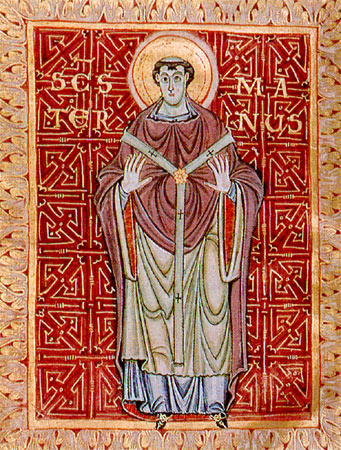
- Born: c. 285
- Died: September 14, 315
- Venerated in: Catholic Church; Eastern Orthodox Church
- Feast: September 14

Maternus (c. 285 – September 14, 315 AD), also known as Maternus II, was the first known bishop of Cologne, reportedly also the third bishop of Trier, and founder of the diocese of Tongeren. He is venerated as a saint in the Catholic and Eastern Orthodox churches. The Basilica of Saint Maternus in Walcourt, Belgium was allegedly founded by him.

== Life ==
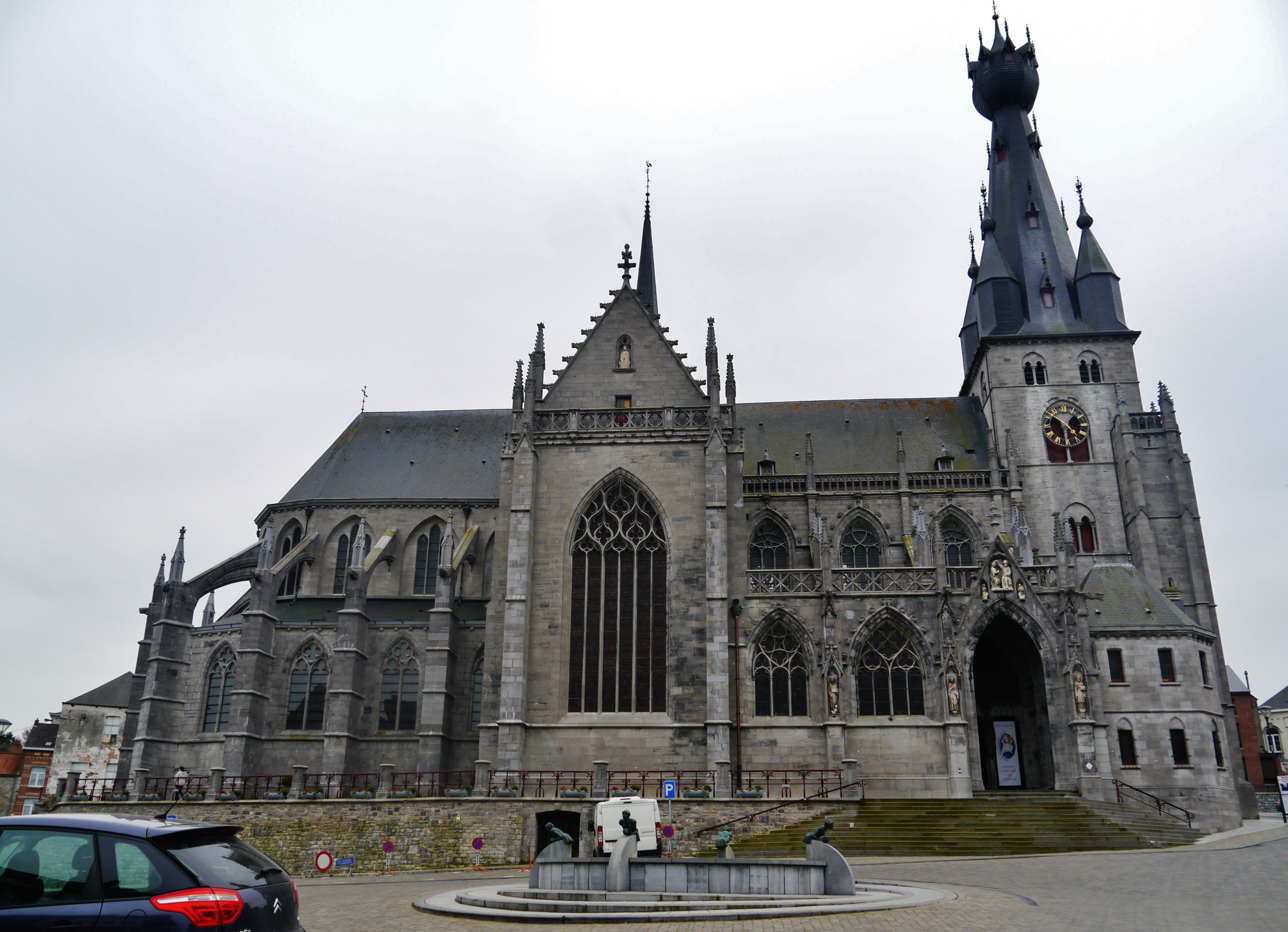
The Basilica of Saint Maternus in Walcourt, Belgium was founded by Maternus, according to legend

According to Eusebius, Bishop Maternus was active during the period of the Donatist controversy. In May 313, Maternus and other bishops were summoned to Rome by Emperor Constantine to consult regarding the status of Bishop Caecilianus of Carthage. He also took part in the Synod of Arles in 314. While a legend grew in Trier concerning Maternus, a popular cult developed in Cologne.

The Bollandists and others date his Episcopate to the fourth century. He was the first Apostle of Alsace, and successfully promoted the spread of Christianity in that Province and in Western Germany.

Until the discovery of the Frankfurt silver inscription, dated to between 230 and 270, Maternus' participation in the Synod of Rome in 313 was the earliest reliable evidence for Christianity north of the Alps.

== Legend ==
According to legend, he was a follower of Saint Eucharius, the first bishop of Trier. Eucharius was sent to Gaul by Saint Peter as bishop, together with the deacon Valerius and the subdeacon Maternus, to preach the Gospel. They came to the Rhine and to Ellelum in Alsace, where Maternus died. His two companions hastened back to St. Peter and begged him to restore the dead man to life. St. Peter gave his pastoral staff to Eucharius, and, upon being touched with it, Maternus, who had been in his grave for forty days, returned to life. The Gentiles were then converted in large numbers. After founding many churches the three companions went to Trier where the work of evangelization progressed so rapidly that Eucharius chose that city for his episcopal residence.

Maternus assisted Valerius for fifteen years and then succeeded him as bishop of Trier for the next forty years. While assisting Valerius, he had already founded the dioceses of Cologne and Tongeren. He also founded a church on the site of a Roman temple which later became Cologne Cathedral. The staff of Saint Peter, with which he had been raised to life, was preserved in Cologne till the end of the tenth century when the upper half was presented to Trier, and was afterwards taken to Prague by Emperor Charles IV.

The legend is from the ninth century and appears to have been intended to attest to the ancient establishment of the see of Trier, and therefore seniority over other dioceses in Germany.

Titles of the Great Christian Church
Preceded by Valerius	Bishop of Trier; 300 – 327	Succeeded by Agricius
