= Basilica of Saint Maternus =

Minor basilica in Walcourt, Namur Province, Belgium

- Basilique Saint-Materne
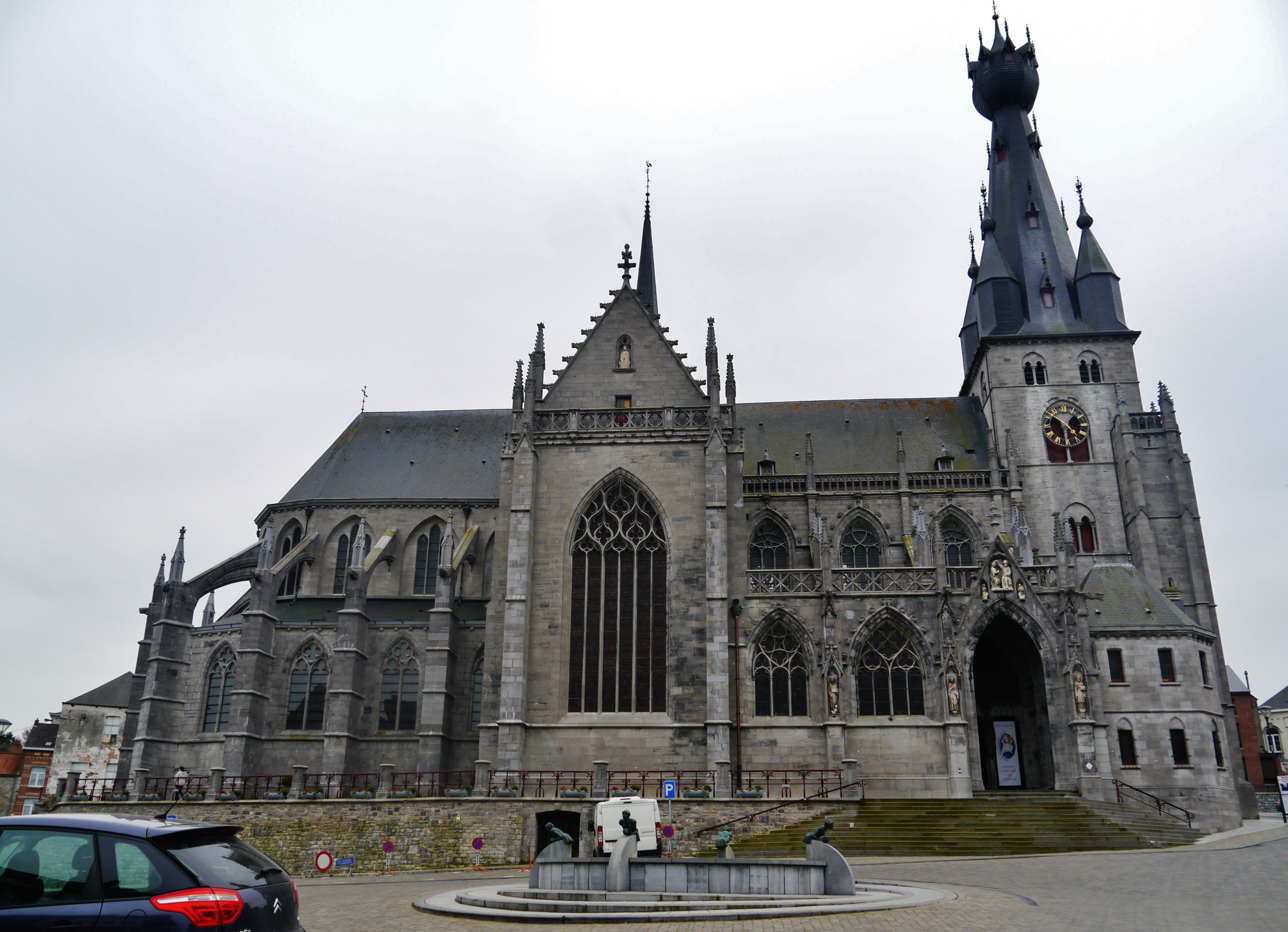
- Basilica of St. Maternus, view from the north
- Basilica of Saint Maternus
- 50°15′06″N 4°25′55″E
- Country: Belgium
- Denomination: Catholic

History
- Dedication: Maternus of Cologne
- Consecrated: 1026

Architecture
- Functional status: Minor basilica
- Heritage designation: Listed building

Administration
- Diocese: Namur

The Basilica of Saint Maternus (French: Basilique Saint-Materne), also known as the Basilica of Our Lady (Basilique Notre-Dame) is a minor basilica in Walcourt, in the Namur Province of Belgium. According to legend, an oratory was founded here by Maternus of Cologne (c. 285–315), who also carved a Madonna to replace an earlier pagan idol. The church does in fact contain a wooden Madonna, albeit from 950 to 1020, but still one of the oldest preserved Marian devotional statues in Western Christianity. The church was consecrated in 1026. The presence of the Madonna and its allegedly miraculous properties led to the development of the church into a pilgrimage site during the Middle Ages. Subsequently, the church was rebuilt into the Gothic edifice seen today between the 13th and 16th centuries. It contains a decorated rood screen from 1521, donated by Emperor Charles V, and decorated choir stalls from the early 16th century. The church has been damaged by fire and war on several occasions, most recently in May 1940 during World War II. Since 1941 it has been a listed building, and since 1950 classified as a minor basilica.

== History ==
=== Legend and Madonna ===
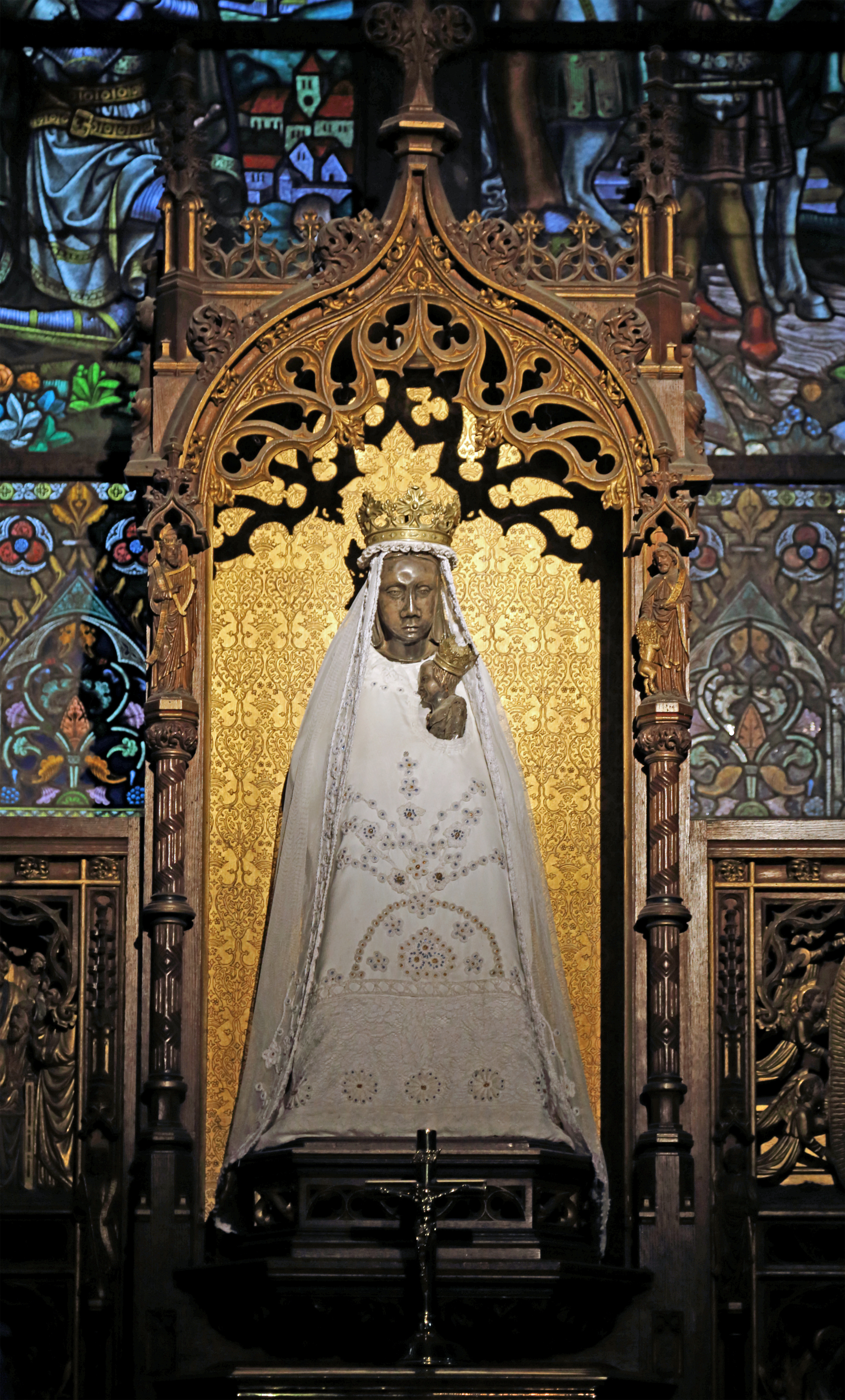
The Madonna of Walcourt

According to a local legend, Maternus of Cologne (c. 285–315) was passing through Walcourt during his efforts to Christianise the area and founded an oratory here. He also is said to have carved a wooden Madonna to replace an earlier pagan idol that had been worshiped by the locals. Supposedly, the oratory was destroyed by Vikings. It is possible that such an oratory existed, but no traces have been found of it. A Romanesque Madonna is preserved in the church, and Walcourt developed into a popular pilgrimage site during the Middle Ages due to the presence and supposed miraculous properties of the Madonna. The Madonna was dated, using radiocarbon analysis, from c. 957–1020, It is made of lime wood, and since the 12th or 13th century it has been covered with silver plating; since the 16th or 17th century it has been dressed in the tradition of Spanish Marian sculptures. Legend recounts how the Madonna was miraculously saved from a fire in 1220, and mysteriously transported by angels and found in the branches of a tree outside the town. A monastery (abbaye du Jardinet; destroyed by French revolutionary troops in 1793 and closed in 1796) was founded on the site where the Madonna was rediscovered. Since then, an annual procession takes place between the basilica and the site of the former monastery.

=== Foundation and development ===
Legend apart, the earliest written source related to the church in Walcourt dates from 1 June 1026, when the church was consecrated by Bishop Réginhard of Liège. The construction of the church was financed by the local lord Oduin and his wife Erembruge. They also provided funds for a community of six canons tied to the church. Because most archival sources have been lost, burnt or destroyed in wars, the detailed history of the church is difficult to retrace. In 1355, a man named Gilles Dameaussins from Namur was in charge of construction works at the church. In 1477 the church was pillaged and badly damaged by soldiers from France and the Duchy of Lorraine. Funds were set aside for repairs several times during the late 15th and early 16th century by the Prince-Bishops of Liège. In 1481, a man named Jehan de Franchimont is described as being in charge of roof repairs. During this period, two of the richest furnishings of the church were also installed, the rood screen (1531) which according to tradition was donated by Emperor Charles V, and the choir stalls (1510–1520). Until 1561, the church belonged to the Diocese of Liège, and since then it has been part of the Diocese of Namur. In 1615, the church was again damaged by fire and subsequently repaired. Following the Battle of Jemappes in 1792, French troops for a short while used the church as a barracks. A large-scale renovation was initiated in the 1850s and lasted almost the entire 19th century. In August 1914, the church was damaged by German artillery during World War I, and again in May 1940, during World War II, it was damaged during the fighting. Since 1941 it has been a listed building, and since 1950 classified as a minor basilica.

== Architecture ==
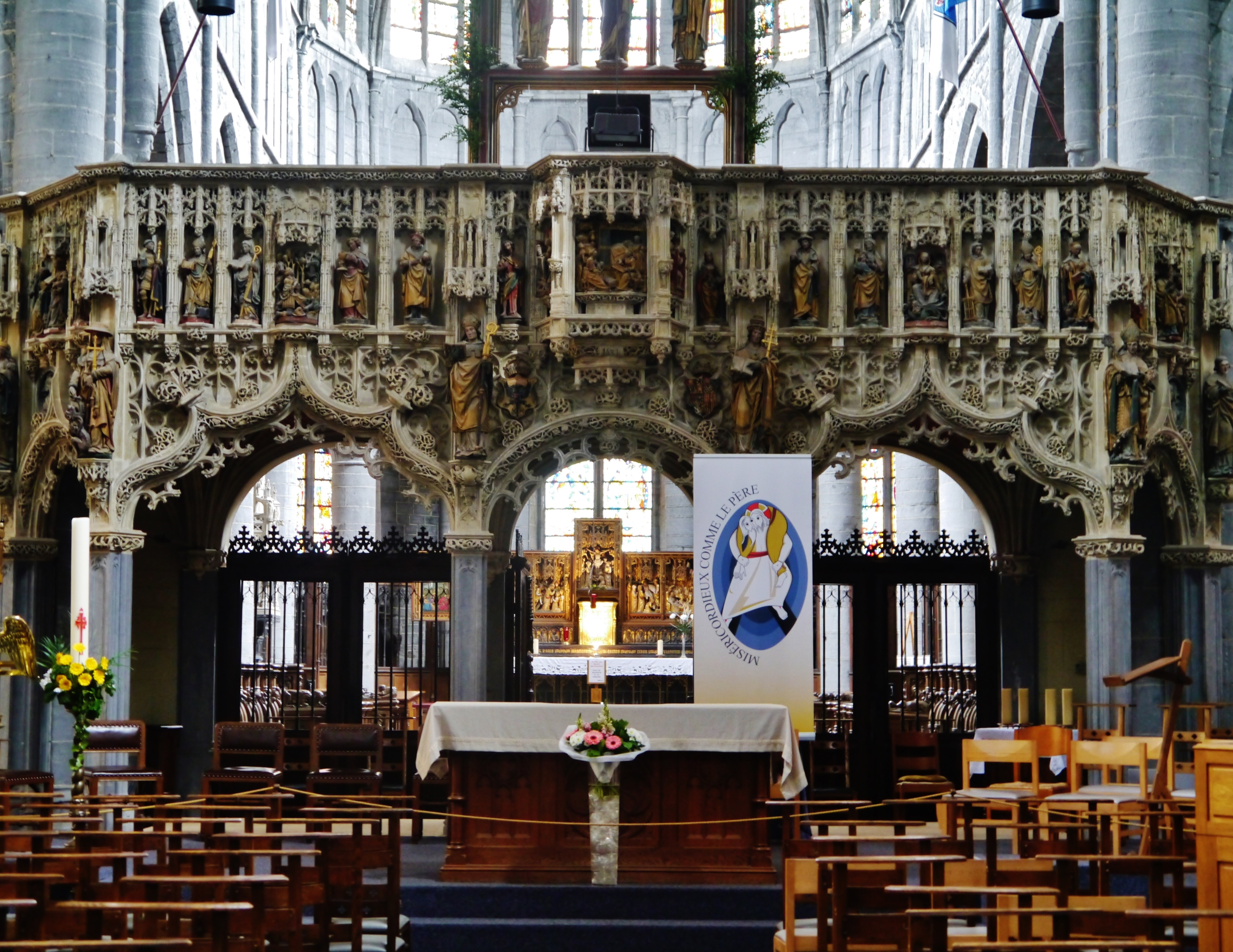
The rood screen, separating the chancel and the nave, from 1531

The basilica is 54 metres (177 ft) long and 27 metres (89 ft) wide at its widest point. It consists of a western tower; a nave, five bays long and flanked by two aisles; a transept; and a chancel three bays long. An ambulatory runs around the chancel, and delimits the pentagonal apse. The oldest part of the church is the base of the tower, dating from the second half of the 12th century. It is the only remains of the first church, probably built in a Romanesque style, an example of Mosan architecture. It was successively replaced by a Gothic church. The chancel of the currently visible building dates from c. 1220–1250, and its architecture displays strong similarities with that of Notre Dame de Dinant (Dinant, Belgium) and the Abbatial church of Notre-Dame de Mouzon (Mouzon, France). From the 14th century, the nave began to be rebuilt, and around 1400 the triforium was built. The currently visible vaults of the chancel are from the third quarter of the 15th century, and those of the transept and nave from 1481 to 1500.

=== Furnishings ===
The rood screen of the church is in a late Gothic style and was installed in 1531. It displays the coat of arms of Emperor Charles V, six statues and more than 20 smaller statues. Above it is a rood cross with depictions of Mary and John the Evangelist. The choir stalls, located in the chancel, are also Gothic. The 40 seats are made of oak and decorated with misericords, including one which depicts the alleged miracle of the Madonna of Walcourt being transported to safety in a tree when the church was ravaged by fire.

== Works cited ==
- Didier, Robert (1993). "Une Vierge ottonienne et son revers du XIIIe siècle". Bulletin de l'Institut royal du patrimoine artistique (in French). 25: 1–43.
- Josis–Roland, Françoise (1970). "La basilique Notre-Dame de Walcourt" [The basilica of Our Lady in Walcourt] (PDF). Bulletin de la Commission Royale des Monuments et des Sites (in French): 62–106. Archived from the original (PDF) on 9 October 2022.
- Menne, Gilbert, ed. (2014). Le grand guide de Wallonie et de Bruxelles (in French). Brussels: Racine. ISBN 978-94-014-1418-0.
- Mercier, Emmanuelle (2019). "New research findings on 11th-early 13th-century polychrome wood sculpture at the Royal Institute for Cultural Heritage, Brussels". Medievalista (26). doi:10.4000/medievalista.2313. ISSN 1646-740X.
