= Johann von Gott Fröhlich =

Johann von Gott Fröhlich (1 March 1780, in Bissingen – 31 January 1849, in Munich) was a German classical philologist and educator.

He studied theology in Dillingen (from 1797) and law at Landshut (1802–04), and afterwards taught classes at gymnasiums in Kempten (from 1804), Amberg (from 1811) and Munich (from 1817). From 1823 up until his death, he served as rector at Wilhelmsgymnasium in Munich.

== Published works ==
- Tragōdiai: Philoktetes, Elektra, die Trachinerinnen, 1815 – Tragedies: Philoctetes, Electra, The Trachiniae.
- Kritische Versuche über Sophokles Tragödien - Issues 1-2, 1823 – Critical essays on Sophocles' tragedies.
- Einige Stellen in Horatius Oden und Satiren kritisch behandelt, 1837 – On Horace's odes and satires (critiques).
- Anzeige der neuesten Ausgabe des Velleius von Kritz, 1843 – On the latest version of Velleius by Justus Friedrich Kritz.
- Q. Valerii Catulli Veron. liber... : Vorschläge zur Berichtigung des Textes (with Karl Lachmann, 1849) – On Catullus; suggestions for amendment of text.
- Ueber die in Demosthenes' Rede Über die Krone enthaltene Grabschrift auf die bei Chäronea gefallenen Athenäer, 1852 – On Demosthenes' speech in regards to Athenians killed at the Battle of Chaeronea.
- Denkrede auf Johann von Gott Fröhlich, 1849 by Leonhard von Spengel (a commemoration).
