= Joseph Kopp =

German classical philologist

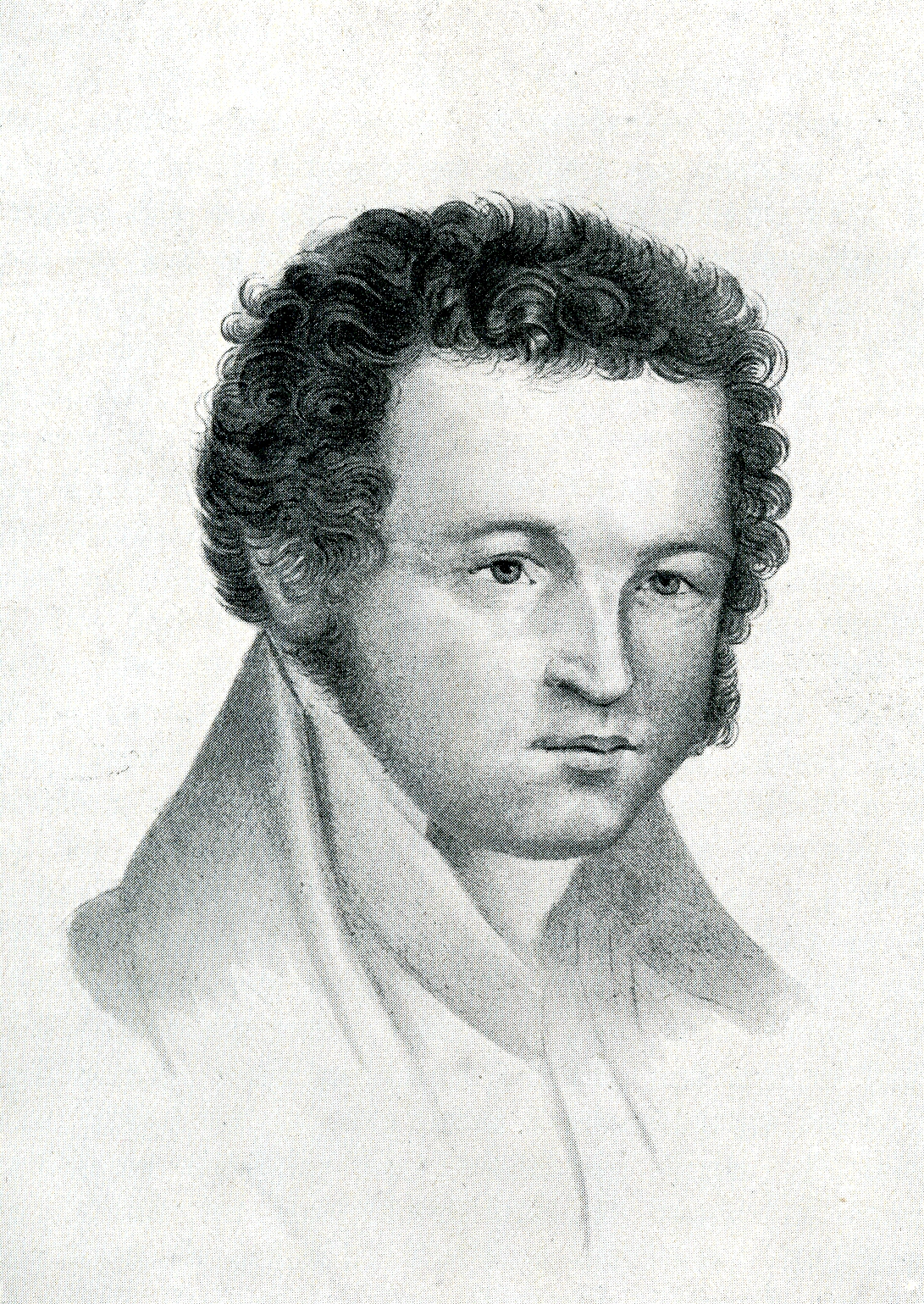
Joseph Kopp (lithograph)

Joseph Kopp (16 November 1788, in Sommerau – 7 July 1842, in Erlangen) was a German classical philologist.

He attended the lyceum in Munich as a pupil of Christian Friedrich Wilhelm Jacobs, and from 1810 to 1812 studied philology at the University of Heidelberg, where his teachers included August Böckh and Georg Friedrich Creuzer. Afterwards, he worked as schoolteacher in Munich, and in 1819 was named a professor of history and second director of the philological seminar at the lyceum. In 1827 he was appointed professor of philology at the University of Erlangen, where he became a good friend and colleague of orientalist Friedrich Rückert.

== Published works ==
He was not a prolific author of books, his best known literary effort being an edition of Damascius, titled Damascii philosophi Platonici Quaestiones de primis principiis (1826). In 1831–34 he published a number of reviews on the editions of Aristotelian books, on works of Oriental literature, on the history of philosophy, etc. He was also the author of an unfinished Aristotelian lexicon. In 1888 novelist Fritz Reuter published Friedrich Rückert in Erlangen und Joseph Kopp. Nach Familienpapieren dargestellt zum hundertjährigen Geburtstag des Dichters ("Friedrich Rückert in Erlangen and Joseph Kopp. According to family papers presented to the centennial birthday of the poet").
