= Aloys Lütolf =

Swiss historian (1824–1879)

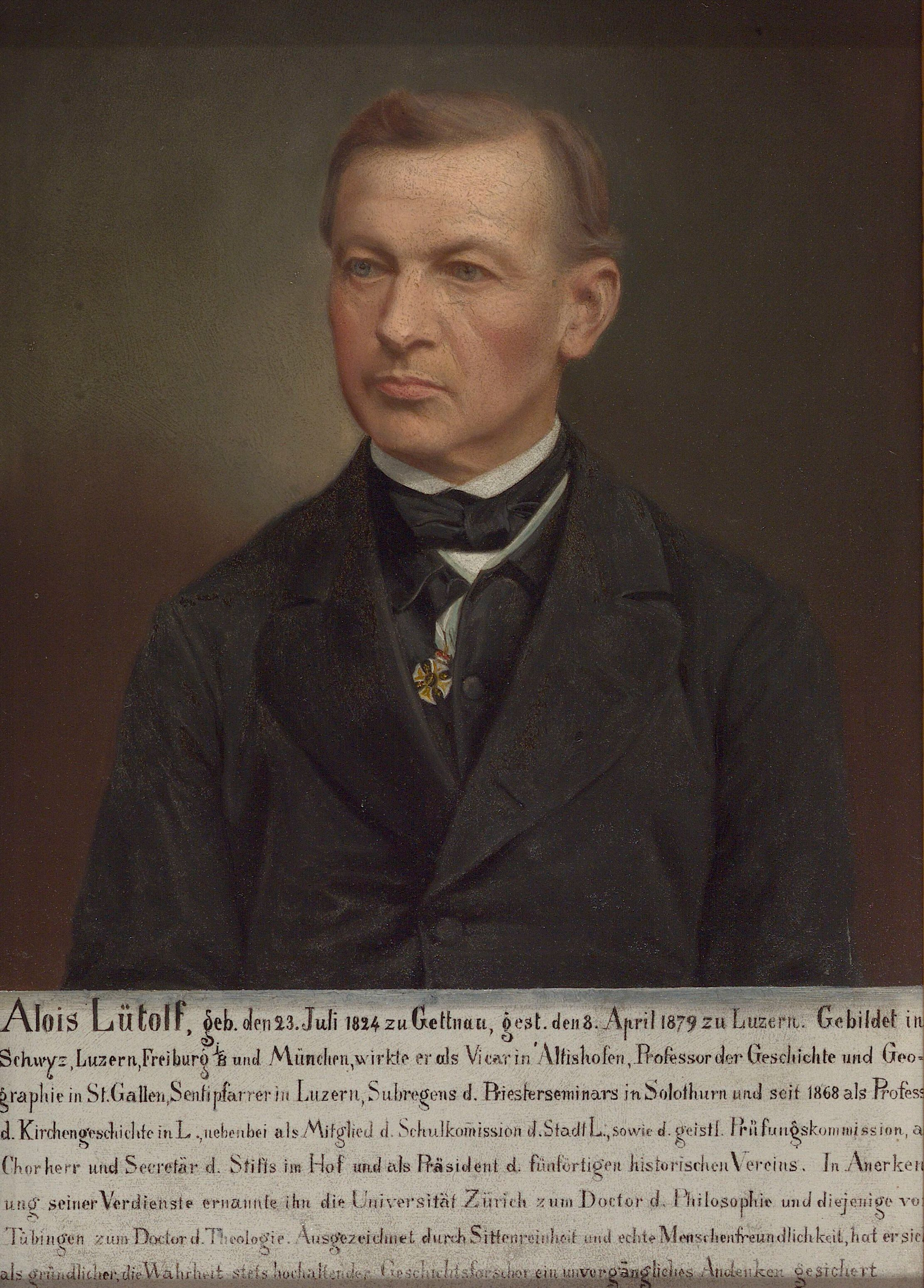
Portrait of Alois Lütolf

Aloys Lütolf (23 July 1824 – 8 April 1879) was a Swiss Catholic priest and ecclesiastical historian.

== Life ==
Aloys Lütolf was born on 23 July 1824 in Gettnau near Willisau, Switzerland. He made his early studies at the Jesuit College of Schwyz, and at the Lyceum at Lucerne, where he became an enthusiastic student of history. But as the political situation at that time did not permit of serious study, Lütolf, with a number of students of like youthful ardour, placed themselves in 1847 at the disposal of their country. For a time Lütolf was employed as private secretary at Lucerne, and also took part in the expedition of the Sonderbund army into the Canton of Ticino.

From 1847 to 1849, he studied theology and history at Freiburg in Baden and at Munich, and in 1850 was ordained priest at Solothurn. After serving on the mission for a time, he taught history from 1852 to 1856 at the Catholic cantonal school of St. Gallen. On the suppression of this school, Lütolf became parish priest at Lucerne. In 1864, he was appointed viceregent of the clerical seminary at Solothurn, in 1858 professor of church history, and shortly afterwards canon of St. Leodegar's chapter at Lucerne. Aloys Lütolf died on 8 April 1879 in Lucerne.

== Works ==
In 1859 he began to publish his investigations made at St. Gallen. The most important are Sagen, Gebräuche und Legenden aus den fünf Orten (Lucerne, 1865) and Glaubensboten der Schweiz vor St. Gallus (Lucerne, 1870), a contribution to the ancient history of Switzerland. His Leben und Bekenntnisse des I. L. S. Schiffmann (Lucerne, 1861) is a memorial to his former master, Father Schiffman; the book also contains important information about Bishop Sailer, and his school in Switzerland.

He also has a work on the historian Kopp, Jos. Ant. Kopp als Professor, Dichter, Staatsmann und Historiker (Lucerne, 1868). The latter had shortly before his death given him his historical manuscripts, and commissioned him to complete his partly finished work, Geschichte der eidgenössischen Bünde.
