= Ehl, Bas-Rhin =

Coordinates: 48.374°N 7.617°E

Ehl (French pronunciation: [ɛl]) is a locality in the commune of Sand, Bas-Rhin, close to the town of Benfeld in Grand Est, France. It is the site of the important Gallo-Roman city of Ellelum.
