= Gesta Treverorum =

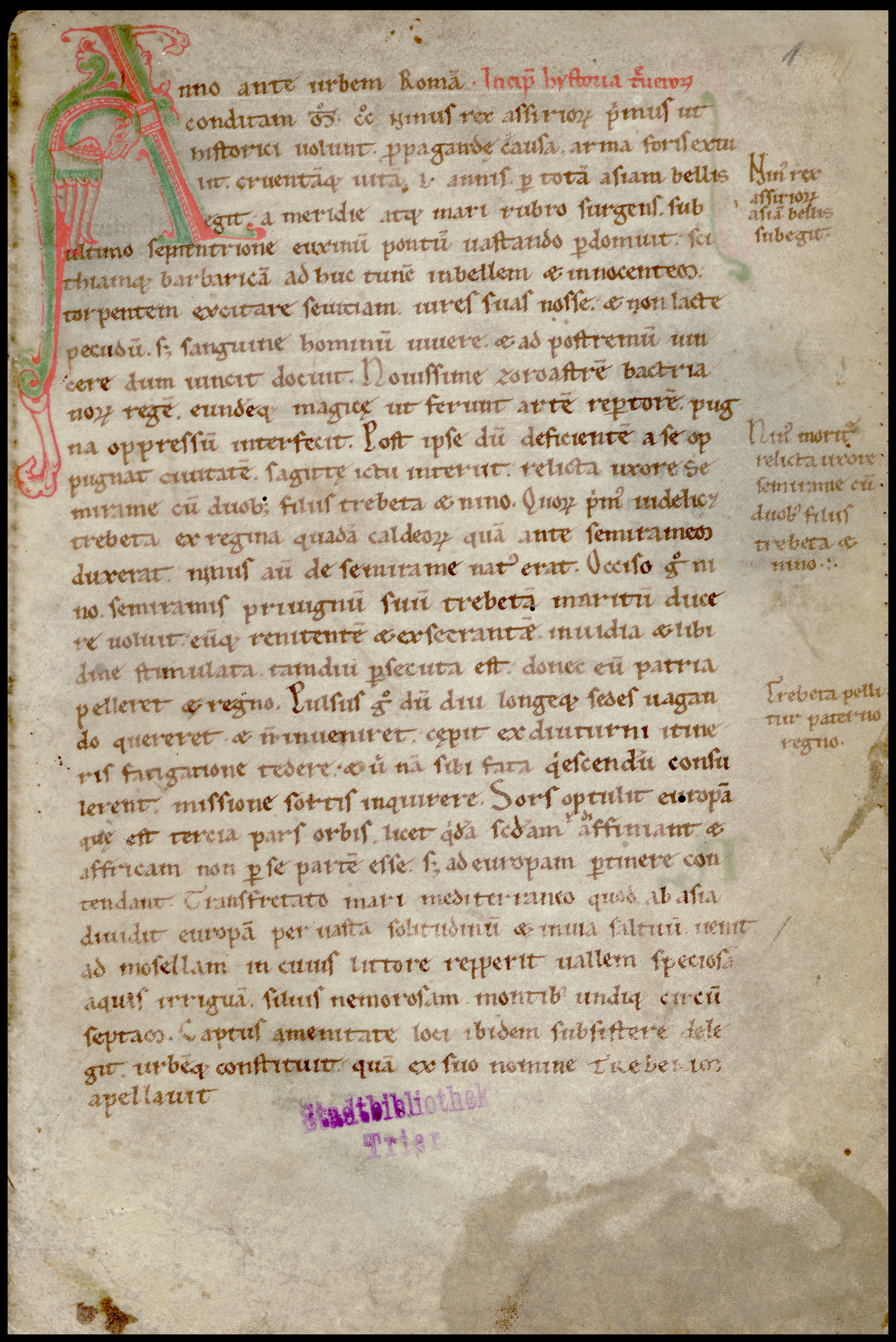
Manuscript of the Gesta Treverorum in the Scientific Library of the City of Trier, 12th–14th century

The Gesta Treverorum (Deeds of the Trevians) is a collection of histories, legends, wars, records of the Archbishops of Trier (Trèves), writings of the Popes, and other records that were collected by the monks of the St. Matthias' Abbey in Trier. It was begun in the 12th century and was continued until 1794 when the Archbishopric of Trier came to an end. An edition was published as an eight-volume set in the 19th century. A new 8-volume edition by Emil Zenz was published in the 1950s and 1960s.

== Edition ==
- Zenz, Emil (ed. and tr.) (1955–1962). Die Taten der Trierer. Gesta Treverorum. 8 vols. Trier. Edition with German translation.
- Waitz, Georg (ed.) (1848). "Gesta Treverorum." MGH Scriptores 8. pp. 111–200.
- Waitz, Georg (ed.) (1879). "Gesta Treverorum continuata." MGH Scriptores 24. pp. 368–488.
