= Mervat Seif el-Din =

Egyptian classical archaeologist (born 1954)

- ميرفت سيف الدين
- Born: 1954 (age 71–72); Alexandria, Egypt
- Citizenship: Egypt
- Occupations: Classical archaeologist; museum director

Academic background
- Education: Alexandria University; University of Trier
- Thesis: (1985)
- Doctoral advisor: Günter Grimm

Academic work
- Discipline: Archaeology
- Sub-discipline: Classical archaeology
- Institutions: Graeco-Roman Museum

Mervat Seif el-Din (Arabic: ميرفت سيف الدين; born 1954) is an Egyptian classical archaeologist who was Director of the Graeco-Roman Museum of Alexandria from 2004 to 2010. A specialist in the archaeology of Alexandria, el-Din is an expert on faience and funerary painting in particular.

== Biography ==
El-Din was born in Alexandria in 1954. She studied at the University of Alexandria from 1970 to 1974 in the Department of Archaeology for her undergraduate and Master's degrees. In 1976 she became assistant curator at the Graeco-Roman Museum of Alexandria, where she worked until she emigrated to Germany to undertake postgraduate research. Between 1979 and 1985 she completed her doctorate at the University of Trier. She was supervised by the archaeologist Günter Grimm (de). In 1999 she served as the Secretary General of the Archaeological Society of Alexandria. She taught at Ain Shams University and at Helwan University in Egypt before returning to the Greco-Roman Museum of Alexandria as Chief Curator, which she then headed from 2004 to 2010. Since 2010, she has been responsible for the publication of recent excavations in the Bubasteion of Alexandria (fr). A specialist in Greco-Roman Egypt, she carried out studies covering both large sculpture and funerary painting, as well as moulded relief ceramics, earthenware, crockery and metal figurines. In 2014 a festschrift was published in honour of her 60th birthday, which examined the archaeology of Alexandria through different material cultures.

== Selected publications ==
- Die reliefierten hellinistisch-römischen Pilgerflaschen, French Institute of Oriental Archeology in Cairo (IFAO), 2006.
- With Marie-Dominique Nenna, "The small earthenware plastic of the Greco-Roman museum of Alexandria" in Bulletin de correspondence hellénique, vol. 118, p. 291-320.
- With Marie-Dominique Nenna, Earthenware tableware from the Greco-Roman period, French Institute of Oriental Archeology in Cairo (IFAO), 2000.
- With Ahmed Abdel-Fattah, Mostafa El-Abbadi, Alexandria, Graeco-Roman Museum: A Thematic Guide, American University in Cairo.
- With Ahmed Abdel-Fattah, Mostafa El-Abbadi, al-Iskandarīyah: al-Matʹḥaf al-Yūnānī al-Rūmānī, Cairo, 2003.

== Gallery ==
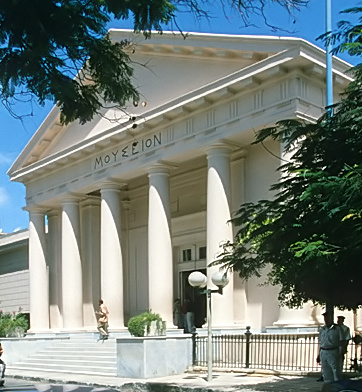
Graeco-Roman Museum

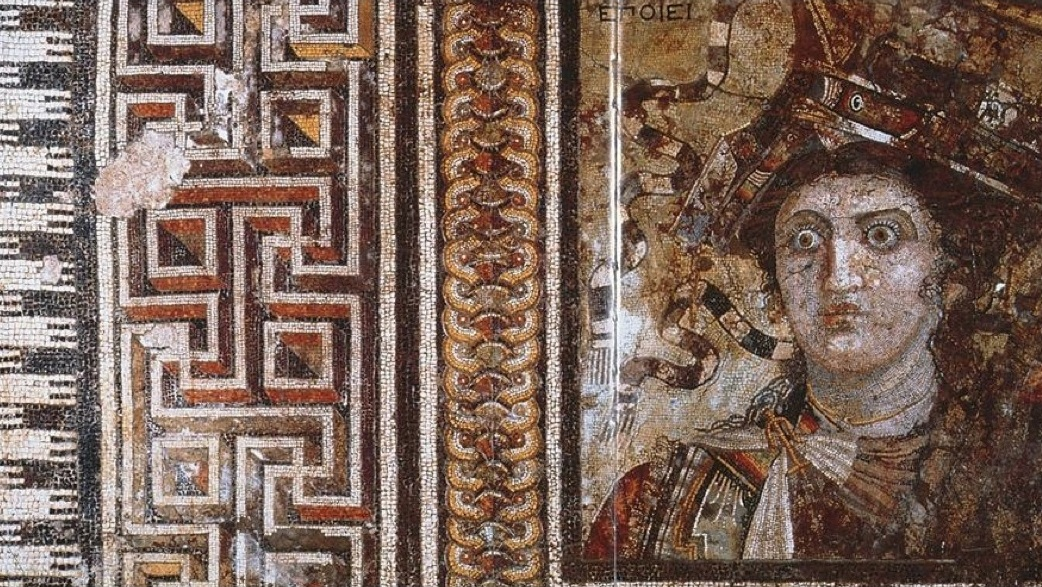
Sophilos Mosaic

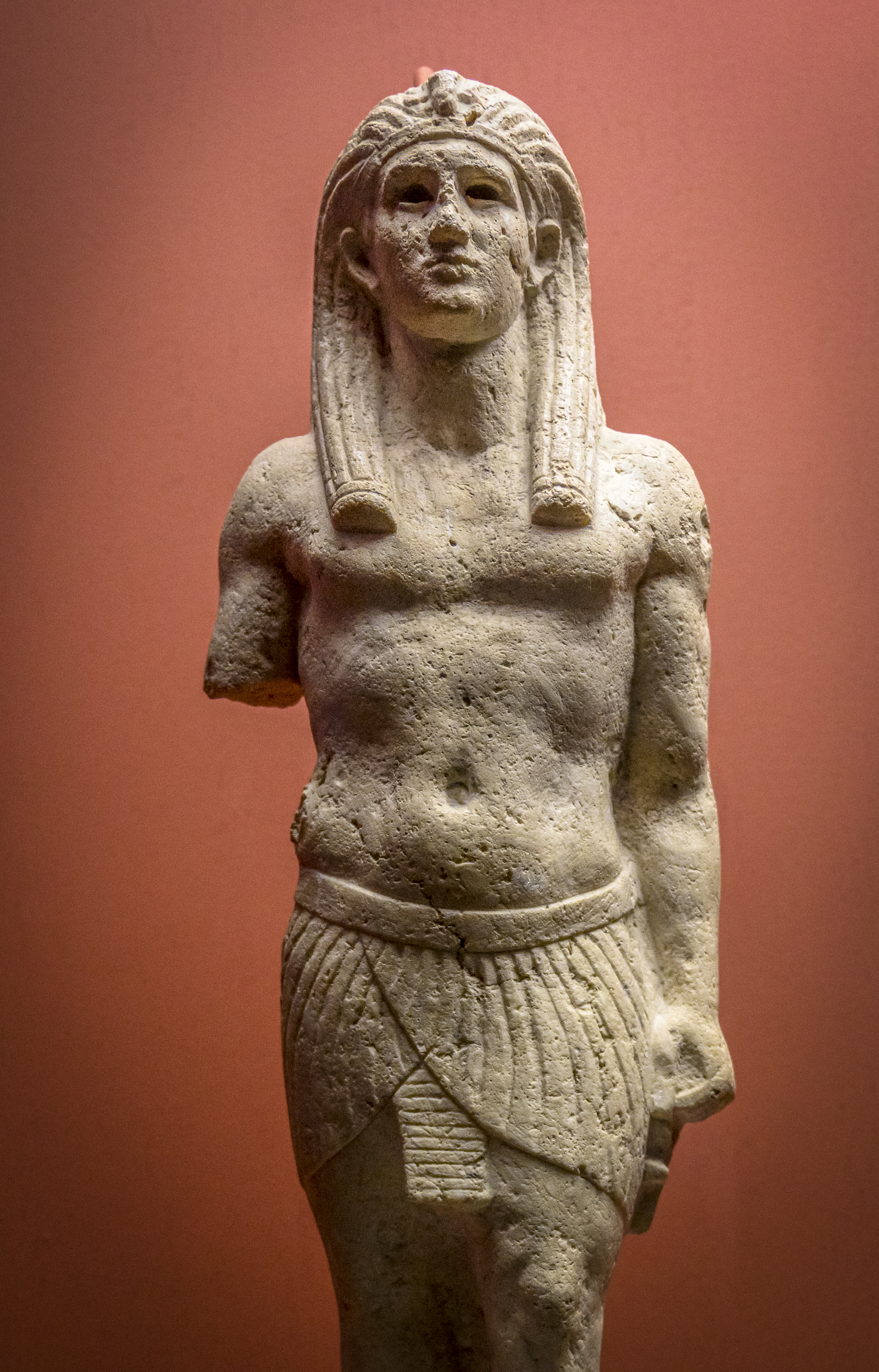
Osiris-Antinous in marble 2nd century CE

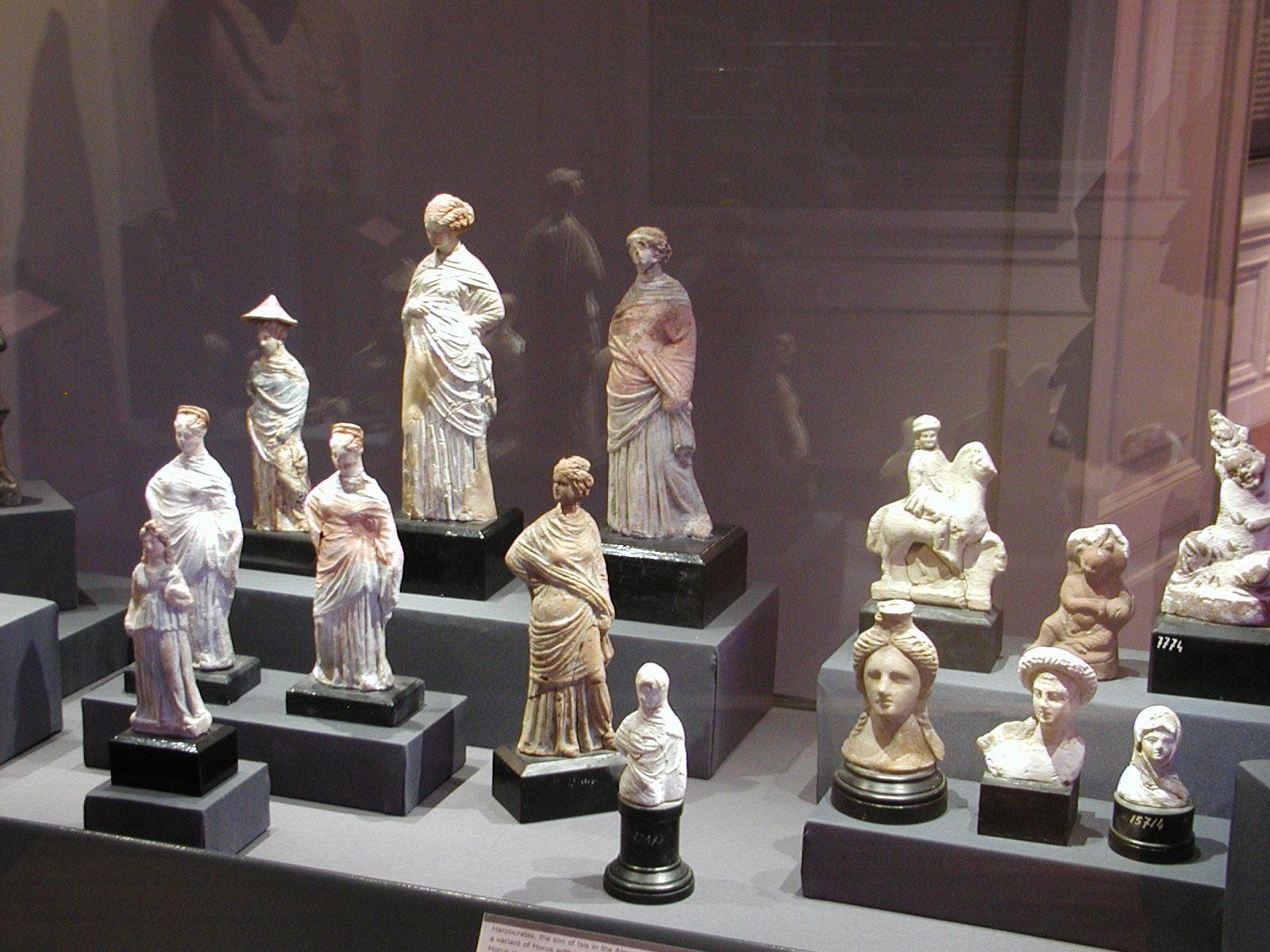
Figurines

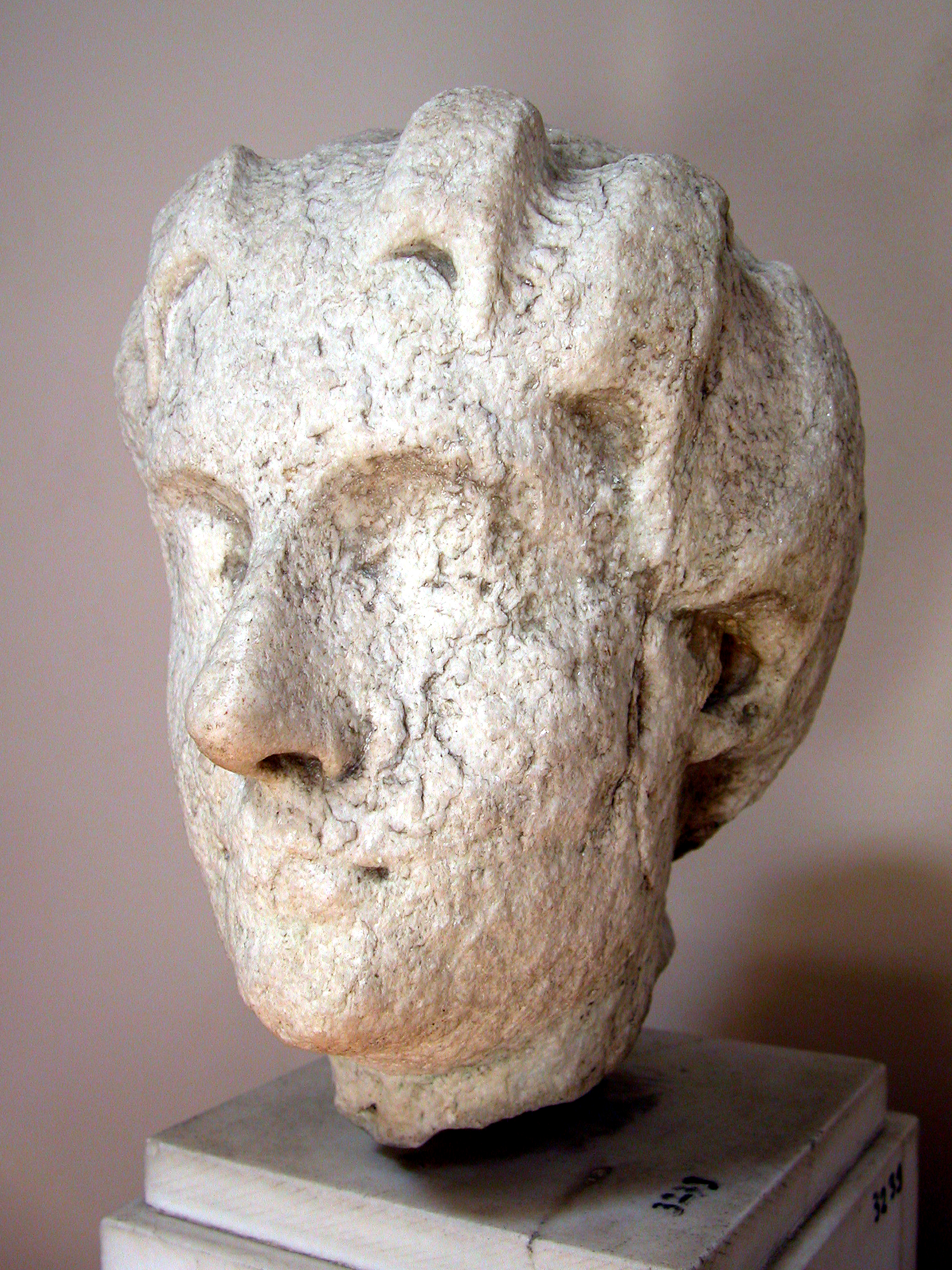
Cleopatra

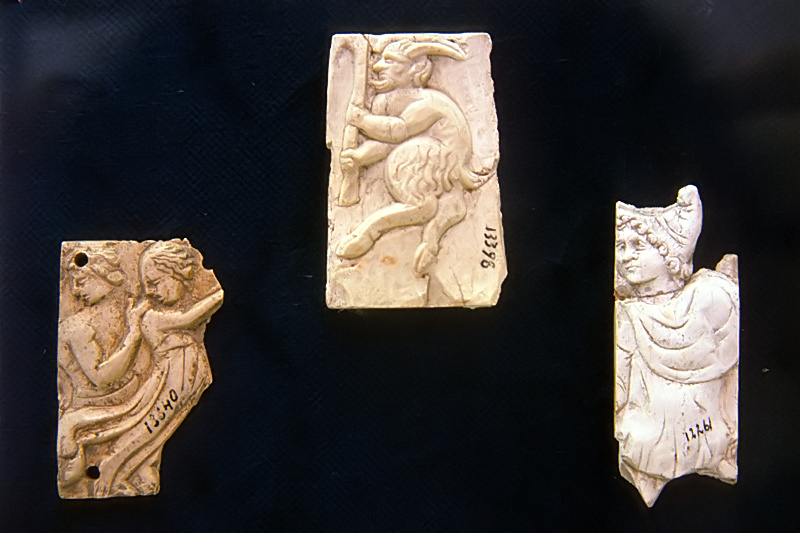
