= Werner Schüßler =

Werner Schüßler (born 22 July 1955 in Altrich) is a professor of philosophy at the Faculty of Theology in Trier. After graduating from high school in Wittlich in 1975, Werner Schüßler studied philosophy, Catholic theology and pedagogy in Trier, Tübingen and Quebec, Canada. In 1999 he was appointed as a full professor of philosophy at the Faculty of Theology in Trier. He gave his inaugural lecture on 8 November 1999 on Viktor E. Frankl's contribution to philosophical anthropology. In the academic year 2005/06 and in the academic year 2017/18 he was dean of the Faculty of Theology. In 2023, he retired. At his official farewell ceremony on 9 November 2023, he gave a lecture entitled Philosophie – zwischen Wissenschaft und Weisheit.
