= Okayama University =

National university in Okayama Prefecture, Japan

Coordinates: 34°41′20″N 133°55′12″E

- 岡山大学
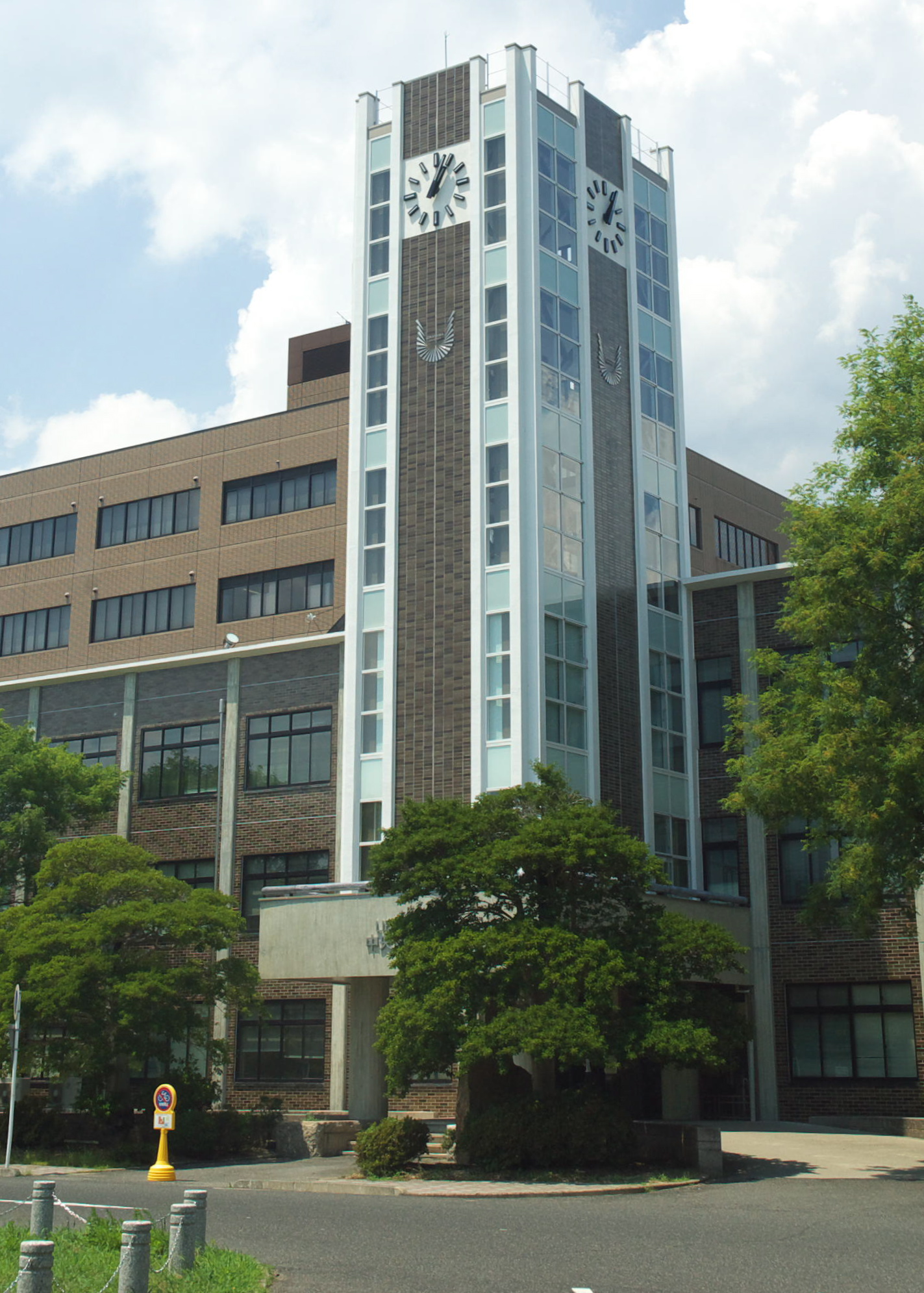
- Okayama University Library (Tsushima Campus)
- Motto: "Creating and fostering higher knowledge and wisdom"
- Type: Public (National)
- Established: Founded 1870; Chartered 1922
- President: Yasutomo Nasu
- Academic staff: 1,312 full-time （May 2021）
- Administrative staff: 1,270（May 2021）
- Students: 13,024（May 2021）
- Undergraduates: 10,084（May 2021）
- Postgraduates: 2,970（May 2021）
- Doctoral students: 1,237（May 2021）
- Location: Okayama, Okayama, Japan
- Campus: Urban
- Colors: Blue and red ocher
- Website: www.okayama-u.ac.jp

Okayama University (岡山大学, Okayama Daigaku) is a national university in Japan. The main campus is located in Tsushima-Naka, Okayama, Okayama Prefecture.

The school was founded in 1870 and it was established as a university in 1949. In 2014, the university was selected as one of the 37 Top Global Universities by the Japanese Ministry of Education, Culture, Sports, Science and Technology (MEXT).

== History ==
Okayama University was originally founded as the Medical Training Place (医学館, Igakkan) in 1870 by Okayama-Han. After the abolition of the han system, it became the Okayama Prefectural Medical School (岡山県医学校) in 1880. In 1888 it was merged into a national school, the Third Higher Middle School (第三高等中学校, Daisan kōtō chūgakkō) to constitute the Medical Faculty. The Medical Faculty became an independent school in 1901 and was renamed Okayama Medical Speciality School (岡山医学専門学校, Okayama igaku semmon gakkō), a four-year medical school for men ages 17–21 or above. In 1922, the school was chartered as Okayama Medical College (岡山医科大学, Okayama ika daigaku), a four-year medical college for men ages 19–23 or above.

In 1949, after World War II, the college was merged with other national and public colleges in Okayama Prefecture to establish Okayama University, under Japan's new education system. The predecessors of the university were:

1. Okayama Medical College, the Sixth Higher School (第六高等学校, Dairoku kōtō gakkō; established in 1900)
2. Okayama Normal School (岡山師範学校, Okayama shihan gakkō; founded in 1874)
3. Okayama Youth's Normal School (岡山青年師範学校, Okayama seinen shihan gakkō; founded in 1922)
4. Okayama (Prefectural) Agricultural College (岡山農業専門学校, Okayama nōgyō semmon gakkō; established in 1946)

The new campus (Tsushima Campus) was the former camp of the Imperial Japanese Army (the 17th Division). After occupation army left the camp in 1947, the students of the Sixth Higher School (whose buildings were burnt in the war) guarded the camp, residing in the former military barracks. Later, the camp became their campus. The faculties of Okayama University, except the Medical School, were gradually relocated to Tsushima Campus.

The university at first had five faculties: Law and Letters, Education, Science, Agriculture and Medicine. The latter history of the university is as follows:

- 1951: Ohara Institute for Agricultural Research (大原農業研究所, Ōhara nōgyō kenkyūsho; founded in 1914 by Magosaburō Ōhara) joined the university.
  - Later reorganized into the Institute for Agricultural and Biological Sciences (in 1953) and then the Research Institute for Bioresources (in 1988).
- 1960: the Faculty of Engineering was established.
- 1967: Professor Jun Kobayashi (analytic chemistry, Faculty of Agriculture) announced the cause of Itai-itai disease as cadmium poisoning. Itai-itai disease (meaning "ouch ouch" disease in Japanese), was a severe pain disease affecting Toyama Prefecture as a result of mining over the course of 1,500 years.
- 1976: the Faculty of Pharmaceutical Sciences was established.
- 1979: the Dental School was established (in Shikata Campus).
- 1980: the Faculty of Law and Letters was divided into three faculties: Letters, Law and Economics.
- 1994: the Faculty of Environmental Science and Technology was established.

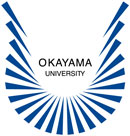
Okayama University badge

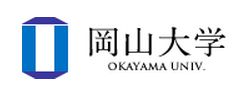
Okayama University Communication Symbol

== Academics ==
- Faculty of Letters
- Faculty of Education
- Faculty of Law
- Faculty of Economics
- Faculty of Science
- Medical School
- Dental School
- Faculty of Pharmaceutical Sciences
- Faculty of Engineering
- Faculty of Environmental Science and Technology
- Faculty of Agriculture
- Matching Program Course
- Discovery Program for Global Learners (English-medium program)

== Graduate schools ==
- Graduate School of Education (Master's courses/Professional Degree Course)
- Graduate School of Humanities and Social Sciences (Master's/Doctoral)
- Graduate School of Natural Science and Technology (Master's/Doctoral)
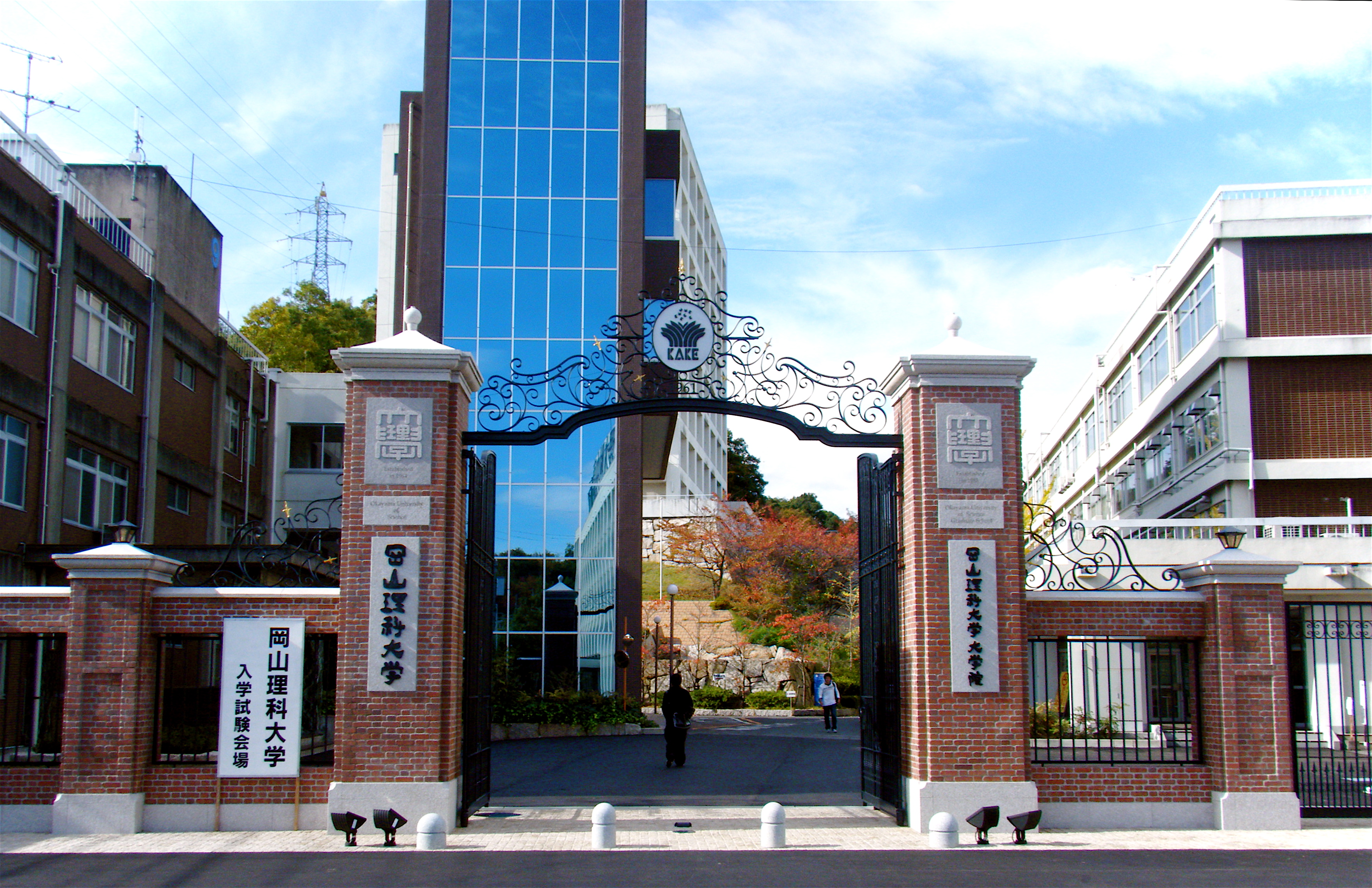
- Entrance Gate of the Okayama University of Science
  Graduate School of Health Sciences (Master's/Doctoral)
- Graduate School of Environmental and Life Science (Master's/Doctoral)
- Graduate School of Medicine, Dentistry and Pharmaceutical Sciences (Master's/Doctoral)
- School of Law

== Attached Institute ==
- Research Institute for Bioresources

== Nationwide Joint-use Facility ==
- Institute for Study of the Earth's Interior

== Academic rankings ==
University rankings
Global
| THE | General | 801–1000 |
| QS | General | 951-1000 |
| ARWU | Research | 501–600 |

Regional
| QS Asia (Asia version) | General | =230 |

National

Okayama University was ranked as the top university in the Chugoku and Shikoku area in the 2020–2021 University Brand Image Survey conducted by Nikkei BP.

In 2023, Okayama University ranked 21st in Japan and 351-400th in Asia according to Times Higher Education.

The QS World University Rankings placed Okayama University in the 901-950th bracket overall, 613rd in Sustainability, and 134th in East Asia in 2024. In the Academic Ranking of World Universities, Okayama University ranked 501-600th worldwide in 2023.

== Notable alumni ==
- Sahachiro Hata - nomination for the Nobel Prize in Physiology or Medicine in 1913.
- Seiki Yoshioka - professional wrestler for Pro Wrestling Noah. Achieved a pharmaceutical qualification.
- Mutsuko Ayano - murdered while working on a PhD in Germany at University of Trier
