= Tarforst =

Coordinates: 49°44′58″N 6°41′17″E

Tarforst is a suburban part of the city Trier in Germany with about 7,000 inhabitants. The University of Trier is situated in the suburb. The Romans settled in Tarforst 2,000 years ago. The village became a part of Trier in 1969.
