= Brand rankings of Japanese universities =

The Brand rankings of Japanese universities (大学ブランドランキング Daigaku Burando Rankingu) is a ranking of the Japanese universities by Nikkei Business Publications, released annually in November.

It is a ranking system which evaluates the universities' power of brand. According to Nikkei BP, BRJU stands on the idea of "How people think", but not the quality or functions of university. Therefore, questionnaires are done to third-person groups.

== Methodology ==
It is composed by 49 indicators related to the power of brand. Each indicator was calculated by the result of questionnaires to business(wo)men, people who have children and people related to education in a same region of targeted universities. these indicators are related to not only reputation or popularity, but also various recognitions such as a review of HR. Basically the same methodology of corporate brand research is applied to this ranking systems.

It ranks universities in 5 areas, with Greater Tokyo Area, Hokuriku/Tokai Area, Kansai Area, Chugoku/Shikoku Area and Kyushu/Okinawa Prefecture/Yamaguchi Area. Each university is ranked in its own region's rankings, thus there are no national rankings.

== Top 10/20 Universities in the BRJU ==
Rankings have been conducted on an annual basis since 2009, and apart from the 2009, rankings are all regional, so there is not an overall ranking for universities, rather a ranking within their geographical area.

=== Greater Tokyo Area ===
| Overall Rank 2016 | Overall Rank 2015 | Overall Rank 2014 | Overall Rank 2013 | Overall Rank 2012 | Overall Rank 2011 | Overall Rank 2010 | Overall Rank 2009 | University | Type | Overall Score |
| 1 | 1 | 2 | 1 | 1 | 1 | 2 | 2 | University of Tokyo | NA | 87.5 |
| 2 | 2 | 1 | 3 | 3 | 2 | 3 | 1 | Keio University | PR | 82.0 |
| 3 | 3 | 3 | 2 | 2 | 3 | 1 | 3 | Waseda University | PR | 81.9 |
| 4 | 4 | 4 | 4 | 4 | 5 | 4 | 4 | Sophia University | PR | 70.4 |
| 5 | 6 | 6 | 5 | 5 | 4 | 5 | 5 | Hitotsubashi University | NA | 69.2 |
| 6 | 8 | 7 | 9 | 10 | 7 | 9 | 7 | Aoyama Gakuin University | PR | 68.6 |
| 7 | 5 | 5 | 8 | 6 | 9 | 6 | 6 | Tokyo Institute of Technology | NA | 68.4 |
| 8 | 9 | 9 | 10 | 9 | 10 | - | 9 | Tokyo University of Foreign Studies | NA | 68.3 |
| 9 | 10 | 9 | 6 | 7 | 6 | - | 8 | Ochanomizu University | NA | 66.6 |
| 10 | 6 | 11 | - | 8 | 8 | 8 | 12 | Meiji University | PR | 65.8 |
| 11 | 13 | 14 | - | - | - | - | 14 | Rikkyo University | PR | 64.4 |
| 12 | 11 | 12 | - | - | - | 10 | 16 | International Christian University | PR | 62.5 |
| 13 | 12 | 8 | - | - | - | - | 10 | Gakushuin University | PR | 62.5 |
| 14 | 15 | 17 | - | - | - | - | 17 | Yokohama National University | NA | 61.5 |
| 15 | 17 | 15 | - | - | - | - | 12 | Tokyo University of Science | PR | 61.4 |
| 16 | 14 | 16 | - | - | - | - | 10 | Chuo University | PR | 61.1 |
| 17 | 18 | 19 | - | - | - | - | 20 | Hosei University | PR | 60.2 |
| 18 | 19 | 18 | - | - | - | - | 21 | Nihon University | PR | 59.5 |
| 19 | 16 | 13 | - | - | - | - | 15 | Tsuda College | PR | 59.2 |
| 20 | - | - | - | - | - | - | 18 | Tokyo University of the Arts | PR | 56.1 |

=== Kansai Area ===
| Overall Rank 2014 | Overall Rank 2013 | Overall Rank 2012 | Overall Rank 2011 | Overall Rank 2010 | Overall Rank 2009 | University | Type | Overall Score |
| 1 | 1 | 1 | 1 | 1 | - | Kyoto University | NA | 91.8 |
| 2 | 2 | 2 | 2 | 2 | - | Osaka University | NA | 74.0 |
| 3 | 3 | 3 | 3 | 3 | - | Doshisha University | PR | 68.5 |
| 4 | 4 | 4 | 6 | 6 | - | Kobe University | NA | 66.4 |
| 5 | 7 | 6 | 7 | 4 | - | Kansai University | PR | 65.7 |
| 6 | 5 | 5 | 5 | 5 | - | Ritsumeikan University | PR | 65.5 |
| 7 | 8 | 8 | 8 | 8 | - | Kinki University | PR | 64.8 |
| 8 | 6 | 7 | 4 | 7 | - | Kwansei Gakuin University | PR | 62.4 |
| 9 | 9 | 9 | 9 | 9 | - | Osaka City University | PU | 58.3 |
| 10 | 10 | 10 | 10 | 10 | - | Osaka Prefecture University | PU | 55.1 |

=== Chugoku-Shikoku Region ===
| Overall Rank 2014 | Overall Rank 2013 | Overall Rank 2012 | Overall Rank 2011 | Overall Score 2010 | Overall Rank 2010 | University | Type | Overall Score |
| 1 | 1 | 1 | 1 | 1 | - | Hiroshima University | NA | 89.3 |
| 2 | 2 | 2 | 2 | 2 | - | Okayama University | NA | 83.6 |
| 3 | 3 | 3 | 3 | 3 | - | Ehime University | NA | 64.7 |
| 4 | 10 | 8 | 9 | 6 | - | Hiroshima Institute of Technology | NA | 60.0 |
| 5 | 9 | 10 | - | 9 | - | Okayama University of Science | PR | 59.8 |
| 6 | 4 | 4 | 6 | 4 | - | Tokushima University | NA | 59.5 |
| 7 | 5 | 6 | - | 8 | - | Kagawa University | NA | 59.3 |
| 8 | 8 | 5 | - | 5 | - | Yamaguchi University | NA | 58.0 |
| 9 | 6 | 7 | 5 | 7 | - | Notre Dame Seishin University | PR | 57.5 |
| 10 | 11 | - | 8 | 10 | - | Kōchi University | NA | 53.3 |

=== Kyushu and southern Japan ===
In 2010 Kyushu University was ranked top in this area.
