= Mutsuko Ayano =

Japanese student murdered in Germany (1956–1983)

- 綾野 睦子
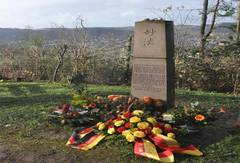
- Memorial stele for Mutsuko Ayano, Petrisberg Hill, Trier, Germany (LAT: 49° 45′ N, LONG: 6° 40′ E)
- Born: September 30, 1956; Okayama Prefecture, Japan
- Died: November 21, 1983 (aged 27); Petrisberg Trier, West Germany
- Known for: Murdered while a university student

Mutsuko Ayano (綾野 睦子), (September 30, 1956 – November 21, 1983) was a Japanese doctoral student who was murdered while studying in West Germany. Her murder led to her parents starting a scholarship fund, a Japanese studies program being created in Germany, and various faculty and student exchange programs between Germany and Japan.

== Studies and death ==
Ayano completed her studies in German philology in Japan at Okayama University and came to the University of Trier in 1981 as a Rotary scholarship recipient to pursue her doctorate under Professor Hermann Gelhaus. She was considered a diligent and gifted student. In letters to her parents, she wrote about life in West Germany, the differences between it and Japan, and her love of the German language. A selection of these letters was published in German translation in 1987 and reissued a few years later in a small booklet. A new edition of these letters was published by Iudicium Verlag in 2020.

On the morning of November 17, 1983, she was walking from Trier-East along Kreuzweg to the university when she encountered Janusz Komar, a 20-year-old Czech fairground worker who was in Trier for All Saints' Day Mass. (Note: Some sources report that Komar was Polish.) He tried to snatch Ayano's handbag. When she resisted, she fell and was kicked several times in the head by the man. He fled with 90 Deutschmarks. Mutsuko Ayano succumbed to her severe injuries a few days later in the hospital. Initially, the police had no leads on the perpetrator. The case was solved when the perpetrator was apprehended in Regensburg in December 1983, where he had robbed and kicked another woman to death. He was sentenced to life imprisonment and refuses to leave prison.

=== Aftermath ===
The crime sparked widespread public sympathy. In 1984, a memorial stele designed by the Trier sculptor Jupp Zimmer according to the wishes of Mutsuko Ayano's parents was erected at the site of the attack on Petrisberg Hill. It was donated by the Rotarians who had funded her scholarship and made of sandstone at the request of her parents. In 2008, a street in Petrisberg-West was named after Mutsuko Ayano (49° 45′ N, 6° 40′ E). Since the memorial was erected in 1984, local residents volunteer to always take care of the memorial and provide fresh flowers and candles for it.

In response to their daughter's murder, her parents established the Mutsuko Ayano Fund, which has enabled Japanese students to study at Trier University since 1985 and is administered by the Friends of Trier University. Beginning in 1993, Osaka Gakuin University has sent one or two students a year to study at Trier University. Since February 2016 there has been an exchange of both faculty and students between Trier University and Okayama University. Two of these scholarship recipients are now professors of German Studies in Japan: Kazuhiko Tamura (1985/1986) at Kwansei Gakuin University and Akiko Hayashi (1986/1987) at Tokyo Gakugei University. In her welcoming address at the 11th German Japanology Conference in Trier in 1999, Professor Hilaria Gössmann pointed out that Mutsuko Ayano's death had been crucial in establishing Japanese Studies as a discipline at the University of Trier.

== Quotes from Mutsuko Ayano's letters ==
“Here I am truly all alone. Whether I stumble or grimace – it is completely irrelevant to others. In this society, I am a person who is not needed in the slightest. It is pathetic and makes me very sad.” (May 11, 1981)

"My interest in the world of the German language knows no bounds, even after studying it for so long." (April 5, 1982)

"There's something touching about the stories of people who do creative work. They see not only time and space, the here and now, but also the suffering involved in the birth of a work, the joy, the struggle with oneself. And then there's the life of calmly contemplating oneself: I only came to know and experience all of this here. I think I've become a little different; moved away from a superficial, fickle self full of curiosity." (January 17, 1983)

“That is my motto: 'If you want to master a language, you have to like the language.' I thought that this sentence was mine, but I discovered that the venerable Goethe said something similar: 'What you don't love, you can't do.'” (February 7, 1983)

“Be that as it may, I am truly very impressed by the strength of the women here, their sense of responsibility for their own work, their assertiveness. [...] I don't want to become so harsh. Even if we talk about equality, there is something that only women have. It's not bad if a woman uses that [...] it's wonderful to live in a world where you can determine your own life, the way you want to.” “You only live once. I want to live in a way that I can justify to myself. Here I have learned and experienced a way of life, a way of life that transcends time and space; a way of life that consists of calmly observing oneself and constantly wrestling with oneself to find something essential.” (February 22, 1983)
