= Archaeological Society of Alexandria =

Egyptian organisation

The Archaeological Society of Alexandria (formerly the Royal Archaeological Society of Alexandria) was established in 7 April 1893 in Alexandria, Egypt to ensure the archaeological monuments and remains of the old city of Alexandria were preserved and to raise awareness through high-quality research of the city's archaeological past.

== Founding ==
Its first president was Ambrose Rally and the first general secretary was Georgios Gousios. Among its members were prominent Greeks like, Sir John Antoniades, Emmanouil Benakis, Michael Salvagos, Eustathios Glymenopoulos, Mikes Synadinos.

== Work ==
In 1938 the Society supervised the second edition of E. M. Forster’s Alexandria: A History and a Guide.

The Archaeological Society of Alexandria with funds from the A. G. Leventis foundation and permission and supervision of the Egyptian Ministry of Tourism and Antiquities initiated the Alexandria Necropolis Project (2020–2023) that restored the Hellenistic necropolis at Shatby.

== Publications ==
- Bulletin de la Société Royale d'Archéologie d'Alexandrie

== See also ==
- Graeco-Roman Museum
- Institut Français d'Archéologie Orientale
- Egyptian Institute
- Egypt Exploration Society
