= Institute for Environmental and Technology Law =

Part of University of Trier, Germany

- Other name: Institut für Umwelt- und Technikrecht
- Established: 1989
- Focus: Environmental and technology law
- Location: University of Trier, Trier, Germany
- Dissolved: 2019

The Institute for Environmental and Technology Law (German: Institut für Umwelt- und Technikrecht (IUTR)), established in 1989, was a central academic institution of the University of Trier. The institute was specialized in research and teaching in the fields of environmental law and technology law. In 2019 it was reorganized and changed into the Institut für Recht und Digitalisierung (IRDT, "Institute for Digital Law Trier").
