= Evaristo Breccia =

Italian egyptologist

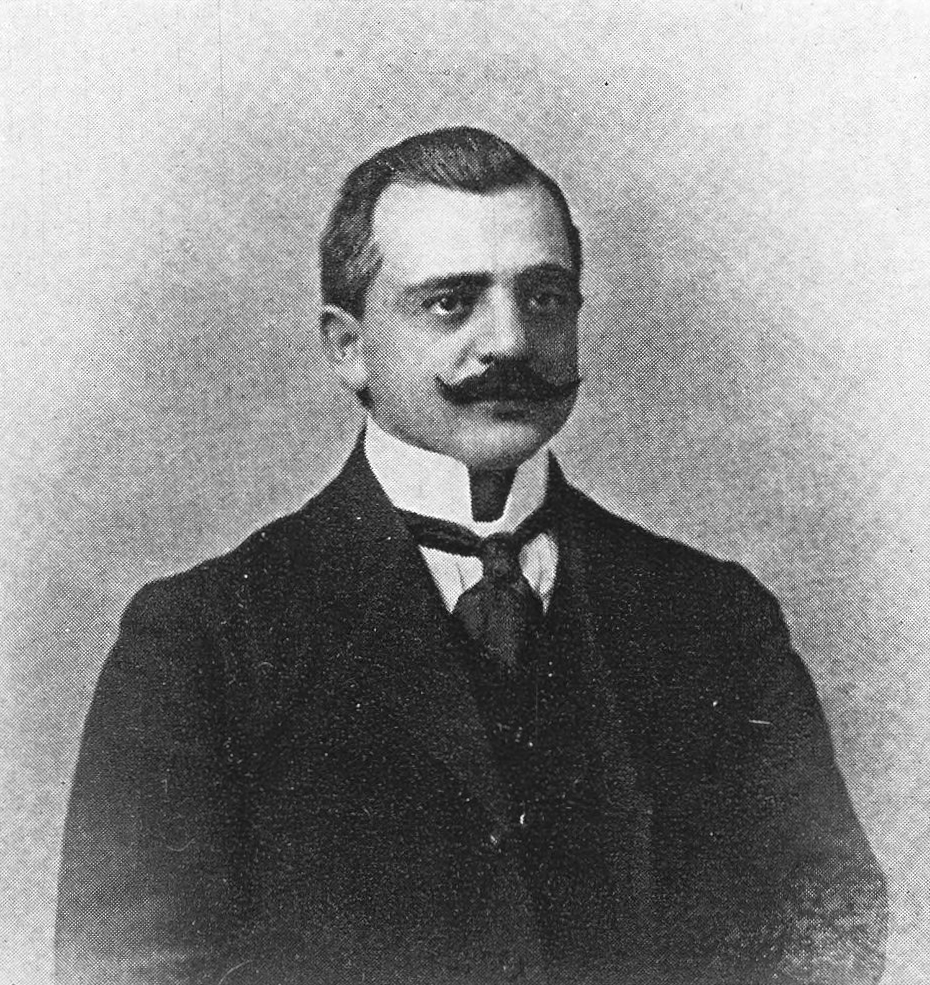
Breccia 1909

Annibale Evaristo Breccia (18 July 1876, Offagna - 28 July 1967, Rome) was an Italian egyptologist, the second director of the Greco-Roman Museum of Alexandria and rector of the University of Pisa.

== Early life and studies ==
He was born in Offagna to Cesare Breccia and Angela Gatti. He graduated in 1900 from the University of Rome with a degree on ancient history.

== Career ==
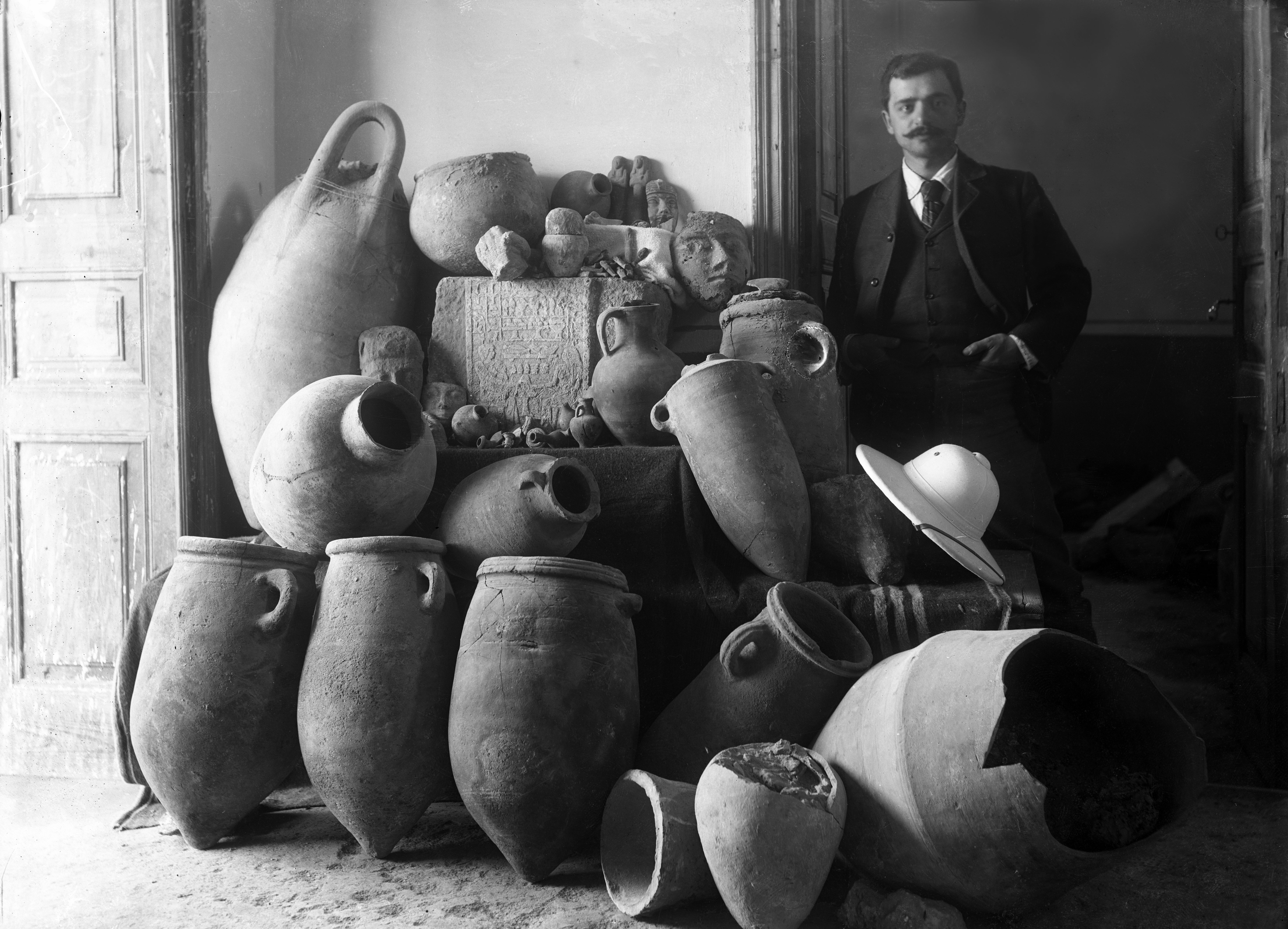
Evaristo Breccia with some finds at the conclusion of the excavations at Giza in Egypt, which he opened in 1903. Museo Egizio Photographic archive, Turin.

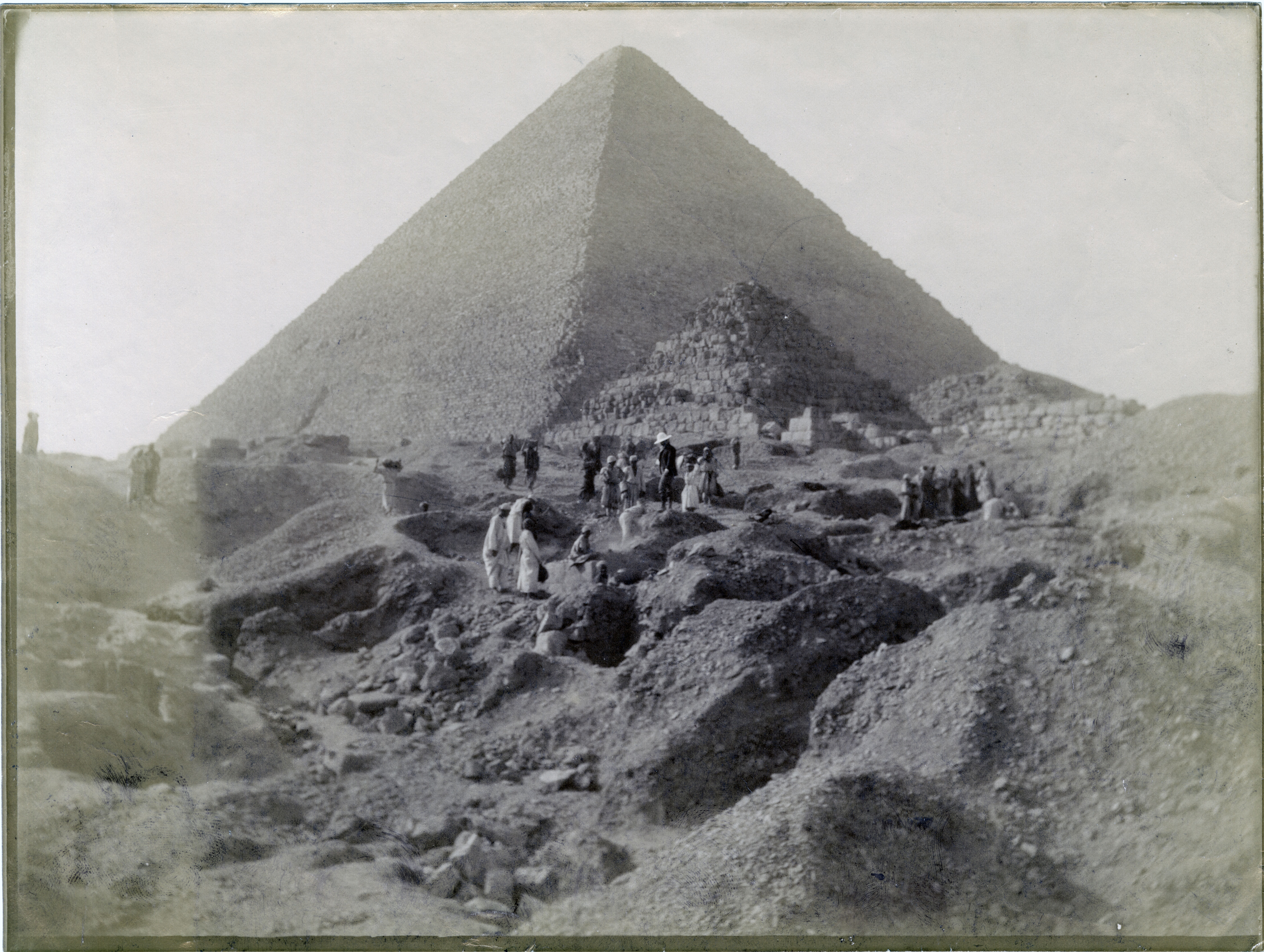
Evaristo Breccia (center) directing excavation work on the mastaba tomb G 7391 of the dignitary Iteti, 1903; in the background is the Pyramid of Cheops, along with two of the satellite pyramids. In this shot, the excavation has not yet uncovered the mastaba's façade.

Breccia founded in 1893, together with other scholars, the Archaeological Society of Alexandria. From 1 April 1904 to 29 October 1932 he was the director of the Greco-Roman Museum of Alexandria where he succeeded Giuseppe Botti. He was a member of the Accademia dei Lincei.

In 1903 he excavated in Hermopolis Magna under Ernesto Schiaparelli. Additionally, he conducted excavations in a number of sites including Alexandria, Giza, Hermopolis, Fayum, Middle Egypt, Oxyrhynchus, El Hiba, Antinoe and Cyrene. He excavated until 1937 when a serious illness forced him to give up his excavations, that were continued by Sergio Donadoni. In 1933 he was appointed professor of Greek and Roman history at the University of Pisa and between 29 October 1939 and 28 October 1941 he was the rector of the University.

He is well known for his guides of Alexandria and the Greco-Roman Museum.

== Personal life ==
In 28 July 1967 Breccia died by suicide in Rome. After his death his wife, Paolina Salluzzi, donated his archive to the University of Pisa. The archive includes his correspondence, his manuscripts such as notes, publication projects, excavation reports and photographs, drawings of monuments and finds, and photographic plates.

== Publications ==
- Breccia, E. (1907). Les fouilles dans le Sérapéum d'Alexandrie en 1905-1906. Annales du Service des antiquités de l'Égypte, Tome VIII. Le Caire: Imprimerie de l'Institut Français d'Archéologie Orientale, 62-76.
- Breccia, E. (1907). Guide de la Ville et du Musée d'Alexandrie, Alexandrie.
- Breccia, E. (1911). La Tomba Dipinta di Such el-Wardian. In: Le Musée Egyptien. Le Caire: Imprimerie de l'Institut Français d'Archéologie Orientale, 63-74.
- Breccia, E. (1911). Catalogue Général des Antiquités égyptiennes du Musée d'Alexandrie: Iscrizioni Greche e Latine per Evaristo Breccia. Le Caire: Imprimerie de l'Institut Français d'Archéologie Orientale.
- Breccia, E. (1912). La Necropoli di Sciatbi. Le Caire: Imprimerie de l'Institut Français d'Archéologie Orientale.
- Breccia, E. (1914) Municipalité d'Alexandrie. Alexandrea ad Aegyptum: Guide de la Ville Ancienne et Moderne et du Musée Gréco-Romain. Bergamo: Instituto Italiano d'Arti Grafiche.
- Breccia, E. (1922). Alexandrea ad Ægyptum: a Guide to the Ancient and Modern Town, and to its Graeco-Roman Museum. Bergamo: Instituto Italiano d'Arti Grafiche.
- Breccia, E. (1923). Vestigia Neolitiche nel Nord del Delta. Alexandrie: Société des Publications Égyptiennes.
- Breccia, E. (1923). La mosaïque de Chatby. Bulletin de la Société Archéologique d'Alexandrie, 19, 158-165.
- Breccia, E. (1926). Monuments de l'Egypte Gréco-Romaine. Tome 2. Le rovine e i monumenti di Canopo. Teadelfia e il tempio di Pneferos. Bergamo: Officine dell'Instituto Italiano d'Arti Grafiche.
- Breccia, E. (1930). Monuments de l'Égypte Gréco-Romaine. Tome 2, Fasc. 1: Terrecotte figurate greche e greco-egizie del Museo di Alessandria. Bergamo: Officine dell'Instituto Italiano d'Arti Grafiche.
- Breccia, E. (1932). Dans le desert de Nitrie, Bulletin de la Société Archéologique d'Alexandrie, viI, 17-26.
- Breccia, E. and Donadoni, S. (1938). Le prime ricerche italiane ad Antinoe (Scavi dell 'Istituto Papirologico Fiorentino negli anni 1936-1937). Aegyptus, 18(3/4), 285–318.
