= Sergio Donadoni =

Italian Egyptologist (1914–2015)

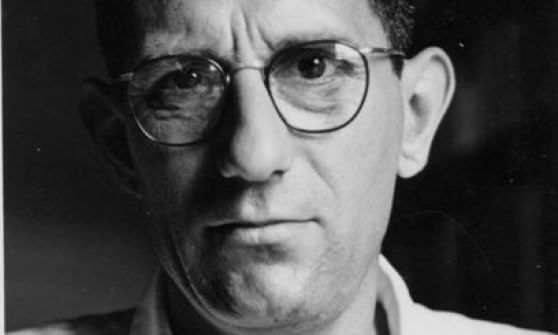
- Born: Sergio Donadoni; 13 October 1914; Palermo
- Died: 31 October 2015 (aged 101); Rome
- Occupation: Egyptologist
- Spouse: Anna Maria Roveri

Fabrizio Sergio Donadoni OMRI (13 October 1914 – 31 October 2015) was an Italian archaeologist who worked in the disciple of Egyptology.

== Life ==
Born in 1914 in Palermo, he was fascinated by the ancient Egypt since childhood, with a particular interest on the Greco-Roman period. In 1931 he enrolled the Scuola Normale Superiore di Pisa and later he moved to France and studied under Gustave Lefebvre, Alexandre Moret and Étienne Drioton. Donadoni then moved to Egypt, and since 1935 he participated to an excavation campaign at Antinoopolis led by his teacher, the archaeologist Evaristo Breccia. In 1938 he was a student of Hermann Junker at Cairo. During the war, from 1938 to 1940, he joined the excavation of the Middle Kingdom temple of Medinet Madi led by Achille Vogliano. At the end of the 1940s he returned to Italy and started teaching at the University of Pisa, and later at the Sapienza University of Rome.
In the late 1950s Donadoni was invited to join the team of archaeologists that operated the relocation of the Abu Simbel temples in Nubia due to the construction of the Aswan High Dam and the subsequent formation of Lake Nasser. Among his students at this time, notable were Edda Bresciani, and Anna Maria Roveri who later became his wife. His later, several excavations and studies are mostly concentrated in Nubia; among the others, since 1973 he excavated at Jebel Barkal. He also excavated the 26th Dynasty tomb TT27 at Thebes which belonged to Shoshenq, chief steward of the Divine Adoratrice Ankhnesneferibre.
A remarkable work by Sergio Donadoni is The Egyptians, first published in English in 1997. Later in his life, Donadoni became professor emeritus at the Sapienza University; he also was a member of the Accademia dei Lincei. In 2000 he was awarded with the Grand Cross of the Order of Merit of the Italian Republic. He died on 31 October 2015 in Rome.

== See also ==
- List of Egyptologists
