= University of Trier =

Public university in Germany

Trier University
- Universität Trier
- Latin: S. Almi Studii Treverensis
- Motto: Treveris ex urbe deus complet dona sophiae
- Motto in English: In Trier God completes the gifts of wisdom
- Type: Public
- Established: 1970, historical: 1473–1798
- Budget: € 114.8 million (2023)
- Rector: Eva Eckkrammer
- Academic staff: 175 professors 780 (2025/2026)
- Administrative staff: 603 (2025/2026)
- Total staff: 2,006 (2025/2026)
- Students: 10,164 (2025/2026)
- Location: Trier, Rhineland-Palatinate, Germany; 49°44′51″N 6°41′16″E
- Website: www.uni-trier.de
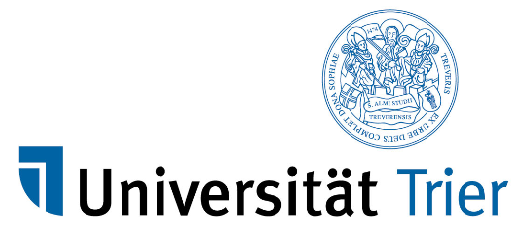

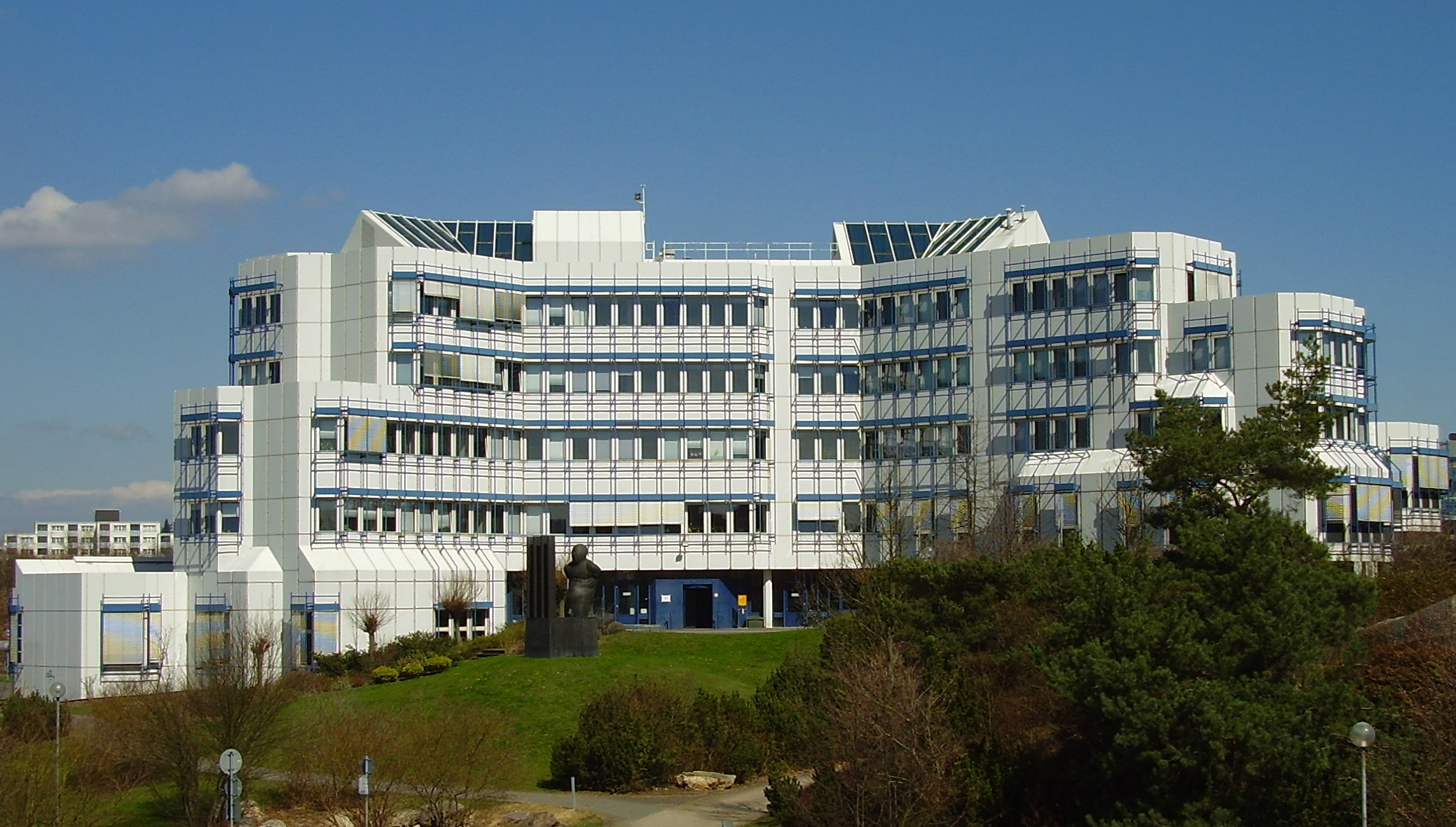
Faculty building

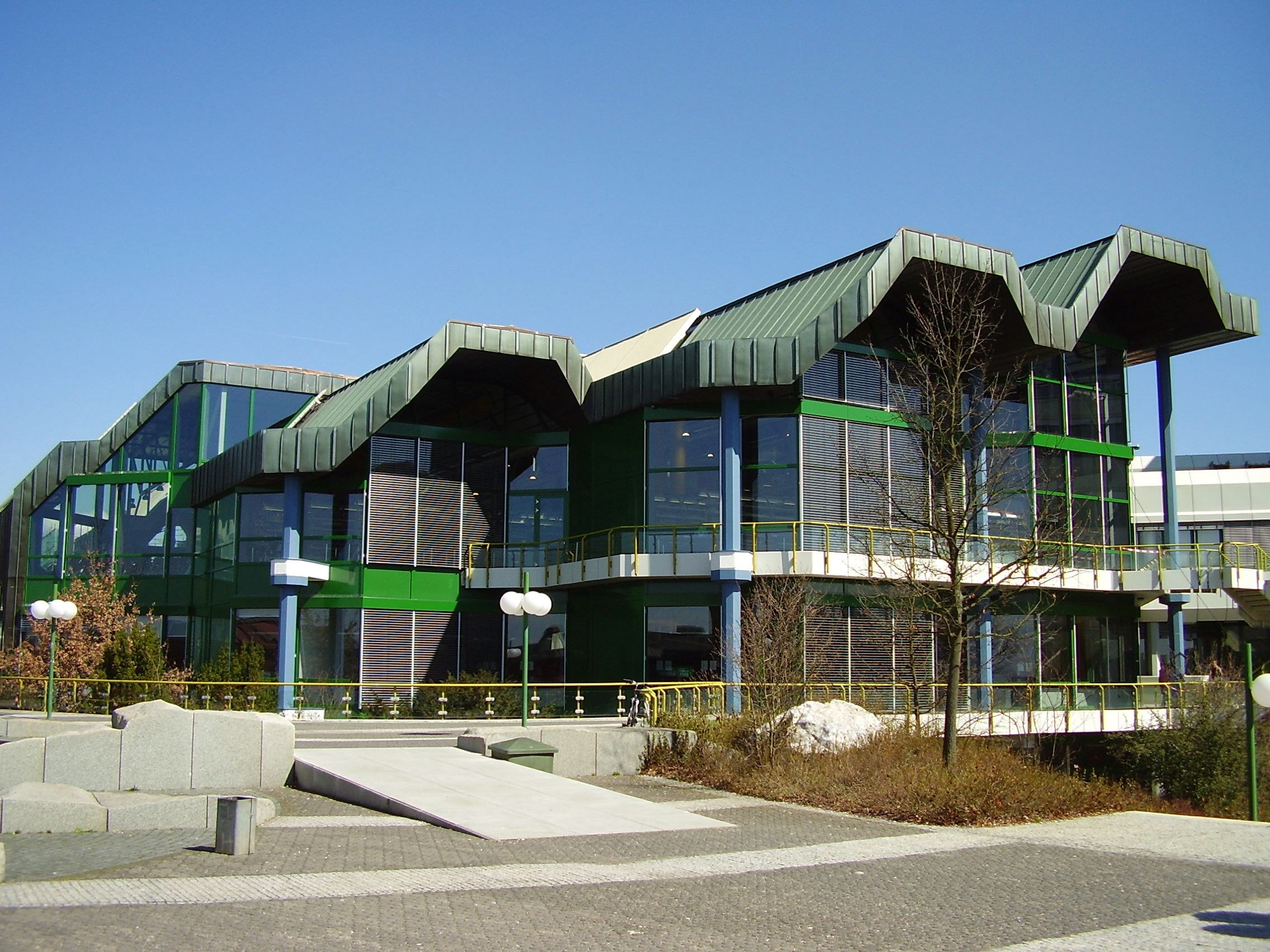
Library

The Trier University (German: Universität Trier), in the German city of Trier, was founded in 1473. Closed in 1798 by order of the then French administration in Trier, the university was re-established in 1970 after a hiatus of some 172 years. The new university campus is located on top of the Tarforst heights, an urban district on the outskirts of the city. The university has six faculties with around 470 faculty members. In WS 2025/2026 around 10,000 students were matriculated, with 61.66% female; the percentage of foreign students was 17.2%.

== History ==
=== Historical university ===
In 1455 Pope Nicholas V granted the Archbishop of Trier, Jakob I. von Sierck, the right to establish a university. The University of Trier was founded 16 March 1473. Battling financial problems for decades, the university was acquired by the Jesuits in 1560. They emphasized the philosophical and theological faculties at the expense of medicine and law. In the 1580s Peter Binsfeld was president of the university. In the 1730s Johann Nikolaus von Hontheim was also a faculty member. After the French occupation of the Rhineland, the French administration ordered the universities of Cologne, Mainz, Bonn and Trier closed, the last closing on 6 April 1798.

=== Modern university ===
After a hiatus of some 172 years the University of Trier was re-established in 1970 by the state of Rhineland-Palatinate as a constituent member of the twin University of Trier-Kaiserslautern, with 360 students matriculating in Trier on 15 October 1970. In 1975 the twin university was split into two independent universities. In 1977, the current university campus in Tarforst was opened and during the 1990s a nearby former French military hospital complex (dating from the French military presence in Germany following the Second World War) was acquired by the university and now forms a second campus, dubbed Campus II.

The General Students Committee (German: Allgemeiner Studierendenausschuss, or AStA for short) put forward a proposal to change the university's official name to the Karl Marx University of Trier (German: Karl-Marx-Universität Trier), in honour of perhaps the city's most famous son. Although the proposal was rejected by university authorities, the General Students Committee still referred to the university as "Karl-Marx-Universität Trier", until a new coalition was formed in the students parliament in 2015.

=== University seal ===
The modern university still uses the seal of the historical university in its corporate design. It contains the Latin motto "Treveris ex urbe deus complet dona sophiae" (God completes the favors of wisdom from the city of Trier). In 2000 an alternative logo incorporating that seal was introduced, but this met with resistance.

== Faculties ==
The university is divided into six faculties ("Fachbereiche").

- FB I – Pedagogy, Philosophy, Psychology (c. 2300 students)
- FB II – Linguistics, Literature, Media (c. 2700 students)
- FB III – Egyptology, Papyrology, History, Archeology, Art history, Politics (c. 1700 students)
- FB IV – Economics, Business, Sociology, Mathematics, Computer Science (c. 3300 students)
- FB V – Law (c. 1800 students)
- FB VI – Geography, Geosciences (c. 1600 students)

There is also a Faculty of (Catholic) Theology, affiliated to the university but administratively independent. It has about 300 students.

== Student demographics ==
Foreign Students at the university (WS 2004/05)
Country	Students	Percentage
Luxembourg	424	22.2%
China	290	15.2%
Bulgaria	133	7.0%
Poland	86	4.5%
Romania	70	3.7%
Turkey	56	2.9%
France	52	2.7%
Italy	50	2.6%
Russia	48	2.5%
Ukraine	43	2.3%

- WS 2001/02: 11,867 students
- WS 2002/03: 12,660 students
- WS 2003/04: 13,082 students
- WS 2004/05: 13,327 students
- WS 2005/06: 13,755 students
- WS 2006/07: 13,932 students
- WS 2007/08: 13,982 students
- WS 2008/09: 14,639 students
- WS 2009/10: 14,612 students
- WS 2010/11: 14,931 students
- WS 2011/12: 15,260 students
- WS 2012/13: 15,165 students

While there is a considerable number of foreign students in Trier, a large majority of students hail from Rhineland-Palatinate and the adjacent German states of Saarland and Northrhine-Westphalia. This situation has been exacerbated by the introduction of tuition fees in all German states except Rhineland-Palatine, with the University of Trier having experienced an increase in the number of students from other German states—especially the neighbouring states—matriculating or transferring there. The SPD, the governing party in Rhineland-Palatinate, does not plan to introduce tuition fees.

== Notable alumni ==
- Mutsuko Ayano – Japanese PhD student murdered while work on a doctorate in German.
- Elmar Nass – Catholic theologian, priest, social economist, and academic at the Cologne University of Catholic Theology (KHKT).
- Mervat Seif el-Din – classical archaeologist and former director of the Graeco-Roman Museum.
- René Dirven - cognitive linguist.
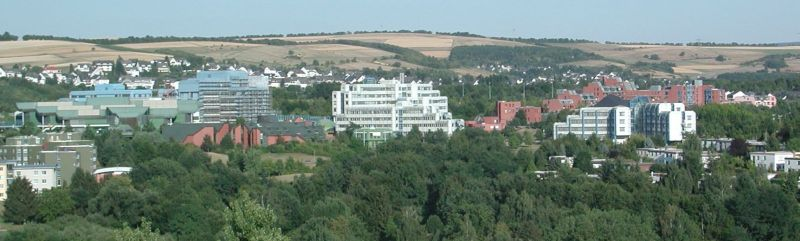
Campus

== See also ==
- Institute for Environmental and Technology Law
- List of medieval universities
