= Graeco-Roman Museum =

Archaeological museum located in Alexandria, Egypt

Coordinates: 31.199259°N 29.906872°E

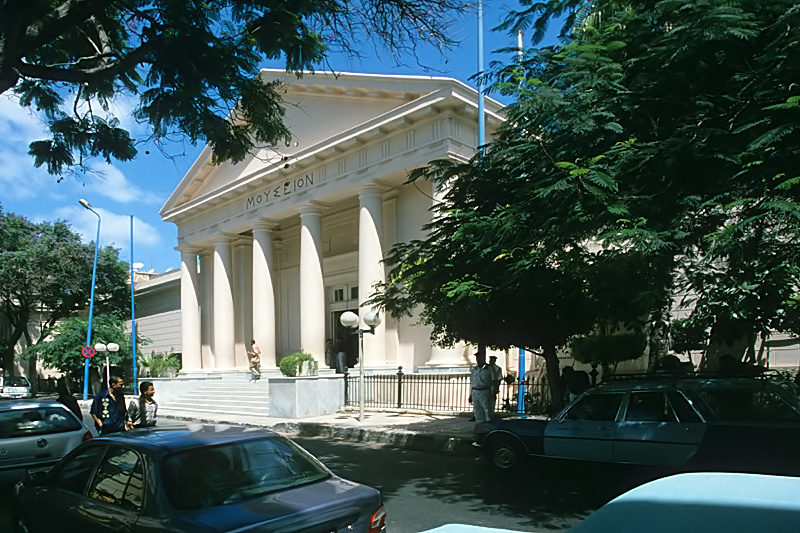
- Main entrance
- Established: 17 October 1892
- Location: Al Mesallah Sharq, Al Attarin; Alexandria, Egypt
- Architect: Giuseppe Botti
- Website: graeco-romanmuseum.com

The Graeco-Roman Museum is an archaeological museum located in Alexandria, Egypt. Its collection of over 40,000 objects includes sculptures, mosaics, woodwork, and coins.

== History ==
Erected in 1892, it was first built in a five-room apartment, inside one small building on Rosetta Street (later Avenue Canope and now Horriya). In 1895, it was transferred to another, larger building near Gamal Abdul Nasser Street. Its first director was Giuseppe Botti. From 1904 to 1932 he was followed by Evaristo Breccia and then Achille Adriani. The museum was inaugurated in 1895 by Khedive Abbas II. The museum edited the Bulletin of the Alexandria Archaeological Society.

The museum contains several pieces dating from the Greco-Roman (Ptolemaic) era in the 3rd century BC, such as a sculpture of Apis in black granite, the sacred bull of the Egyptians, mummies, sarcophagus, tapestries, and other objects offering a view of Greco-Roman civilization in contact with ancient Egypt.

The museum's collection is the product of donations from wealthy Alexandrians as well as of excavations led by successive directors of the institution, both within the town and in its environs. Certain other objects have come from the Organization of Antiquities at Cairo (particularly those of the Pharaonic period) and from various digs undertaken at the beginning of the century in Fayoum and at Benhasa. Housed within a historic building whose beautiful neoclassical facade of six columns and pediment bears the large inscription in Ancient Greek: MOYΣEION, romanized: MOUSEION, lit. 'place of the Muses' (museum). The museum consists of 27 halls and an attractive garden. From 1970 to 1974, Soheir Bakhoum was curator.

The museum was closed for renovations in 2005. In February 2022 the Secretary-General of the Supreme Council of Antiquities, Mostafa Waziri, said that the museum would be opened within a few months. On 11 October 2023, Egyptian Prime Minister Mostafa Madbouly attended the reopening of the museum, following 18 years of renovations.

== Directors ==
- 1892–1903, Giuseppe Botti
- 1904–1932, Evaristo Breccia
- Achille Adriani
- 2004–2010, Mervat Seif el-Din

== Gallery ==
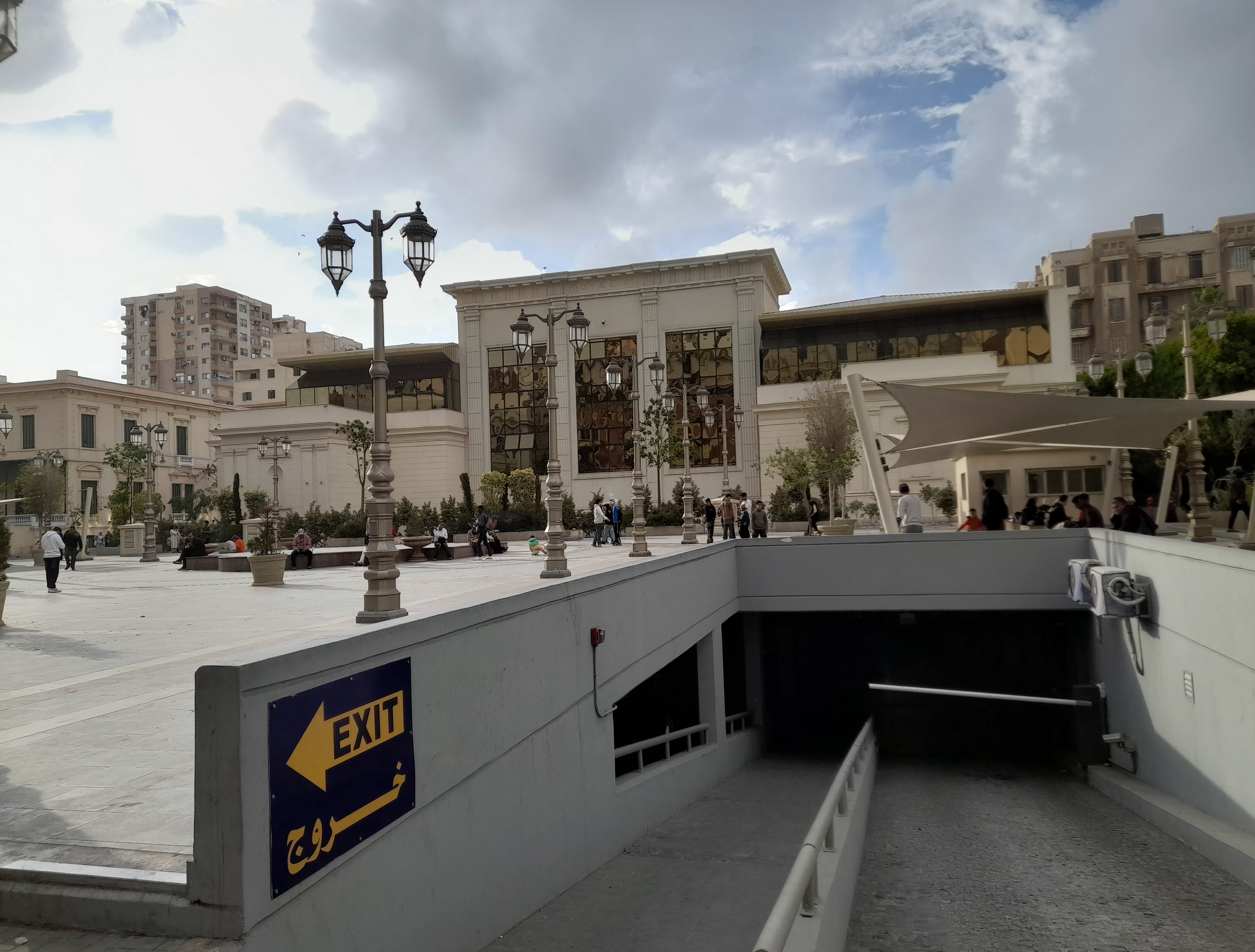
View of the museum's rear area

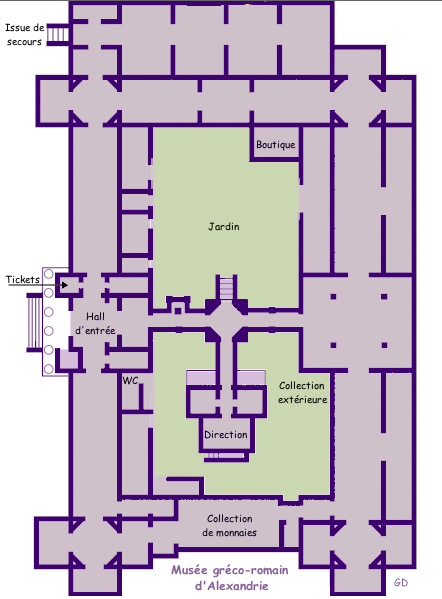
Floor plan

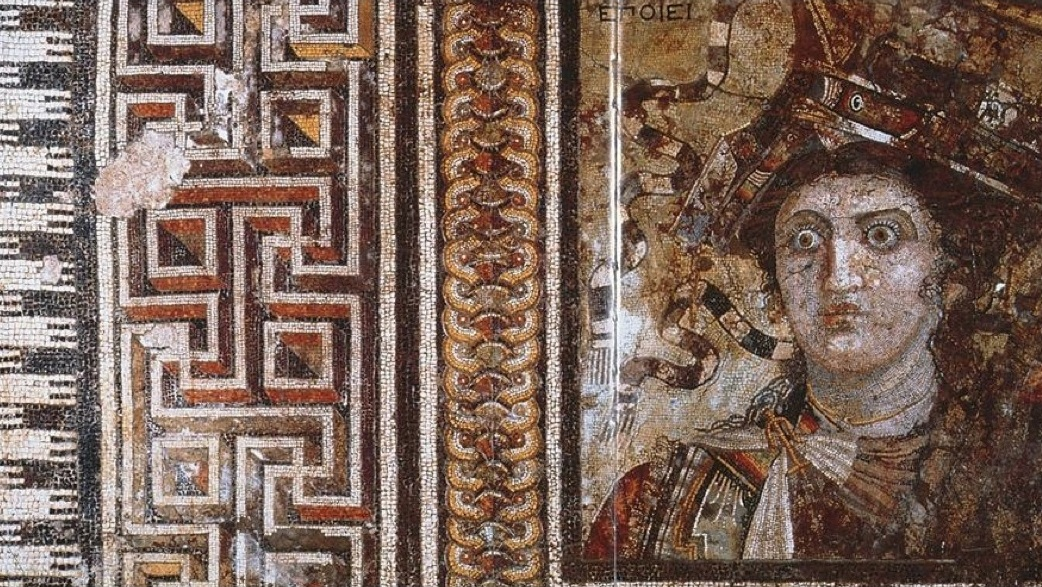
Sophilos Mosaic

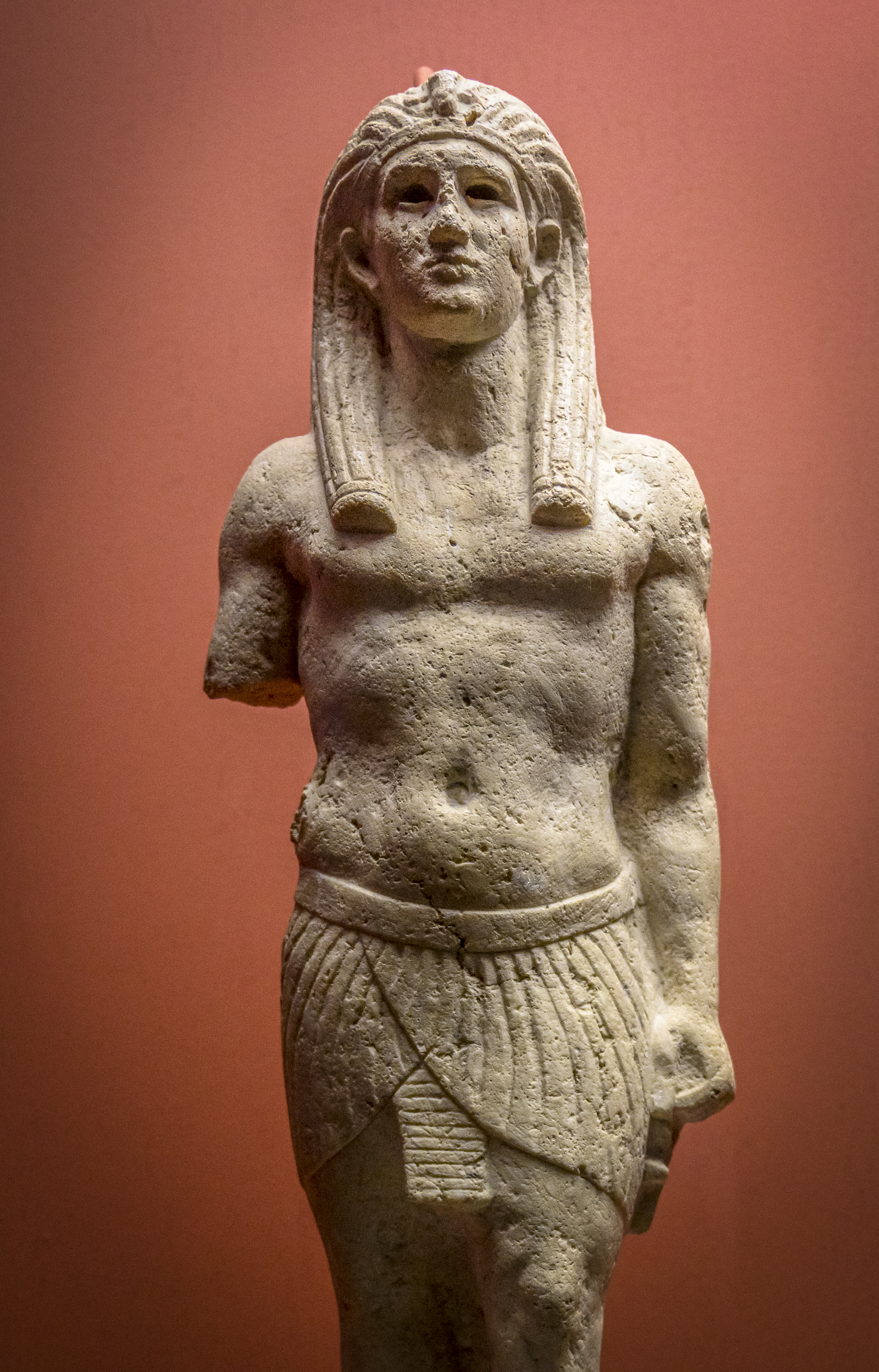
Osiris-Antinous in marble 2nd century CE

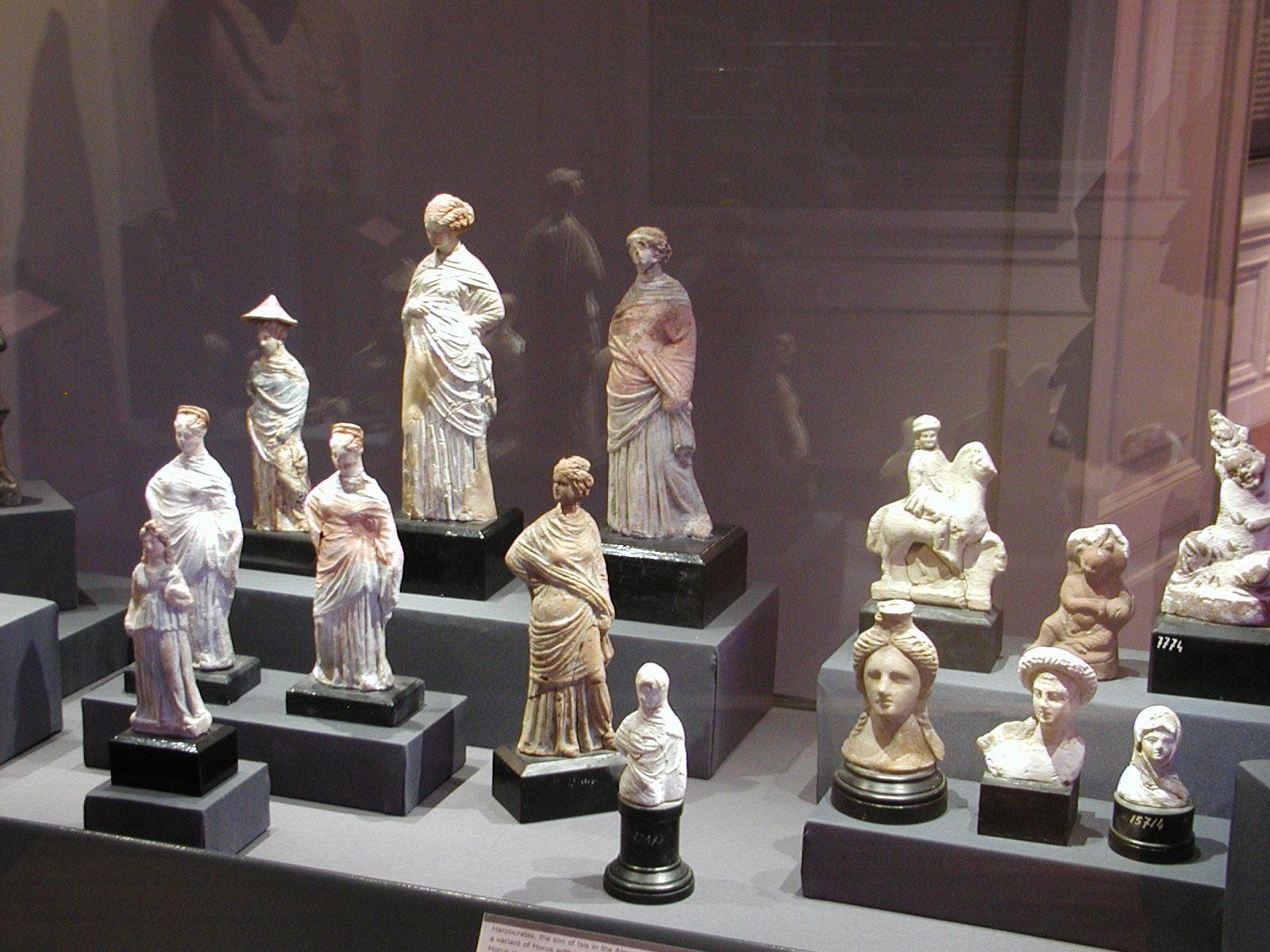
Figurines

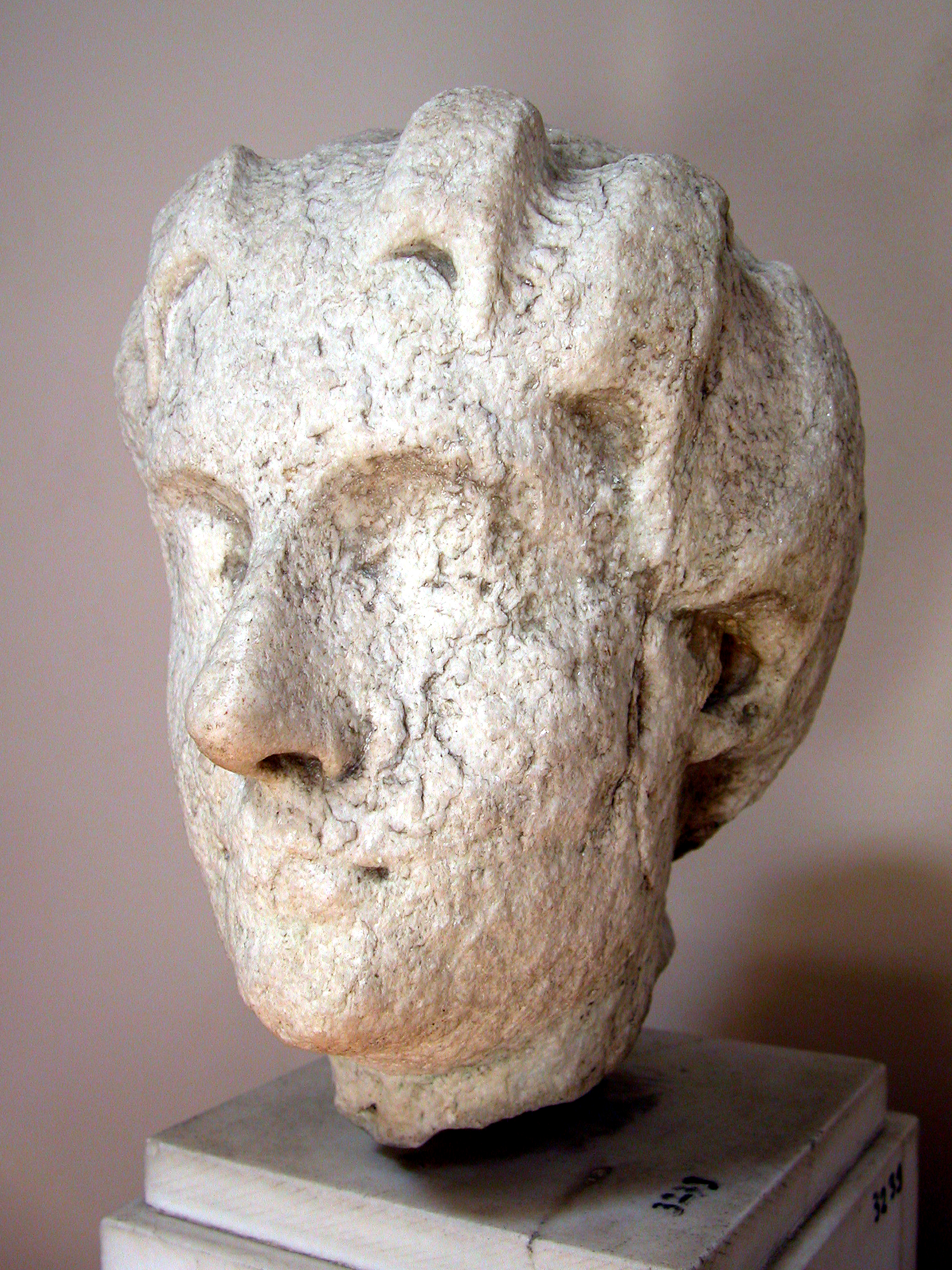
Cleopatra

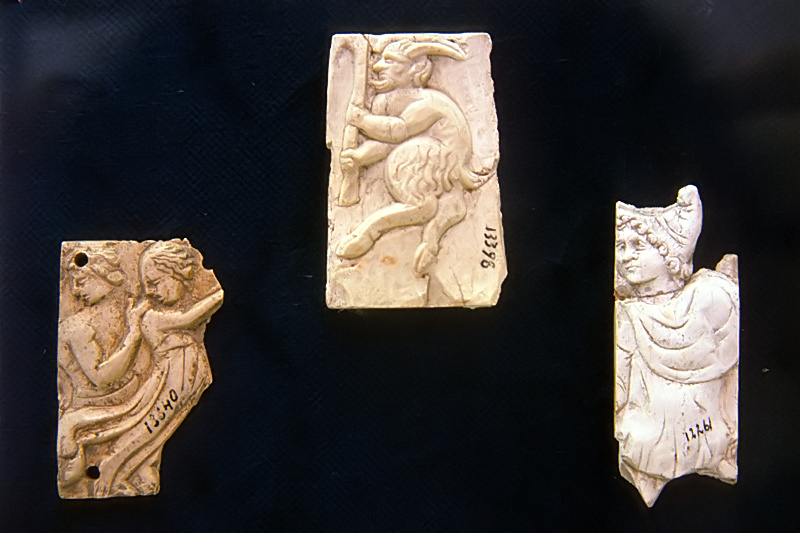
Carved bone plaques

== See also ==
- Museums in Alexandria
