= Britto of Trier =

Bishop of Trier

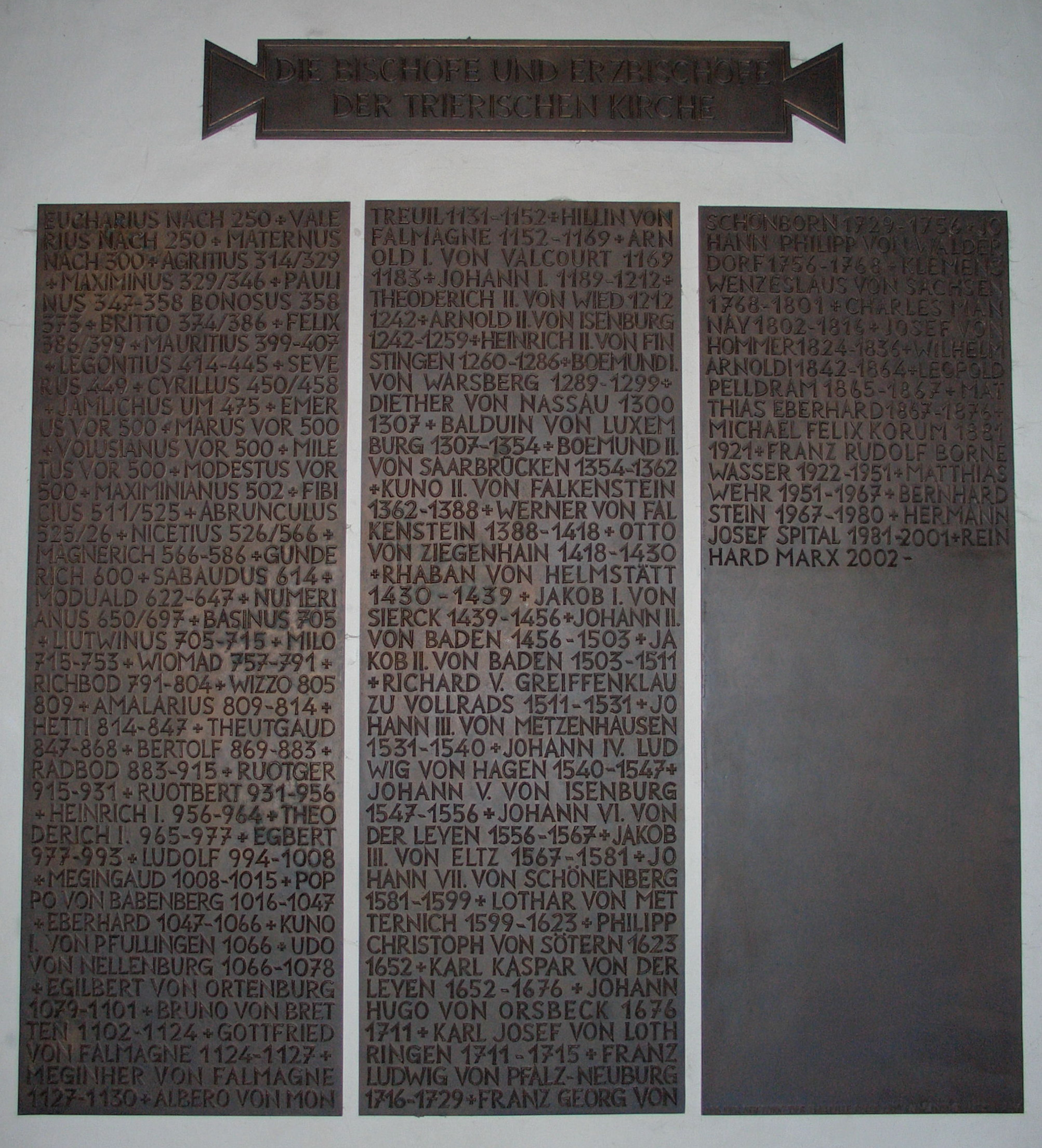
Tabula Episcoporum Trevirensium

Britto of Trier (fl. 374–386) was bishop of Trier.

== Biography ==
Britto is first known from a meeting of the bishops of Gaul in 374, held at Valence on the Rhône. Britto claimed there that apostate Christians from the persecution under Emperor Julian (361–363) could return to church under certain conditions. He was also a representative of the Church of Gaul to the synod of Rome of 382, chaired by Pope Damasus I. This meeting addressed a letter to the bishops of the East. Britto was the third signatory after by Pope Damasus and Bishop Ambrosius.

He was also at the court of the Roman emperor, Maximus, in Trier for the trial of Priscillian, who was accused of heresy and sorcery. It was here that he met Martin of Tours and Ambrose of Milan who had travelled to Trier and tried in vain to prevent the execution of Priscillian.

Britto died 385 or 386. His grave is in St. Paulinus' Church, Trier. He is venerated as a saint in the diocese of Trier, where his feast day is 6 May.

Titles of the Great Christian Church
Preceded by Bonosus	Bishop of Trier; 384 – 386	Succeeded by Felix
