= Felix of Trier =

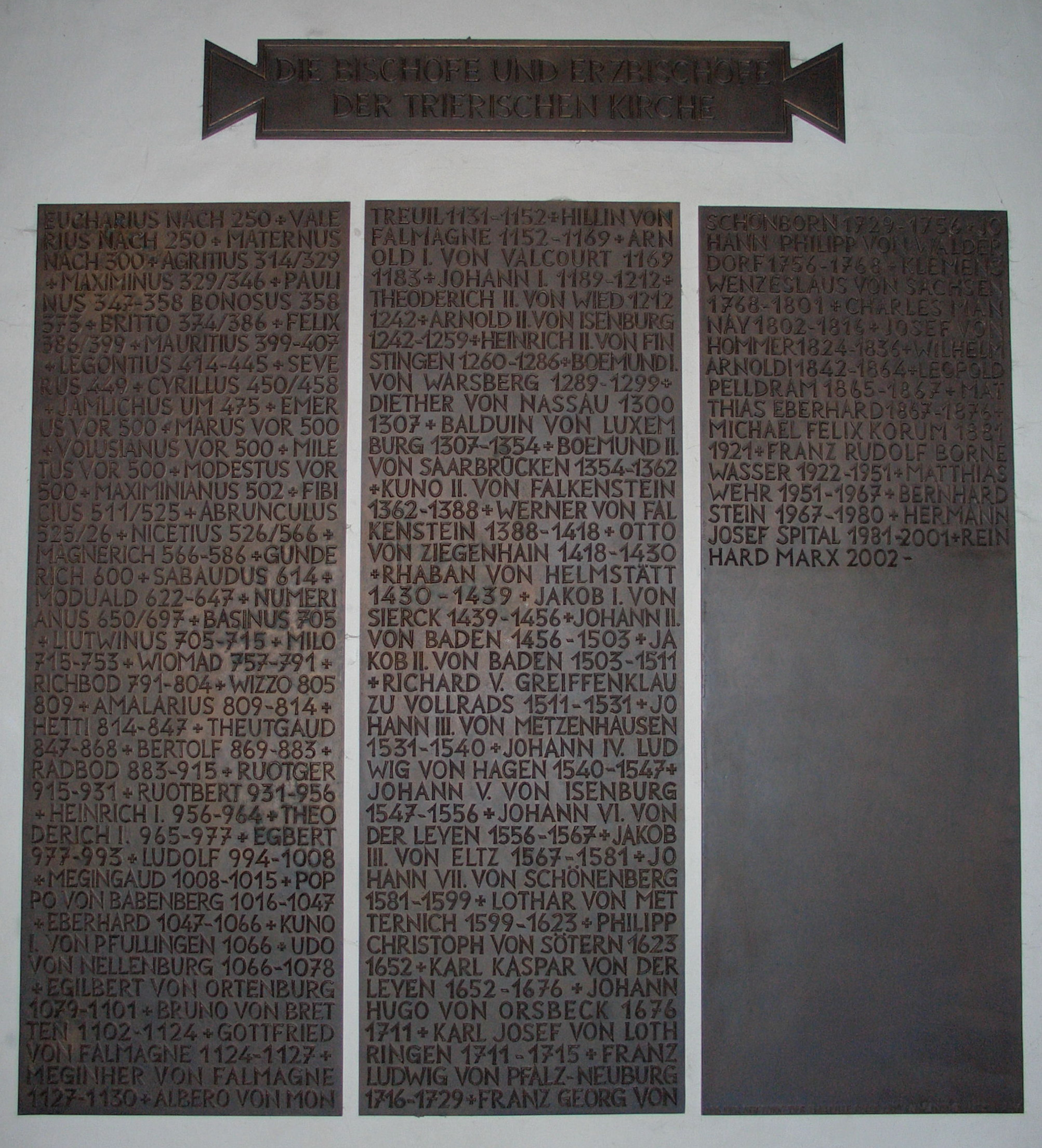
Tabula Episcoporum Trevirensium

Felix of Trier (fl. c. 386–399) was bishop of Trier from around 386 to 398.

His episcopate was marked by the trial of Priscillian and his followers and their subsequent execution for heresy and witchcraft, which can be seen as the first inquisitorial action in the Church.

The death sentences against Priscillian and his followers, despite the vigorous opposition of many bishops of the West, including celebrities such as Martin of Tours and Ambrose of Milan, were to have bitter consequences for Felix: Pope Siricius, Martin of Tours, Ambrose of Milan and other bishops broke off fellowship with all the bishops who took part in the trial of Priscillian. Felix was accused of not having campaigned vigorously enough against the verdict.

At a Synod of Bishops in 398 at Turin all bishops were readmitted to communion with Rome, provided that they undertook to have nothing to do with Felix, who was thus largely isolated. In 398 he renounced his bishopric.

Felix returned the relics of Paulinus of Trier from Phrygia to Trier and built a church to house them which is among the predecessors of the present St. Paulinus' Church, in the crypt of which he is buried.

His feast day is 26 March.

Titles of the Great Christian Church
Preceded by Britto	Bishop of Trier; 384 – 398	Succeeded by Mauritius II
