= Heusenstamm =

- Town
- Coat of arms

- Location of Heusenstamm within Offenbach district
- Interactive map of Heusenstamm
- Location within Germany Location within Hesse
- Coordinates: 50°03′N 8°48′E
- Country: Germany
- State: Hesse
- Admin. region: Darmstadt
- District: Offenbach
- Subdivisions: 2 Stadtteile

Government
  - Mayor (2021–27): Steffen Ball (CDU)

Area
  - Total: 19.03 km^{2} (7.35 sq mi)
- Elevation: 121 m (397 ft)

Population (2025-12-31)
  - Total: 19,397
  - Density: 1,019/km^{2} (2,640/sq mi)
- Time zone: UTC+01:00 (CET)
  - Summer (DST): UTC+02:00 (CEST)
- Postal codes: 63150
- Dialling codes: 06104, 06106
- Vehicle registration: OF
- Website: www.heusenstamm.de

Heusenstamm (German pronunciation: [ˈhɔʏzn̩ˌʃtam]) is a town of over 19,000 people as of 2025 in the Offenbach district in the Regierungsbezirk of Darmstadt in Hesse, Germany.

== Geography ==
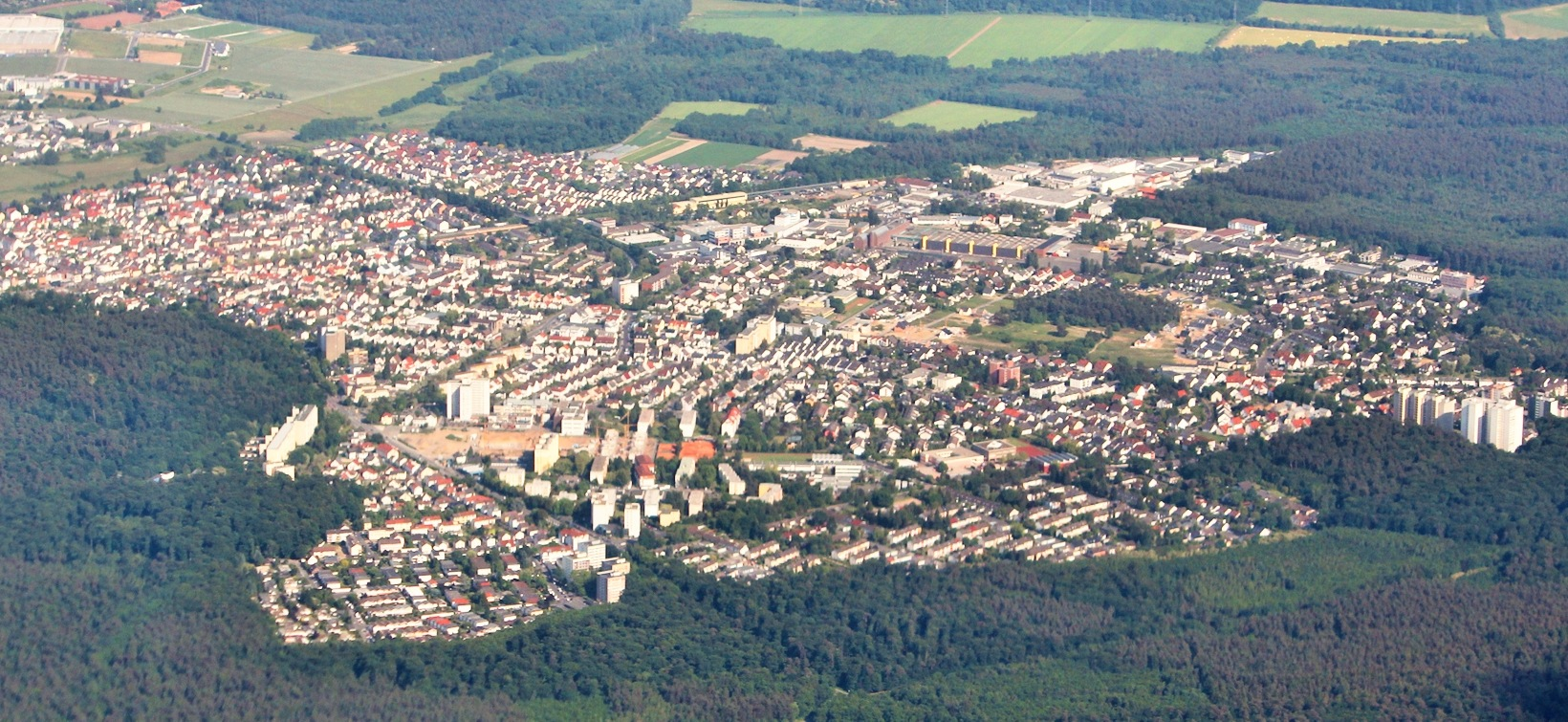
Overview of Heusenstamm with surrounding forest

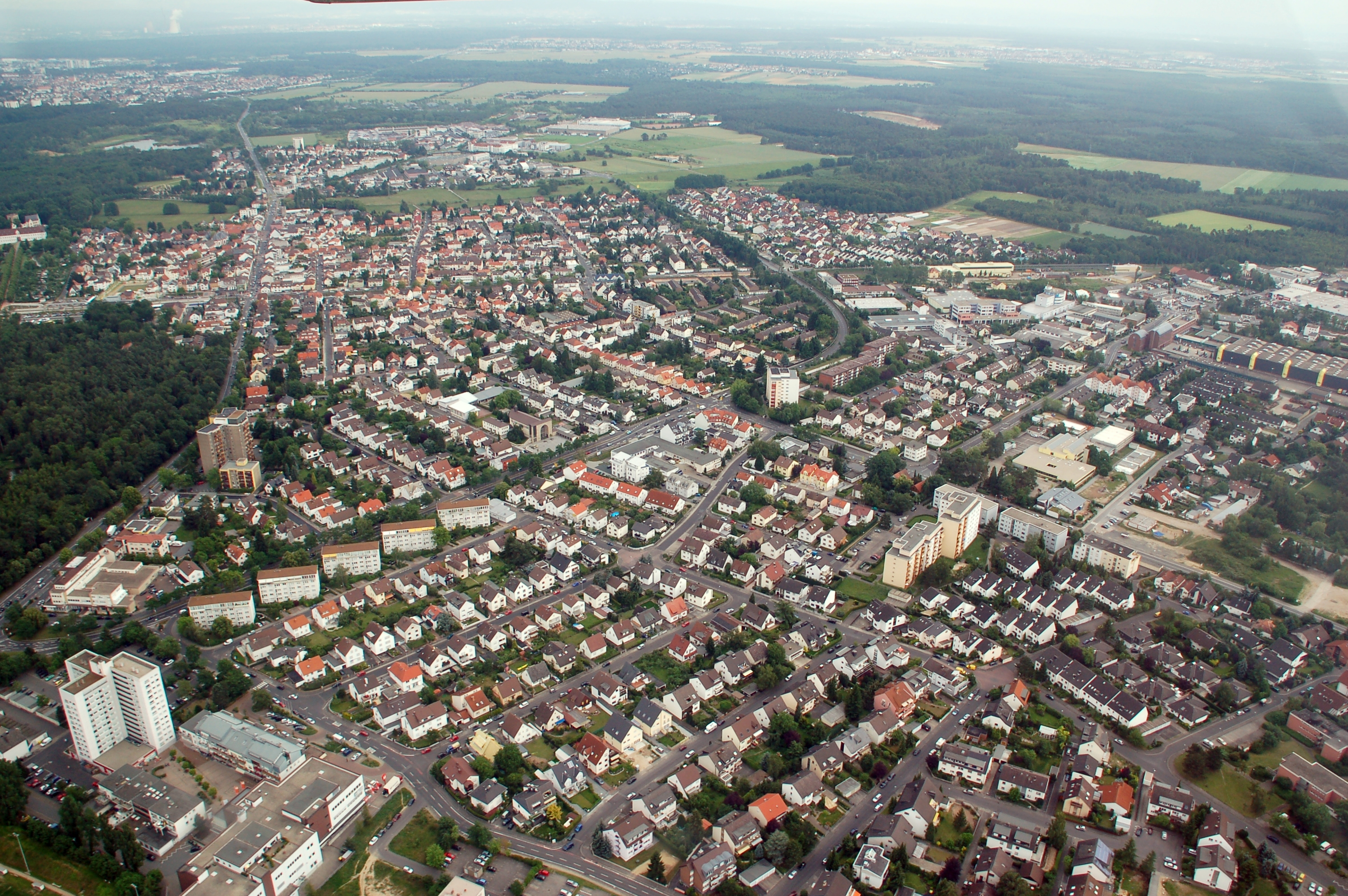
Aerial view 2007

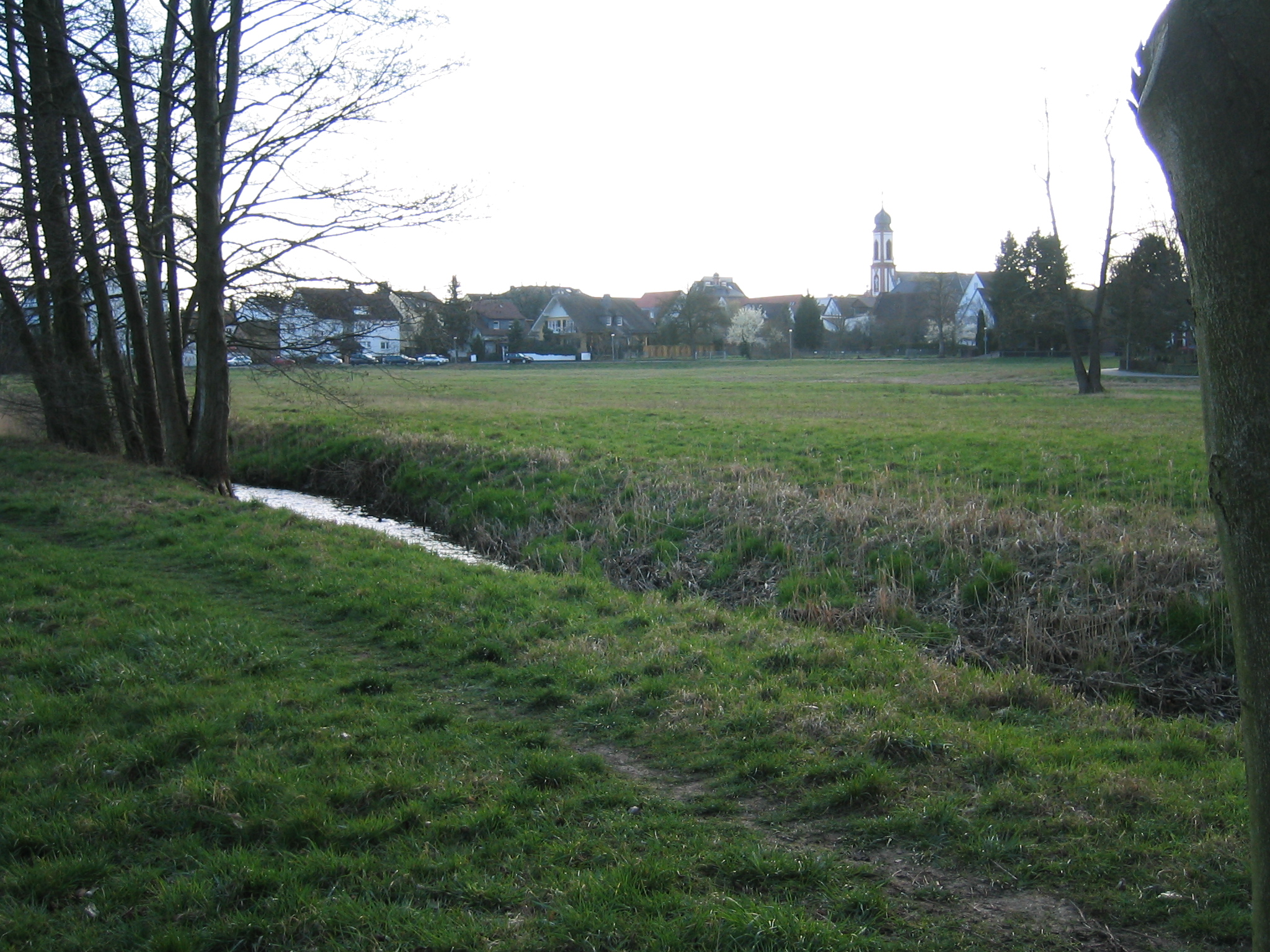
View of Heusenstamm with the river Bieber in the foreground

=== Location ===
Heusenstamm is one of 13 towns and communities in the Offenbach district. The town lies in the Frankfurt Rhine Main Region south of Frankfurt am Main and Offenbach am Main at an average elevation of 121 m above sea level. The town lies on the river Bieber. The lowest natural point is the Bieber's riverbed, and the highest is the Hoher Berg ("High Mountain"). Darmstadt, the seat of the Regierungsbezirk, is located to the southwest. Heusenstamm lies in the southern part of Hesse, not far from the Mittelgebirge of the Odenwald and Spessart.

=== Neighbouring communities ===
Heusenstamm borders in the north on the district-free city of Offenbach am Main, in the northeast on the town of Obertshausen, in the southeast on the town of Rodgau, in the south on the town of Dietzenbach, and in the west on the town of Dreieich.

=== Constituent communities ===
Heusenstamm's Stadtteile are Heusenstamm, with 16,266 inhabitants and Rembrücken, with 2,116 inhabitants (each time at 31 December 2006).

Also constituting Stadtteile of a kind are the residential neighbourhoods of Waldesruhe and Patershausen.

== History ==
In 1211, Heusenstamm had its first documentary mention in an Eppstein fief book in which Gottfried of Eppstein documented that he held the castle and village of Huselstam in fief from the Empire and that he had further bestowed these holdings upon Eberhard Waro von Hagen-Heusenstamm. The place was later called Husinstam and, beginning in the 15th century, Heussenstain. About the middle of the 12th century, Eberhard Waro von Hagen-Heusenstamm had a moated castle built here. From the Middle Ages until 1819, Heusenstamm and Rembrücken belonged to the Biebermark, an area held in common with several other villages.

After the Lords of Eppstein died out, their position was filled by the new feudal lords, the Counts of Königstein, and later, beginning in 1581, by the Elector of Mainz. In 1545, Sebastian von Heusenstamm was chosen Archbishop-Elector of Mainz. In 1560 Eberhard von Heusenstamm gave leave to introduce Protestantism, but Roman Catholicism was reintroduced in 1607.

After the Lords of Heusenstamm died out in 1616, the castle and the lordship passed to the family's Austrian sideline, who then leased the place to the Frankfurt patrician Stephan von Cronstetten. During the Thirty Years' War, the village and the castle were almost utterly destroyed. In 1661, the lordship over Heusenstamm, to which also belonged the places of Obertshausen and Hausen, was sold to the Mainz Oberamtmann (chief local administrator) Philipp Erwein von Schönborn.

When Holy Roman Emperor Franz I was living at Schloss Heusenstamm in 1764 on the occasion of his son's coronation (Goethe relates the event in his Dichtung und Wahrheit), an ostentatious tower was built in his honour, which stands to this day. In 1806, the Schönborn Amt of Heusenstamm with Obertshausen and Hausen was put under the Princes of Isenburg-Birstein. The Amt of Heusenstamm then passed to the Hesse-Darmstadt. In 1819, when the Biebermark was partitioned, Heusenstamm got its share of the forest. In 1896, the railway line from Offenbach by way of Heusenstamm to Dietzenbach, a branchline of the Rodgaubahn from Offenbach to Dieburg, was opened.

On 26 May 1959, Heusenstamm was granted town rights, thereby sidestepping Offenbach's efforts to absorb the community. Instead, the new town itself expanded by absorbing one of its neighbours, Rembrücken, in 1977 in the course of municipal reform. In 1978, the town bought the estate of Patershausen, the Klosterwald and the Forst Patershausen (both wooded properties) as well as the Forst Heusenstamm (another wooded property) from Rudolf Graf von Schönborn (“Graf” being his noble title, “Count”). The castle the town likewise acquired in 1979 from the Counts of Schönborn, converting it in the year that followed into the Town Hall.

== Demographics ==
=== Population growth ===
In the late 16th century, Heusenstamm had roughly 250 inhabitants. Almost all of them, however, fell victim to the Thirty Years' War and the plague. Since then, the population has been rising almost continuously and only in recent times has a slight decrease been noted.

Year	Population
1939	3,451
1950	4,459
1959*	5,500
1965	8,370
1975	14,314
2004	18,936
2005	18,600
2006	18,344

* This was the year when town rights were granted.

=== Religion ===
There is a Roman Catholic majority among Heusenstamm's population. The parishes of St.Cäcilia and Maria Himmelskron belong, like the Parish of Mariä Opferung in Rembrücken, to the Roman Catholic Diocese of Mainz. The state church Evangelical parish is part of the Evangelical Church in Hesse and Nassau whose seat is in Darmstadt. Moreover, since 1975 there has been the Free Evangelical parish (FeG), which belongs to the Association of Free Evangelical Parishes.

== Economy ==
Heusenstamm benefits from its proximity to the economic centre of Frankfurt am Main and the Frankfurt Rhine-Main region, as well as from its excellent transport connections.

=== Established businesses ===
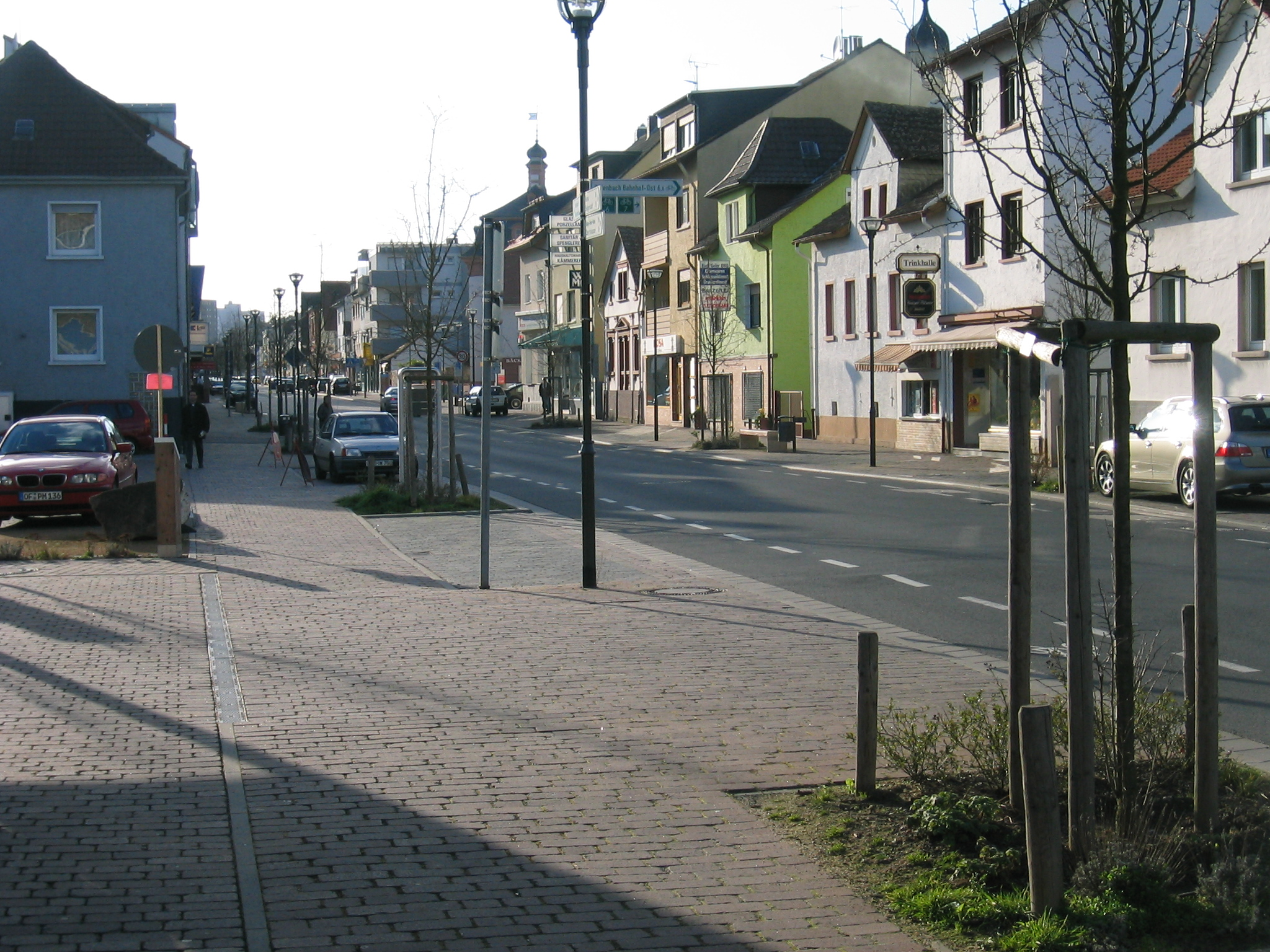
Frankfurter Straße – the main shopping street

Most established firms and businesses in Heusenstamm have organized themselves into the Gewerbeverein Heusenstamm e.V. (business association).

The biggest employer in the town of Heusenstamm is Deutsche Telekom AG with several hundred positions. The subsidiary T-Systems Business Services GmbH and the landline division maintain large real estate holdings in the town of Heusenstamm. Besides the many small and midsize businesses, Konica Minolta Business Solutions has its German representation here. Furthermore, BKK Mobil Oil, through its merger in 2008 with the former Krankenkasse Eintracht Heusenstamm (both the old and merged companies are institutions for sponsoring health insurance), has a seat here.

== Sports ==
Besides the nationally known Sportzentrum Martinsee lying on the town's outskirts, there are in Heusenstamm also the gymnastic and sport clubs’ smaller sport complexes across from the railway station, a sport hall, which together with the Im Forst all-weather swimming pool forms a single building, and the Alte Linde football pitch on Isenburger Straße.

Important sport clubs in Heusenstamm are:

- RK Heusenstamm (rugby) (Rugby-Bundesliga; German sevens champions 2006, several national players)
- TSV 1873 Heusenstamm (roughly 2300 members: artistic gymnastics, athletics, jiujitsu, judo, football and many more)
- TTC Heusenstamm (table tennis) (former Bundesligist, vicechampions, cowinners of the cup)
- TV Rembrücken (football, table tennis, riding and others)

== Government ==
=== Town council ===
The municipal election held on 26 March 2006 yielded the following results:

Parties and voter communities		% 2006	Seats; 2006	% 2001	Seats; 2001
CDU	Christian Democratic Union of Germany	50.1	19	47.3	17
SPD	Social Democratic Party of Germany	20.6	7	23.2	9
GREENS	Bündnis 90/Die Grünen	11.9	4	10.6	4
FDP	Free Democratic Party	7.2	3	5.9	2
FWH	Freie Wähler Heusenstamm	10.2	4	–	–
Bürgerblock	Bürgerblock	–	–	12.9	5
Total		100.0	37	100.0	37
Voter turnout in %		46.0		51.3	

=== Mayors ===
==== Grand Duchy of Hesse ====
- Wilhelm (1839 - ?)

==== German Empire and Weimar Republic ====
- Heinrich Augenthaler (1876 - 1885)
- Franz Winter (1885 - 1899)
- Adam Kraus (1899 - 1902)
- Joseph Kämmerer (1904-1933 - eventually SPD)

==== National Socialist times ====
- Heinrich Fickel (1933-1934 - NSDAP)
- Gustav Korn (1934-1936 - NSDAP)
- Hans Kuntsche (1936-1937 - NSDAP)
- Fritz Bosche (1937-1938 - NSDAP)
- Franz Wessiepe (1939-1945 - NSDAP)

==== United States military occupation ====
- Karl-L. Fauerbach (1946-1948) – democratically elected

==== Federal Republic of Germany ====
- Franz-Josef Amerschläger (1948-1956 - CDU)
- Johann Anton Hemberger (1956-1977 - independent)
- Adolf Kessler (1977-1987 - CDU)
- Josef Eckstein (1987-2003 - CDU)
- Peter Jakoby (2003–2015 - CDU)
- Halil Öztaş (2015–2021 - SPD)
- Steffen Ball (since 2021 - CDU)

=== Town twinning ===
- Saint-Savin (also called Saint-Savin sur Gartempe), Vienne, France since 1969
- Tonbridge, Kent, England, United Kingdom since 1984
- Malle, Antwerp, Belgium since 1991
- Ladispoli, Province of Rome, Lazio, Italy since 2001

=== Coat of arms ===
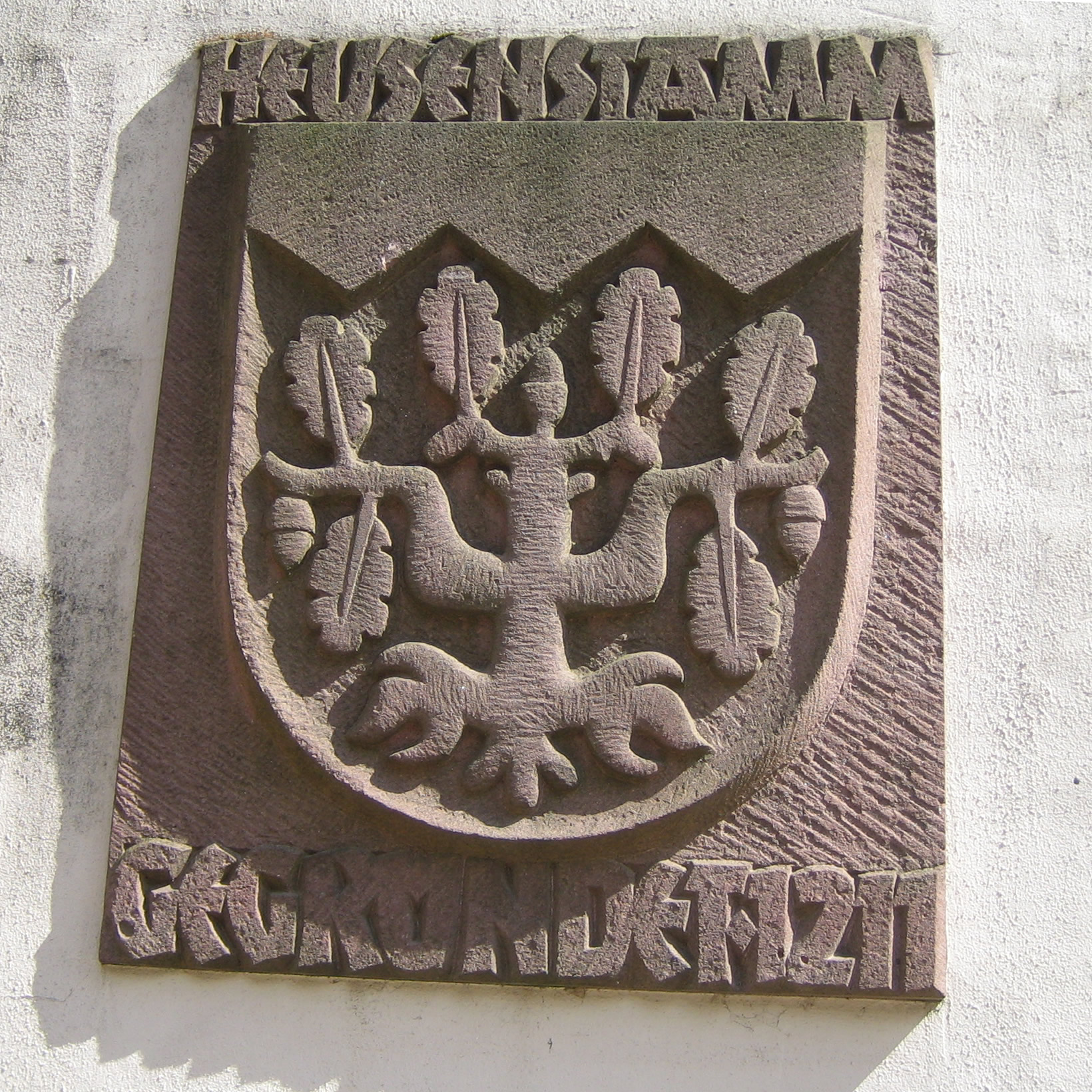
Coat of arms

The town's arms might be described thus: Argent an oak tree eradicated sprouting six leaves vert with three acorns Or, and a chief dancetty gules.

The chief (the red part at the top of the escutcheon) with its dancetty (zigzag) edge is drawn from the arms once borne by the Lords of Heusenstamm. The oak with the six leaves and three acorns symbolizes the affiliation with Dreieich (literally 'three oak').

== Arts and culture ==
=== Regular events ===
Among the yearly events are not only the Kultursommer, which since 1987 has been held around the Hinteres Schlösschen (“Little Schloss in the back”) and the Bannturm (tower) and with its many events draws visitors not only from Heusenstamm, but also the Nikolausmarkt (market), which stretches from the gateway arch through Schlossstraße and the palace garden all the way to the Bannturm, and the Weinfest, which has been held since 1996 at the Bannturm. The Kelterfest in autumn, staged by the Konkordia singing club, has established itself as a regular event in Heusenstamm. Since 2006, the Bahnhofsfest (“Railway Station Festival”) has also been a regular event in Heusenstamm.

=== Museums ===
The local museum (Heimatmuseum, featuring local lore and history) has as its main point the town's history and development. It is housed in a gatehouse and a side building, the Winterhaus, and among other things, is also a stop on the guided town tours that take visitors through the Old Town.

== Attractions ==
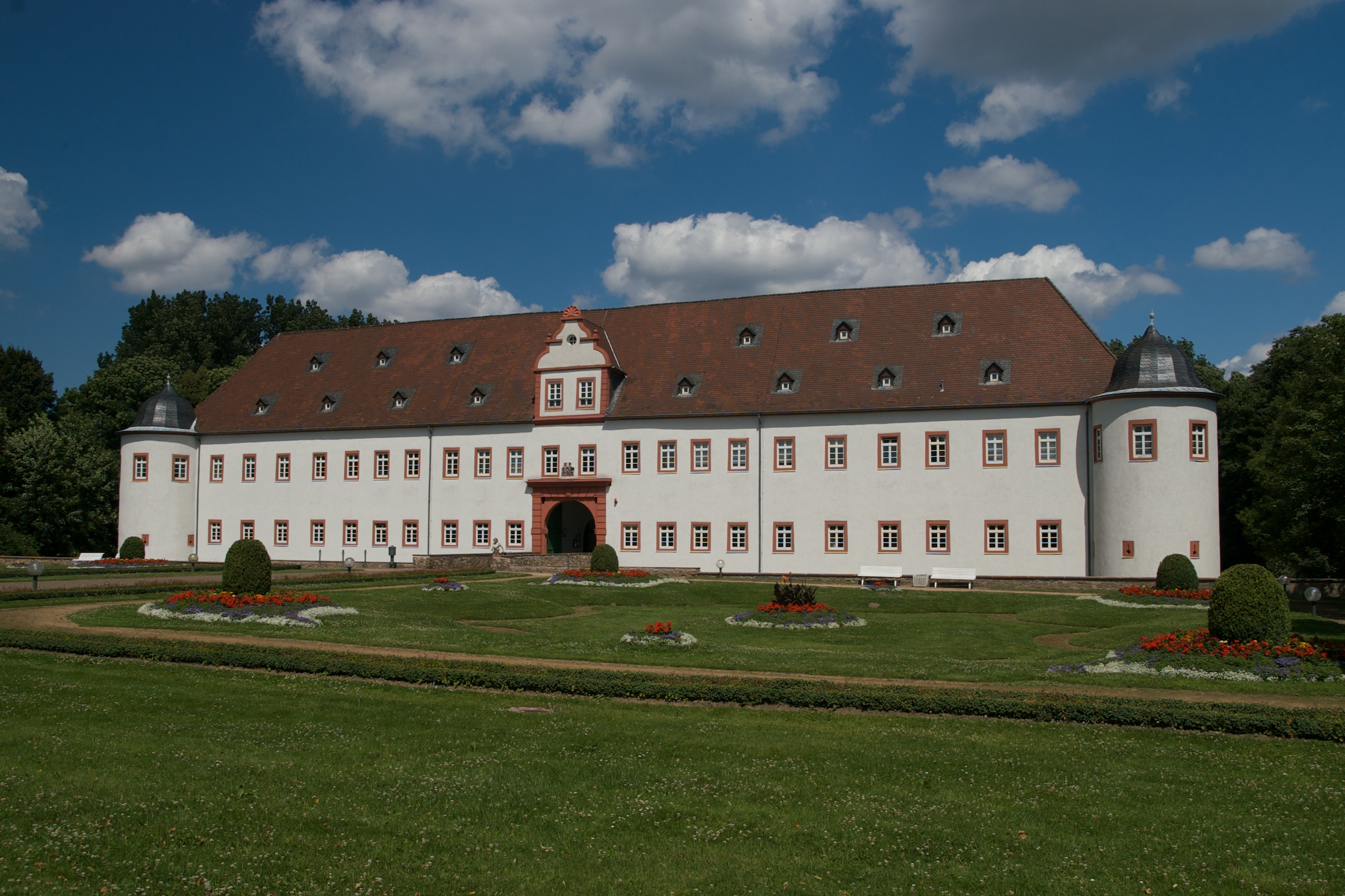
Schloss Schönborn

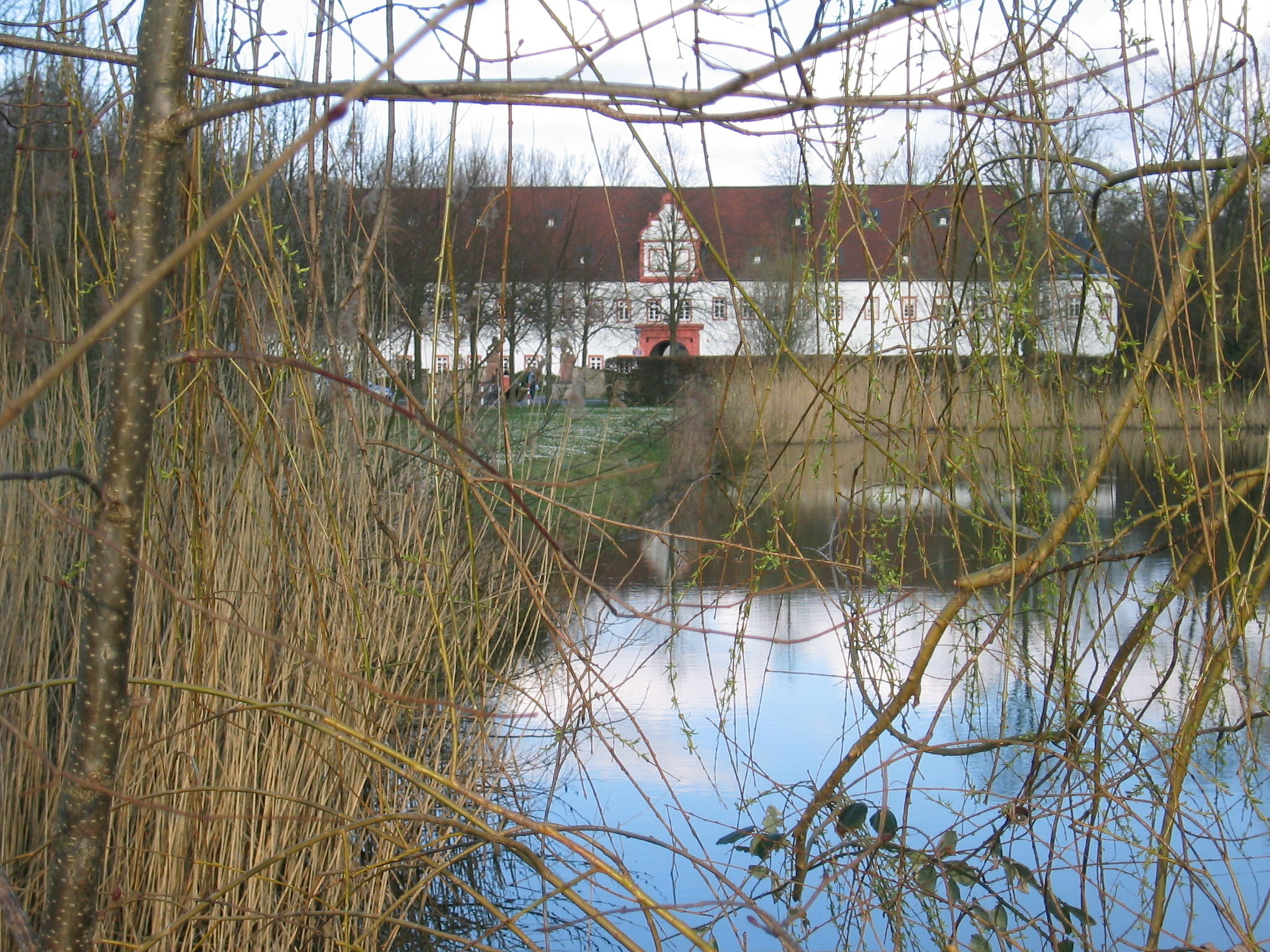
Impressions around ...

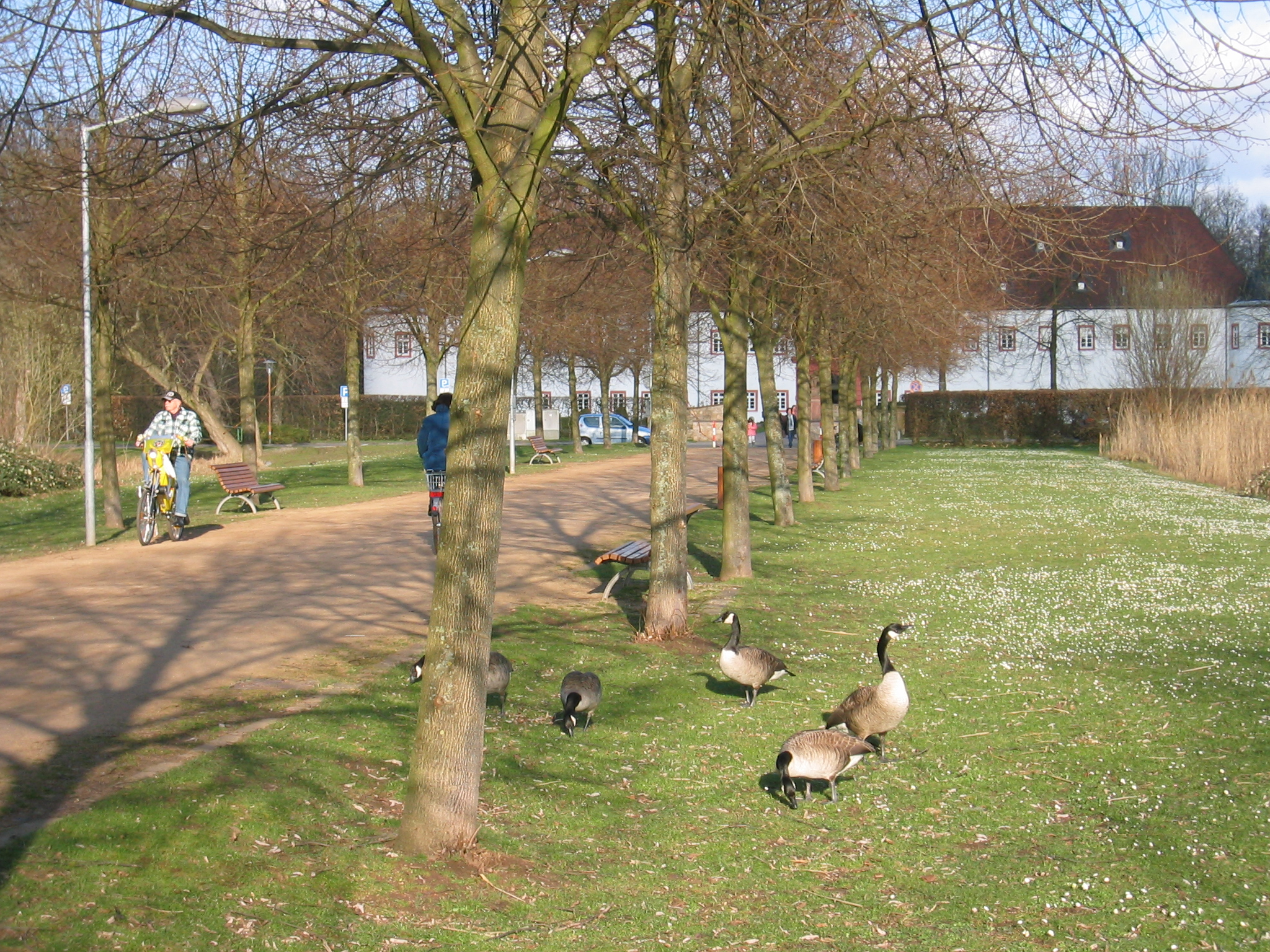
... the Schloss

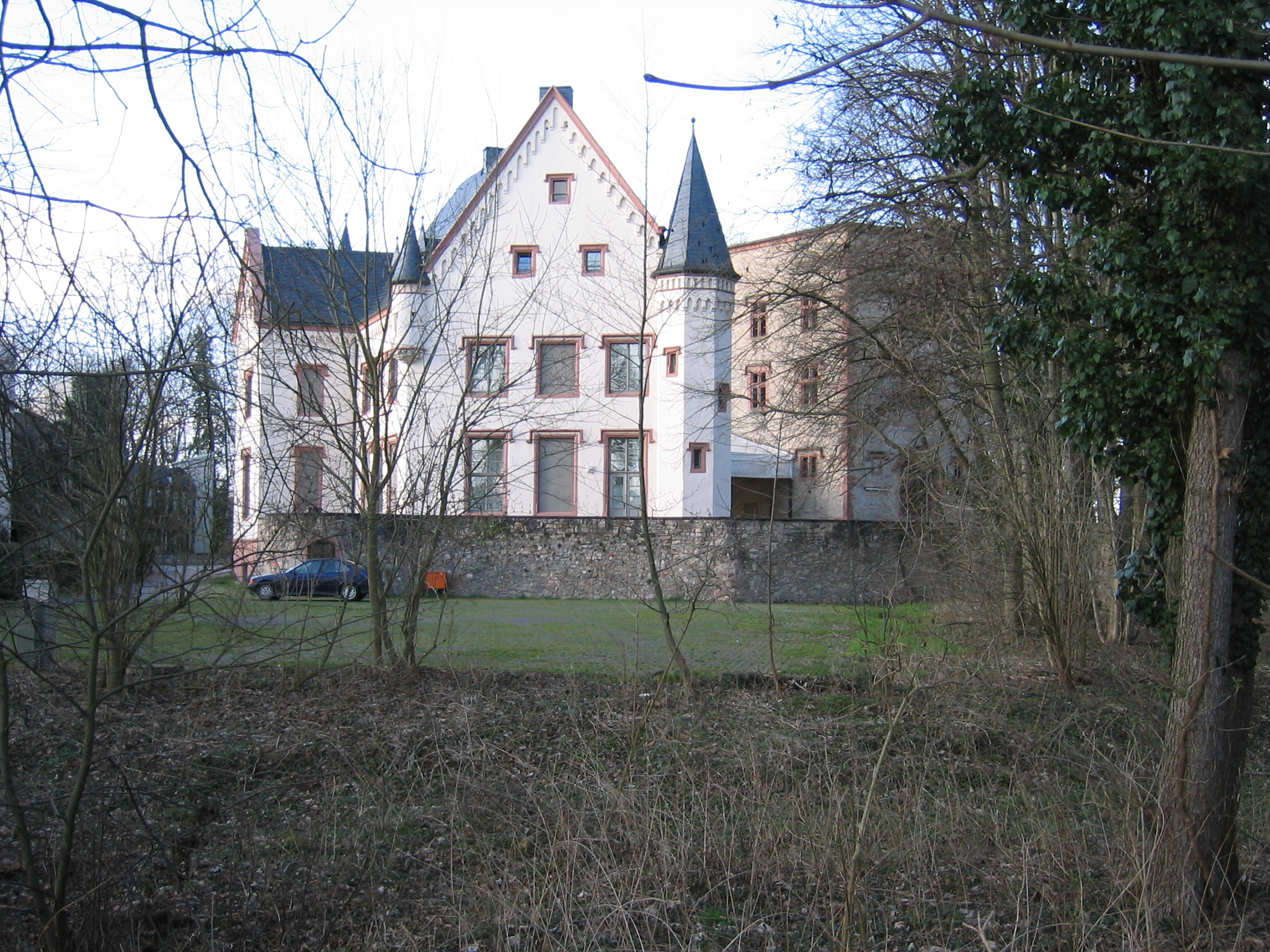
Little Schloss in the back, and Bannturm
- Schloss Heusenstamm (also Schloss Schönborn)
- Schlossmühle (mill)
- Torbau (18th-century gatehouse)
- Patershäuser Weg/Patershausen Estate
- Kapelle zum heiligen Kreuz ("Chapel of the Holy Cross")
- Stone cross on Patershäuser Weg
- Old Town Hall
- Old Town
- Düne am Galgen ("Dune at the Gibbet")
- Old Jewish graveyard in the woods
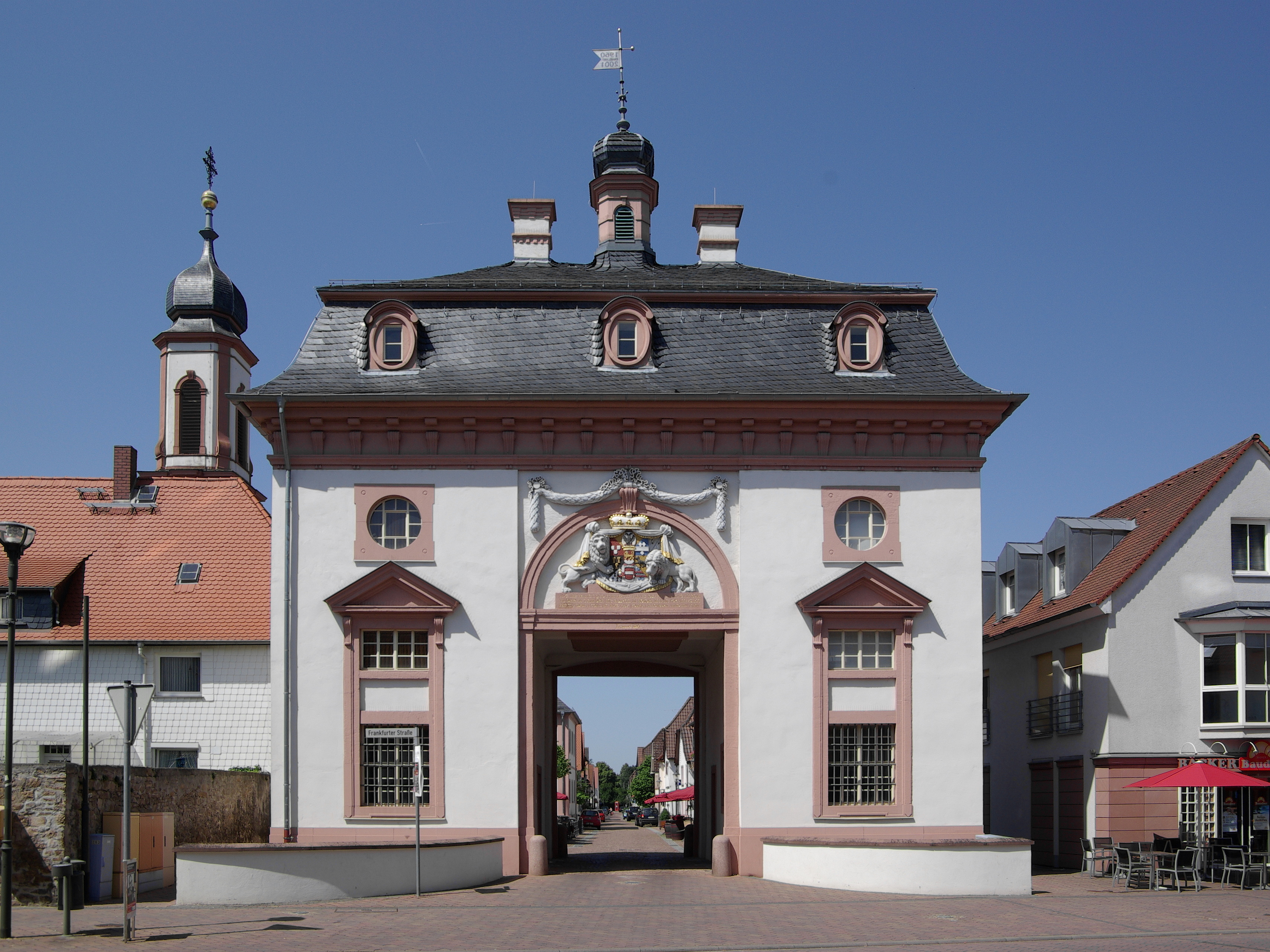
Torbau

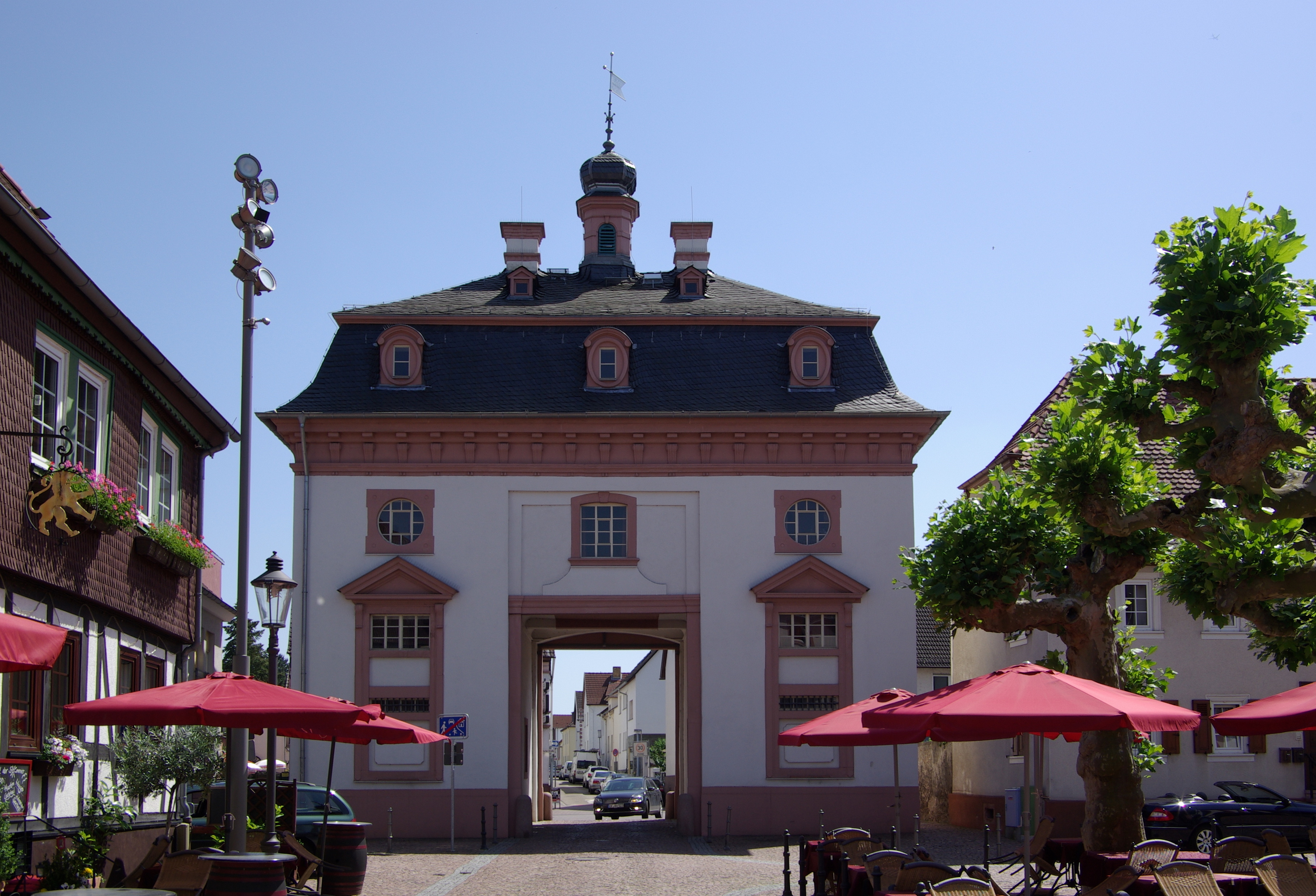
Torbau

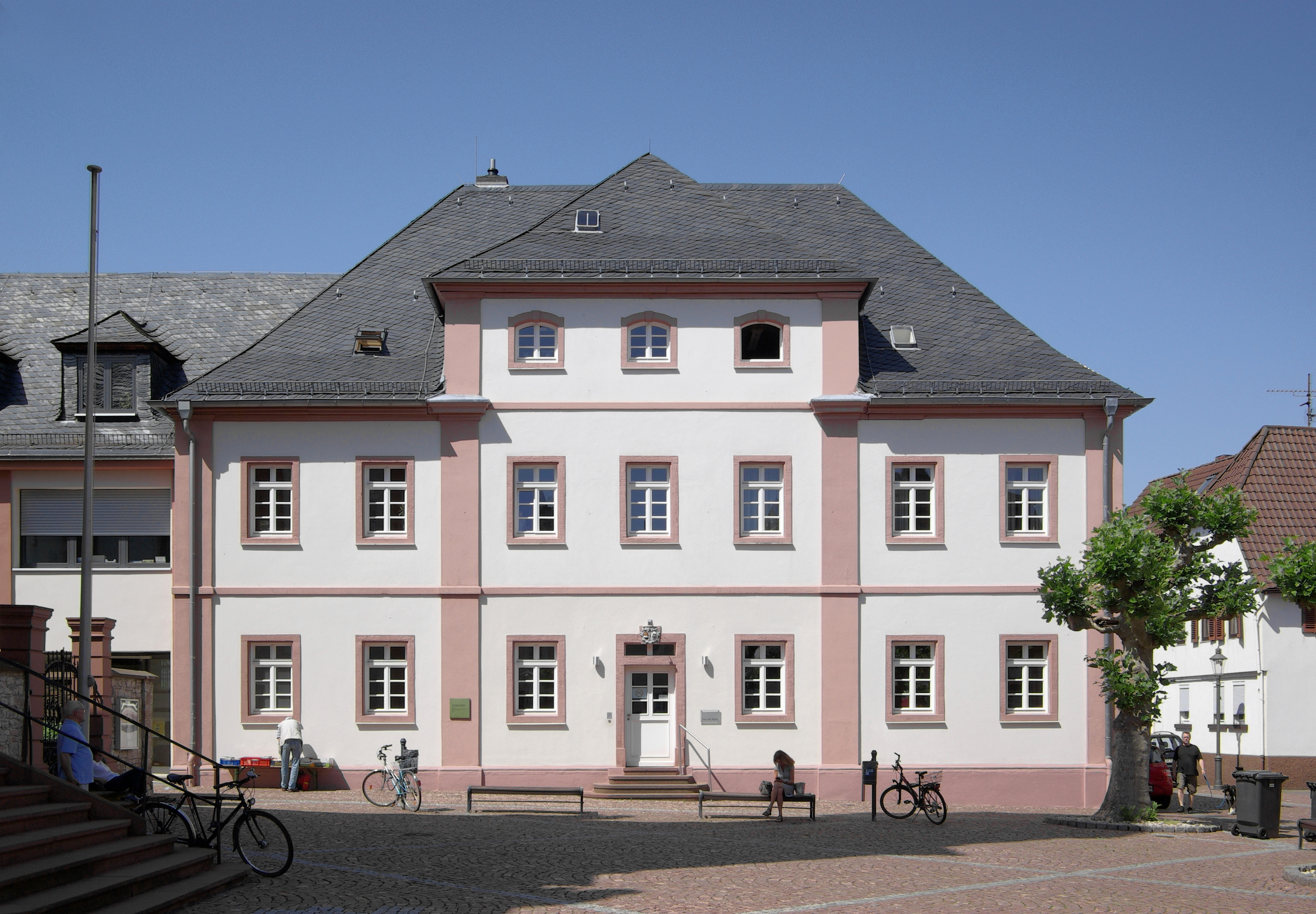
Old town hall

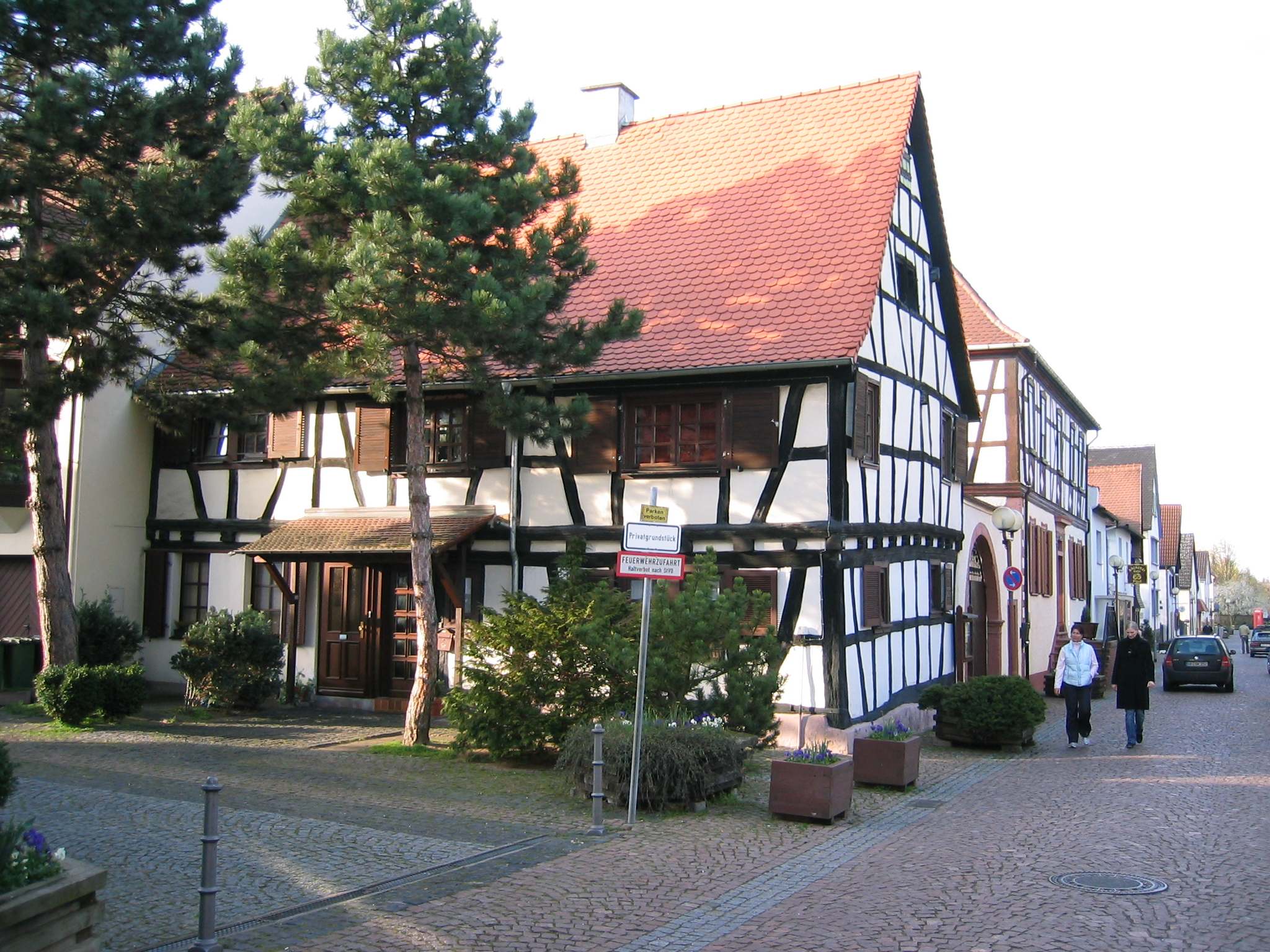
Schlossstraße ...

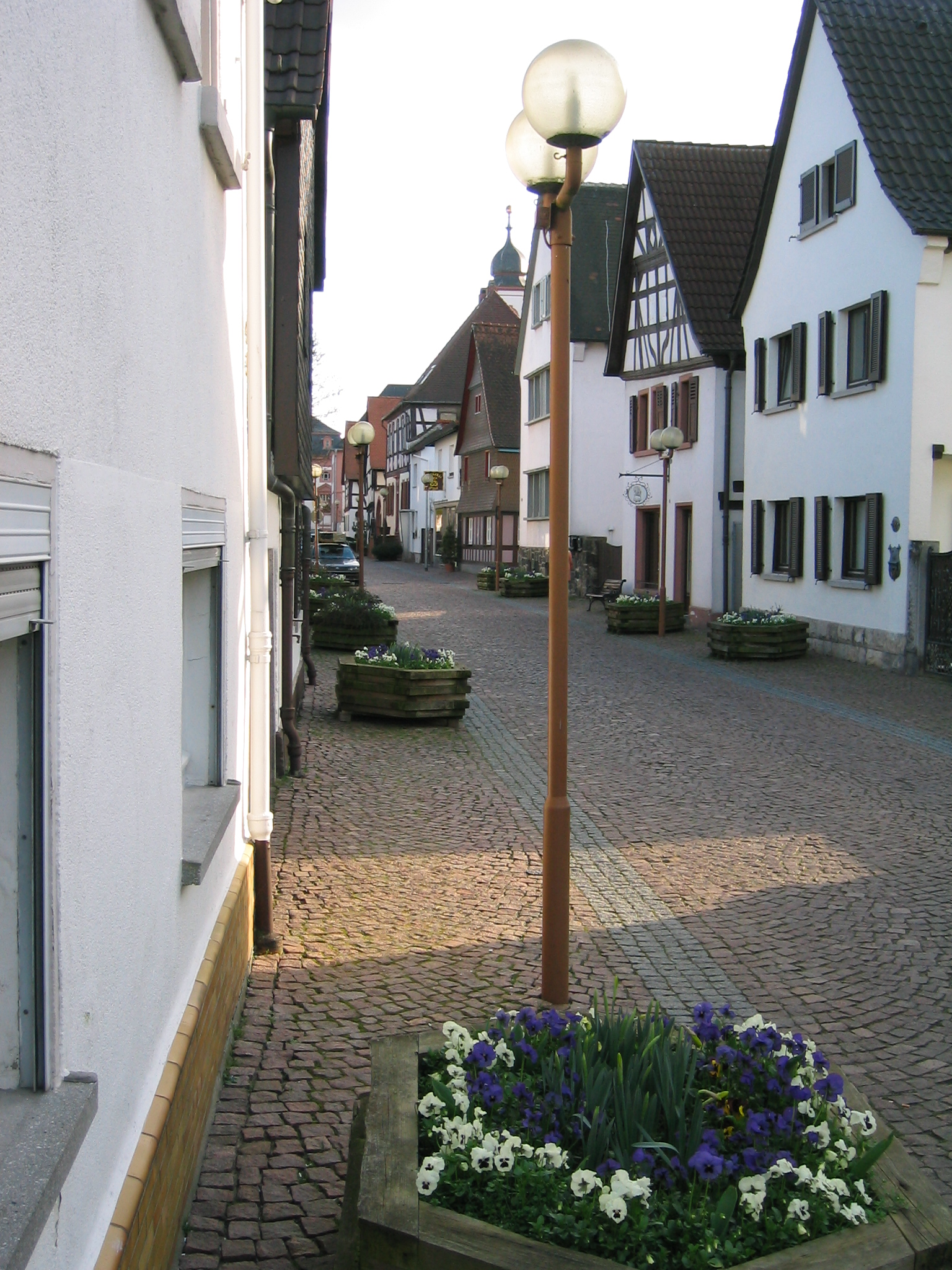
... or Unner Gass

=== Nature conservation areas ===
Heusenstamm is also known as the Stadt im Grünen ('Town in the Green'). That reflects on the one hand the above-average proportion of woodland within its municipal area, and on the other hand the presence of two large nature conservation areas, See am Goldberg and Nachtweide von Patershausen. Both are popular outing destinations for citizens, school classes and those who are interested owing to populations of rare animal and plant species. From some raised lookout points, rare bird species in particular may be observed.

=== Churches ===
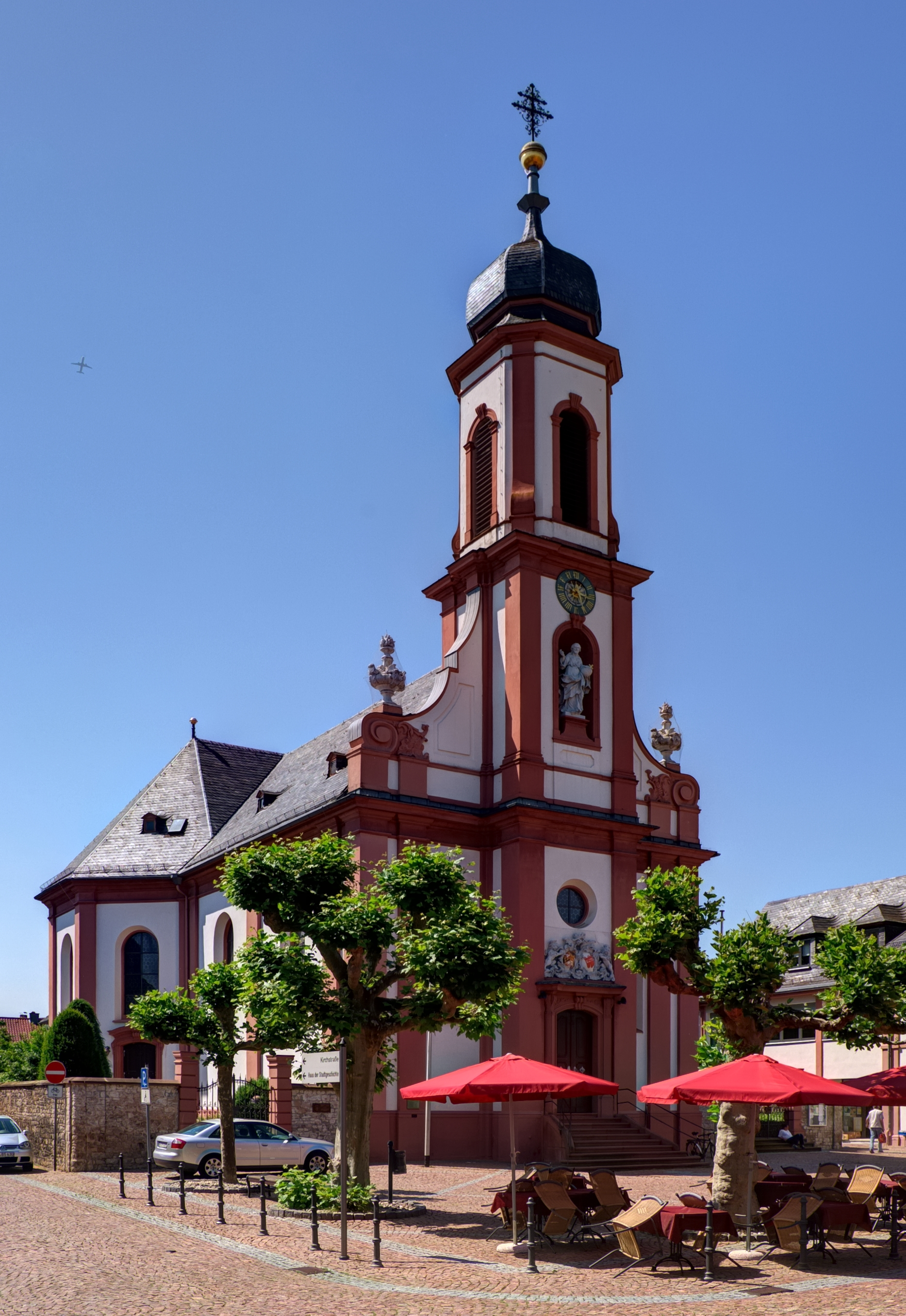

St. Cäcilia

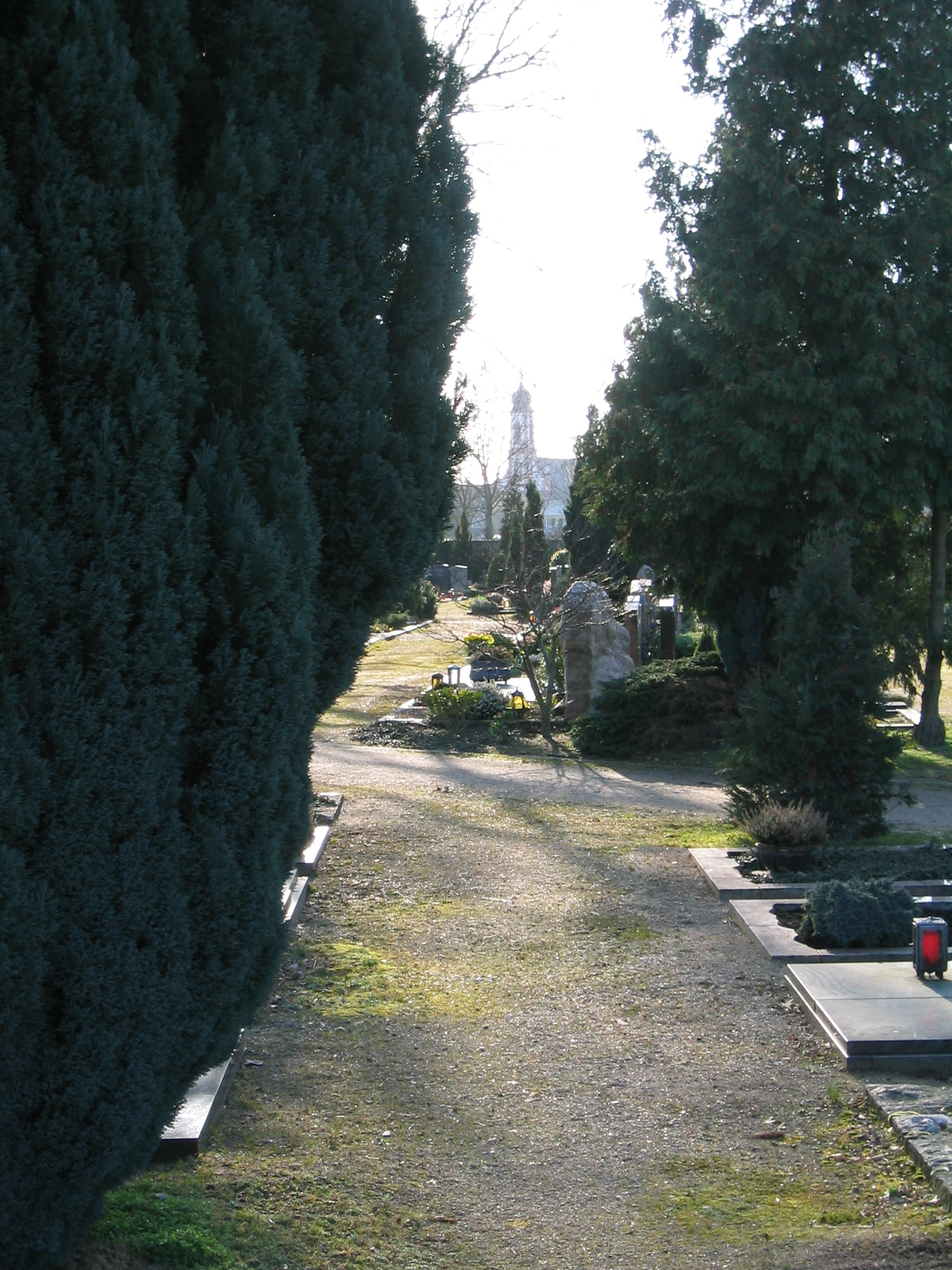

... from the graveyard

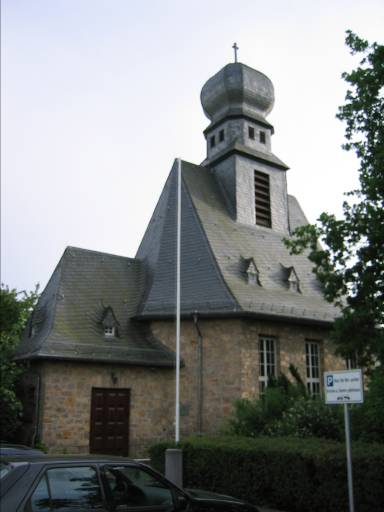

Gustav Adolf

The Catholic Saint Cecilia's Parish Church (Pfarrkirche St. Cäcilia) was built in 1739 by well-known Baroque architect Johann Balthasar Neumann by appointment from Countess Maria Theresia von Schönborn, and it was given its ceiling frescoes in 1741 by Christoph Thomas Scheffler. The sculptor Johann Wolfgang von der Auwera created the high altar. The Electoral Mainz court carpenter Franz Anton Herrmann made the pulpit, the choir stalls, the Communion bench, sacristy table and tabernacle table.

The likewise Catholic Parish Church Maria Himmelskron was built in 1956. The Protestant Gustav Adolf Kirche with its onion dome and steep roof was completed in 1923 with Swedish and American support. Owing to the hyperinflation of the day, the project's total cost amounted to 73,004,221,367,662 Marks and 17 Pfennigs.

== Infrastructure ==
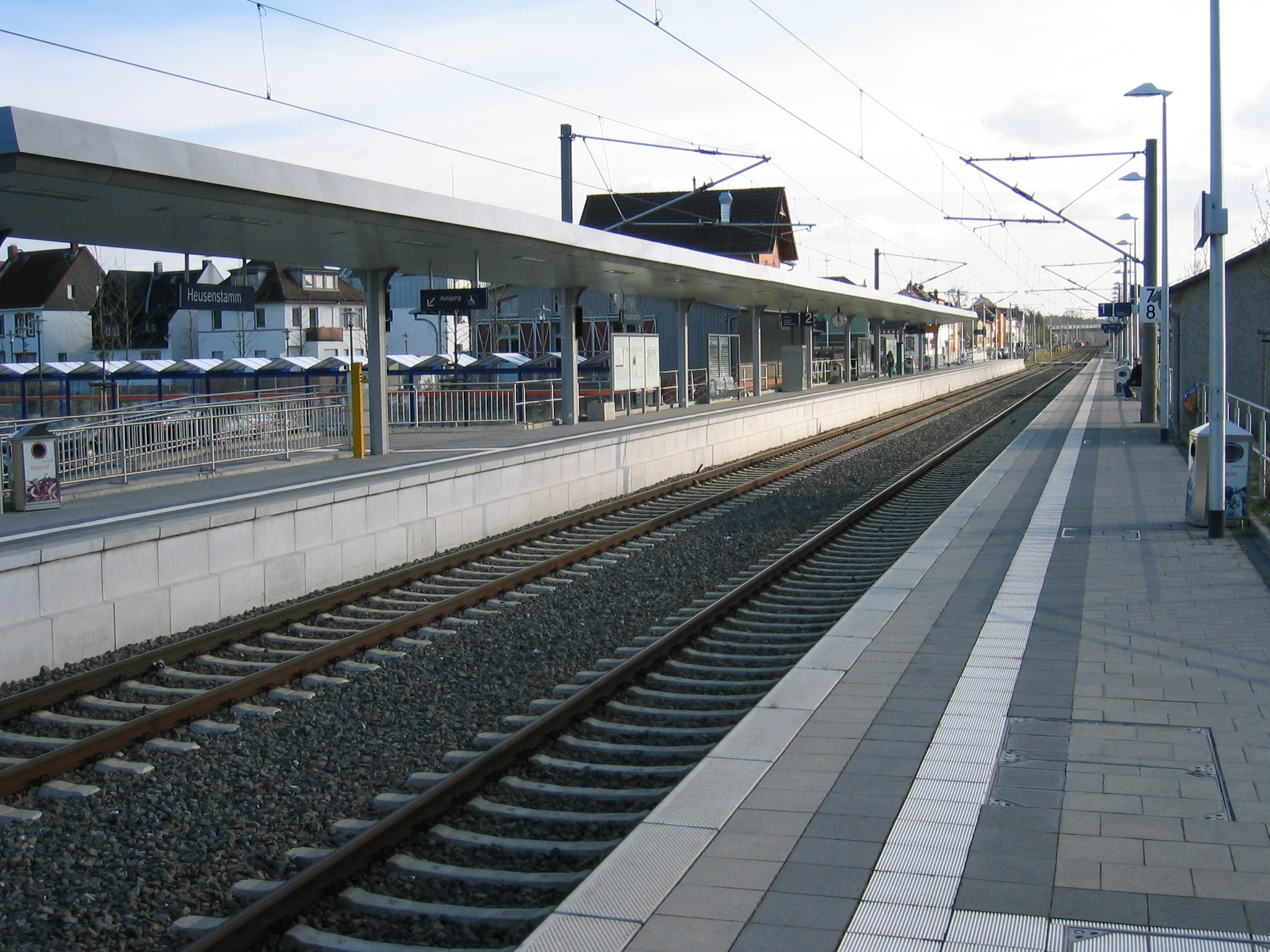

Heusenstamm ...

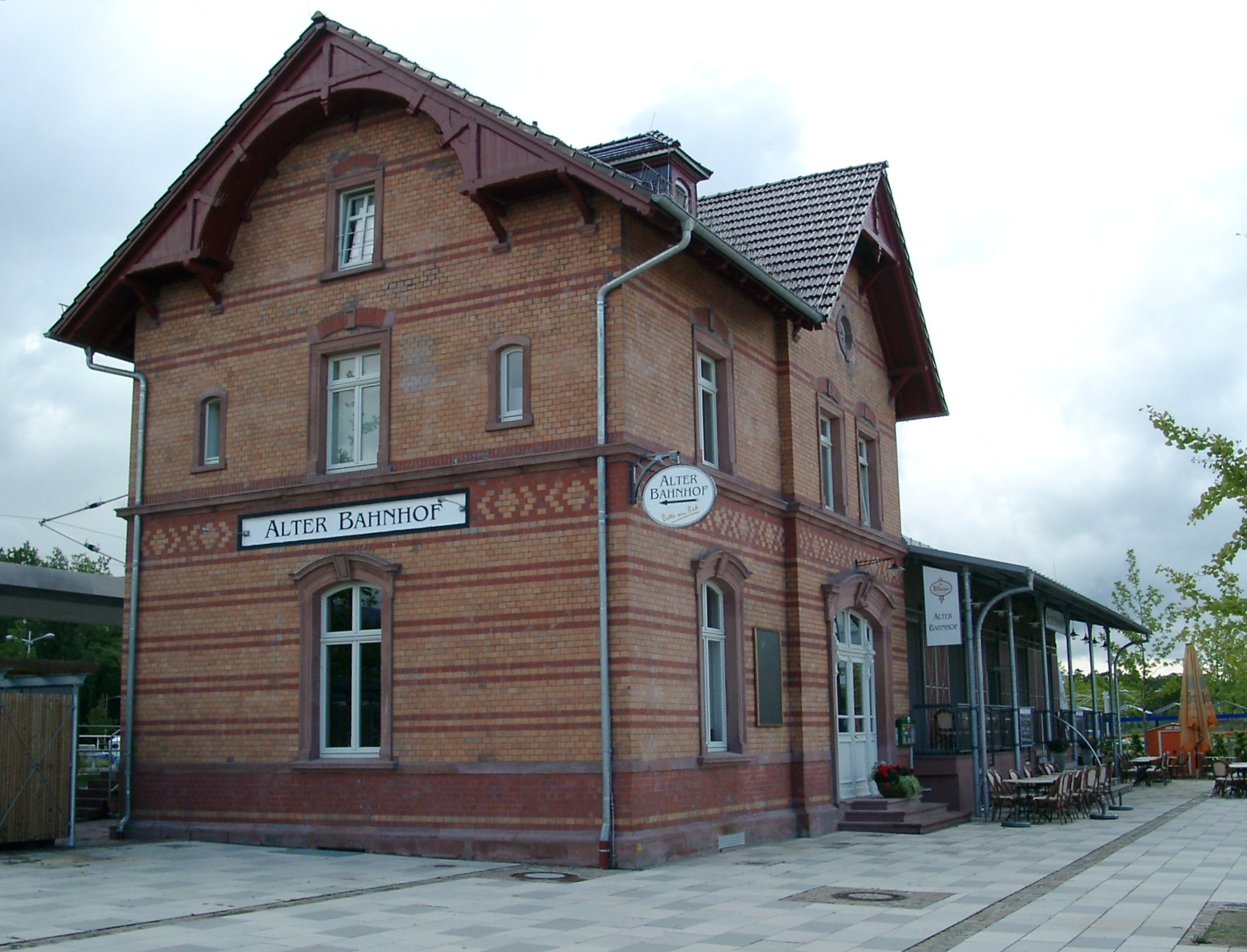

... Railway Station

=== Transport ===
Heusenstamm lies on the A 3, which is to be reached through the Obertshausen interchange, putting Frankfurt Airport, by way of the Frankfurter Kreuz only a short drive away. Not far away is also the A 661 with its Neu-Isenburg interchange.

Heusenstamm station, lying on the Offenbach-Bieber–Dietzenbach railway, a branch of the Rodgaubahn (Rodgau Railway), has since late 2003 been linked by line S2 (Niedernhausen-Dietzenbach) to the Rhine-Main S-Bahn network. The building work around the railway station (bus station, inn at the old station, railway station square) was completed in 2006. The S-Bahn runs to Offenbach's and Frankfurt's city centres and the Frankfurt Main Railway Station. On weekdays trains are half-hourly (quarter-hourly during rush-hours), and have since late 2006 been run with modern DBAG Class 423 rolling stock.

In the town itself and into neighbouring places run various buslines, among others route OF-30 to the outlying centre of Rembrücken. At night and on the weekends from Saturday afternoon, a share taxi takes over public transport within town, including Rembrücken.

== Education ==
=== Kindergartens ===
In Heusenstamm there are four church (3 Catholic, 1 Evangelical) kindergartens and three further ones in municipal sponsorship. Moreover, there are two daycare associations.

=== Schools ===
Heusenstamm is an important school location in Offenbach district. Currently there are three primary schools, the Adalbert-Stifter-Schule, the Otto-Hahn-Schule and the Matthias-Claudius-Schule. Secondary schools are the Adolf-Reichwein-Schule (Hauptschule and Realschule, ARS for short) and the Adolf-Reichwein-Gymnasium (ARG). In 2004, the Schule am Goldberg was opened, a special school for pupils with intellectual handicaps but who are trainable, with a section for those who also have physical handicaps. Adult education is handled by the Volkshochschule Heusenstamm.

== Media ==
The Offenbach-Post, whose publishing house has its seat in Offenbach am Main, reports regularly in its regional section about Heusenstamm. From the same publishing house also comes the Stadt-Post Heusenstamm.

== Notable people ==
- Jakob Sengler, (1799 - 1878), philosophy and Catholic theologian
- Willi Jaschek, repeat German champion in artistic gymnastics and Olympian (1964, 1968 "Hero of Mexico")
- Rene Frank, composer and specialized book author

=== Honorary citizens ===
- 1961: Wilhelm Arnoul, government president
- 1966: Franz Rau, clergyman
- 1971: Rudolf Braas, entrepreneur
- 1976: Hans Eckstein
- 1977: Hans Hemberger, mayor
- 1984: Franz Rebell, first town councillor
- 1984: Johann Subtil, mayor of Rembrücken
- 1986: Richard Hofmeister, clergyman
- 1987: Günter Wilkens, clergyman
- 2002: Helmut Kilian, 50 years on town council
- 2003: Josef Eckstein, mayor
- 2007: Prof. Thomas Engel, entrepreneur
