= Mauritius II of Trier =

5th-century bishop

Mauritius of Trier
- Born: 398

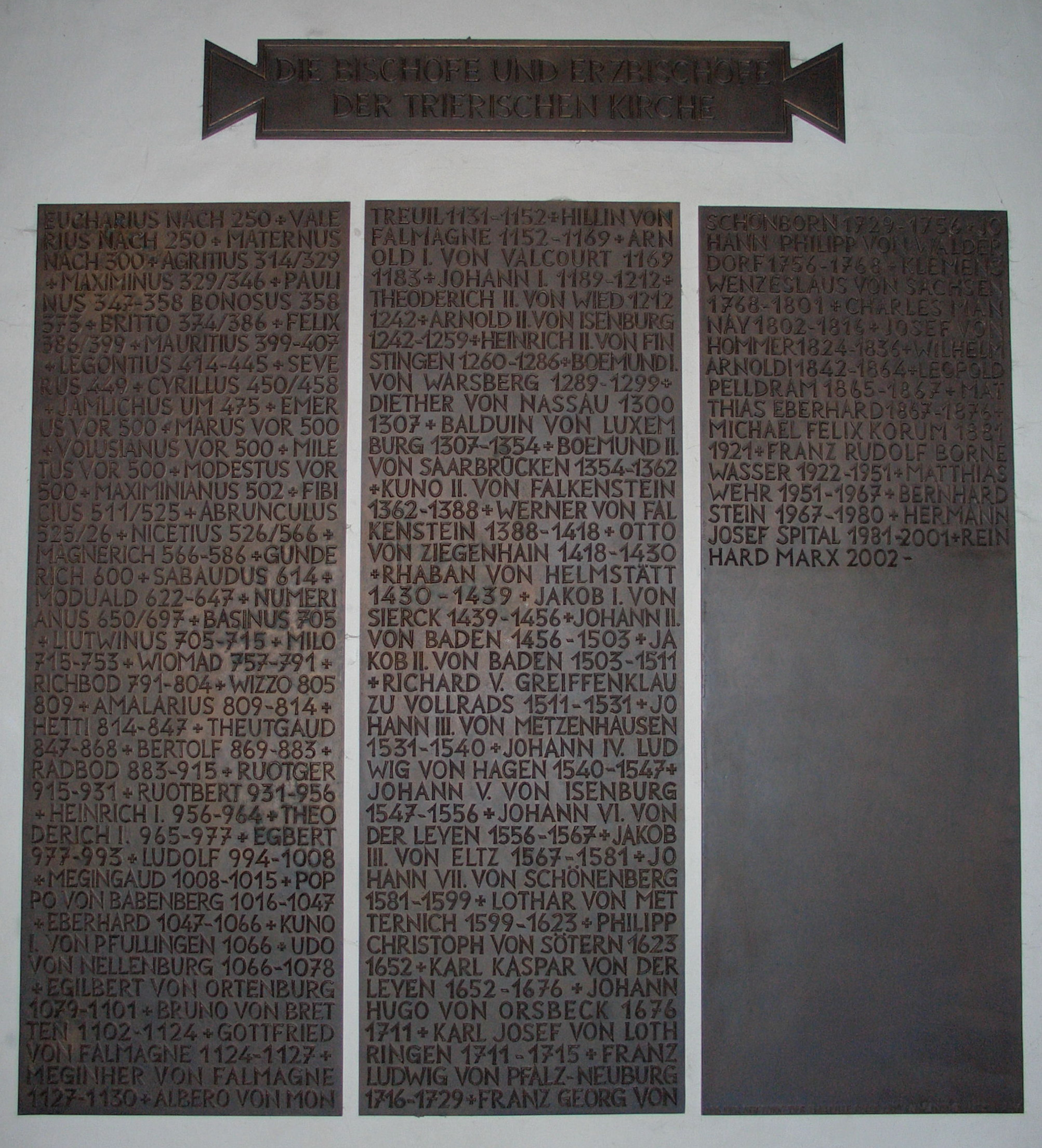
Tabula Episcoporum Trevirensium

Mauricius or Mauritius of Trier (fl. c. 398–407 or after 419) was bishop of Trier from 398/399 to at least 407, and possibly as late as 419.

Virtually nothing is known about the life of Bishop Mauricius. Following the resignation of Bishop Felix, he was elected bishop in 398/399. His episcopate coincided with a time of political upheaval. At the end of the 4th century the Roman city of Augusta Treverorum (today known as Trier) ceased to be a residence of the emperor and from 410 the area was invaded by the Germans. The significance of the church in Trier paled against this background, but it doubtless retained a local importance.

Mauricius is held to be the recipient of a letter from Pope Boniface I concerning the church in Arles.

It is unclear for how long Mauricius remained bishop: his successor may have been appointed in 407, or he may have been still in post in 419.

Titles of the Great Christian Church
Preceded by Felix	Bishop of Trier; 398–407	Succeeded by Leontius
