= Adolf-Reichwein-Gymnasium =

Coordinates: 50.054702°N 8.785707°E

- Adolf-Reichwein-Gymnasium
- Heusenstamm, Germany

Information
- School type: Gymnasium
- Founded: 1966
- Grades: 5 to 13, currently no year 13
- Gender: Co-Educational
- Enrolment: 1150
- Language: German
- Website: http://arg-heusenstamm.de

The Adolf-Reichwein-Gymnasium, or ARG, is a coeducational gymnasium in Heusenstamm, Germany, established in 1966. It has about 1400 pupils from ages 10 to 19.

== History ==
The Adolf-Reichwein-Gymnasium opened on 1 December 1966 at the beginning of a shortened school year, which changed its start date from Easter to the Summer.

In 1970, the school building was completed, so that provisional accommodation was no longer used.

In 1973, the school began student exchanges with the Judd School, later also with Tonbridge Grammar School.

== Curriculum ==
=== Languages ===
Five languages are taught at ARG. German is a compulsory native language, whilst English, French, Spanish and Latin as foreign languages. Students must take English, and one other foreign language.

=== Religious Education ===
Students may choose between Catholic and Protestant religious education. Worship takes place at the nearby Maria Himmelskron church after each holiday.

=== Other subjects ===
The school also offers:

- Art
- Biology (Y5+)
- Chemistry (Y8+)
- Geography
- Music
- Physics (Y7+)
- Theatre (Y11+)

=== Extracurricular activities ===
The school offers a variety of clubs and societies, including musical bands and orchestras.

== Campus ==
The ARG-Campus has a gym and four teaching buildings.
