= Blandine Merten =

German Roman Catholic nun

Blessed Blandine Merten
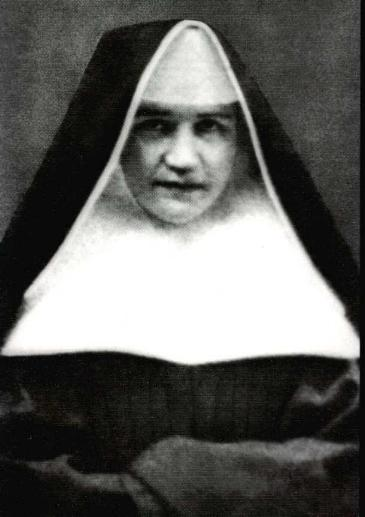
- Sister Blandine of the Sacred Heart
- Born: Maria Magdalena Merten; 10 July 1883; Düppenweiler, Saarland, German Empire
- Died: 18 May 1918 (aged 34); Trier, German Empire
- Venerated in: Roman Catholic Church
- Beatified: 1 November 1987, Saint Peter's Square by Pope John Paul II
- Feast: 18 May

Blandine Merten (religious name; born Maria Magdalena Merten; 10 July 1883 – 18 May 1918) was a German Ursulines. Merten worked as a teacher in a secular environment from 1902 to 1908. After taking her first vows, she continued teaching until 1916, when ill health forced her to retire. Pope John Paul II beatified her on 1 November 1987.

== Life ==
Maria Magdalena Merten was born to farmers as the ninth of eleven children. She taught children in a secular environment between 1902 and 1908. In November 1908, she and her sister decided to enter a convent of the Ursulines near Ahrweiler. Merten began her novitiate in 1910 and took the religious name Blandine of the Sacred Heart. She made her solemn vows on 4 November 1913.

Merten lived a simple life, focusing on caring for the children entrusted to her. She combined action and contemplation with a strong devotion to the Eucharist. In September 1916, she contracted tuberculosis, which forced her to stop teaching. Merten died in mid-1918 at the convent of Saint Bantus due to tuberculosis and was buried at Basilica of St Paulinus in Trier. Her relics were transferred on 18 May 1990.

== Beatification ==
The beatification process opened in Trier with an informative process on 13 November 1954, concluding on 9 June 1962. Her writings later received approval on 21 December 1968, and the formal introduction of the cause occurred on 4 December 1980, at which time she was titled a Servant of God. Theologians later approved the positio of the cause on 26 January 1983, and the Congregation for the Causes of Saints also approved it on 12 April 1983.

Pope John Paul II declared her venerable on 9 July 1983. The miracle required for beatification was investigated from 7 March 1985 to 30 March 1985 and validated in Rome in 1985. On 25 June 1986, a medical board approved the healing as a miracle, as did theologians on 19 December 1986, and the Congregation on 17 March 1987. John Paul II approved it on 8 May 1987, and beatified Sr. Blandine in Saint Peter's Square on 1 November 1987.
