= Christoph Thomas Scheffler =

German painter

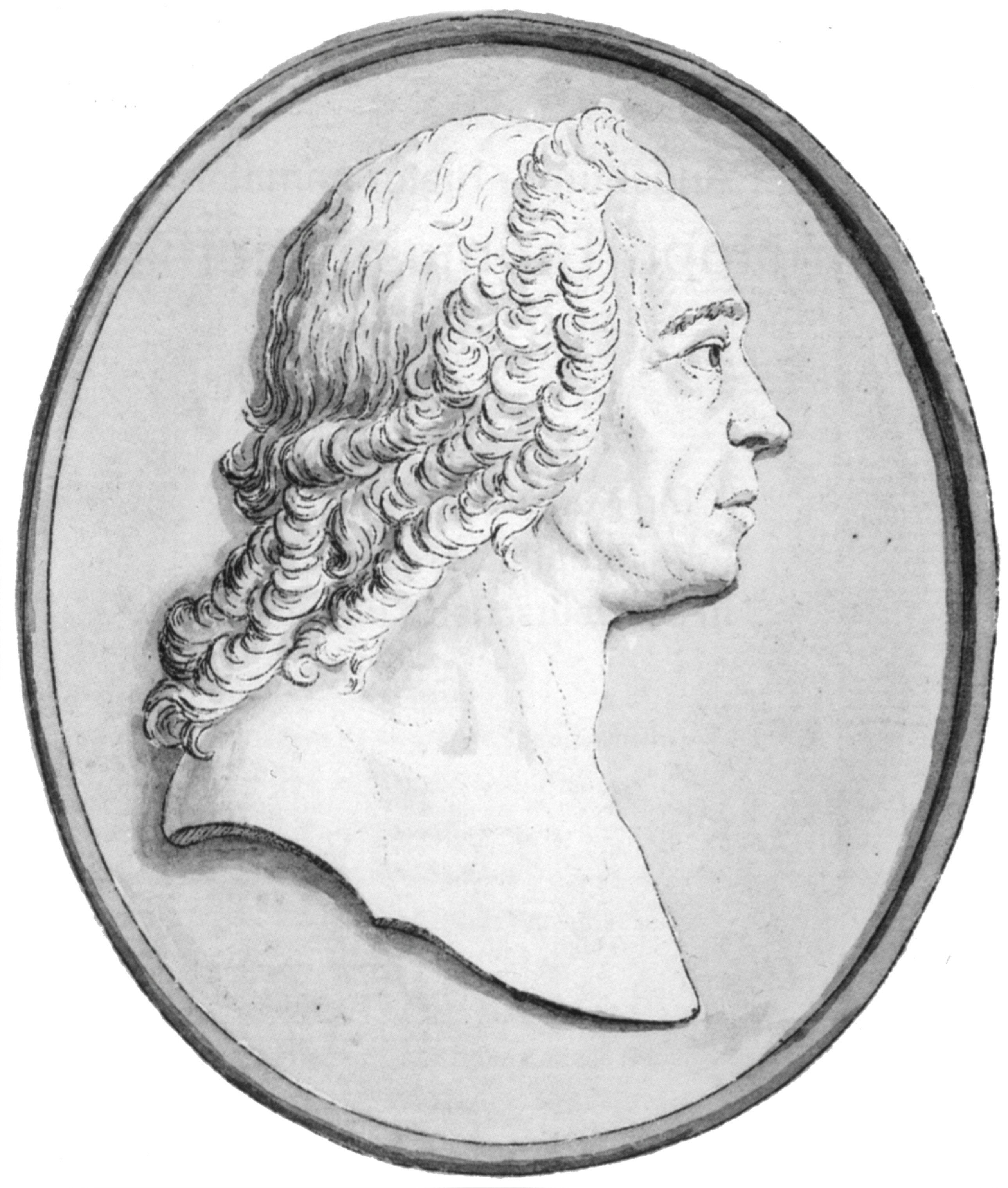
Christoph Thomas Scheffler

Christoph Thomas Scheffler (sometimes written Schäffler, December 20, 1699 – January 25, 1756) was a German painter of the rococo period. He is best known for his frescoes.

Scheffler was born in Mainburg and learned the trade of a painter from his father Wolfgang Scheffler. Between 1719 and 1722, he worked as a journeyman for Cosmas Damian Asam. In 1722, he joined the Jesuit Order as a lay brother and painted several churches for the order. After he had left the order in 1728, he settled in Augsburg, where he died in 1756.

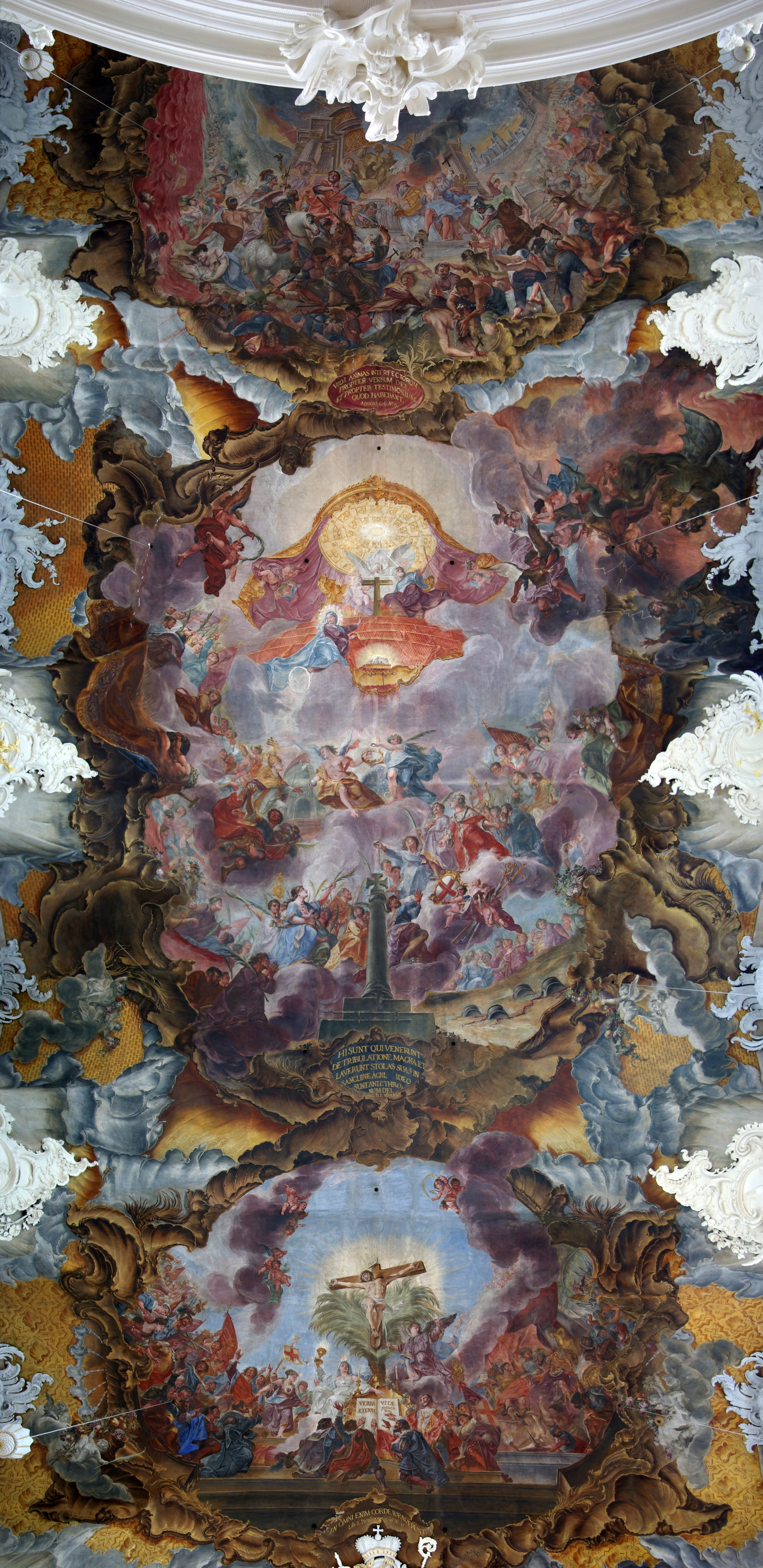
Frescoes of Christoph Thomas Scheffler in St. Paulinus church in Trier

Among his works are the frescoes of the St. Cäcilia church in Heusenstamm, which was built by Balthasar Neumann for the Schönborn-Heusenstamm family, and those of the St. Paulinus' Church in Trier, funded by Elector Franz Georg von Schönborn. The frescoes in the chapel of the Deutschhaus in Mainz, painted by Scheffler, were destroyed during World War II.

== Sources ==
- Braun, Wilhelm (1939). Cristoph Thomas Scheffler: ein Asamschüler. Stuttgart: Metzlersche Verlagsbuchhandlung. OCLC 920698548.
- Honour, Hugh (1975). The European vision of America : a special exhibition to honor the Bicentennial of the United States, organized by the Cleveland Museum of Art with the collaboration of the National Gallery of Art, Washington, and the Reunion des musees nationaux, Paris. Cleveland : Cleveland Museum of Art; Kent, Ohio : Distributed by Kent State University Press. ISBN 978-0-910386-26-5.
- Martini, Heiner (1995). "Scheffler, Christoph Thomas". In Bautz, Traugott (ed.). Biographisch-Bibliographisches Kirchenlexikon (BBKL) (in German). Vol. 9. Herzberg: Bautz. cols. 37–39. ISBN 3-88309-058-1. archived link
- Paula, Georg (2005). "Christoph Thomas Scheffler". Neue Deutsche Biographie (in German). Vol. 22. Berlin: Duncker & Humblot. pp. 613–614. (full text online).
