= Bonosus of Trier =

German Catholic bishop and saint

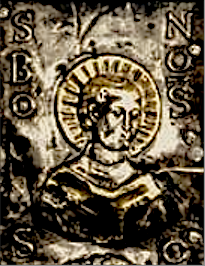
Bonosus of Trier

Bonosus of Trier (fl. c. 353–373) was bishop of Trier.

After the exile in 353 of Bishop Paulinus of Trier to Phrygia an episcopal election was held in which Bonosus was elected bishop of Trier: he refused however to take up the post, perhaps because he was convinced that Paulinus was still the rightful bishop of Trier and therefore could not be replaced. The Emperor, Constantius II, was so angry that he let Bonosus be put in jail. Only after the death of Paulinus in 358 (or possibly in 361, after the death of the Emperor) did Bonosus take office as bishop. He was also involved in the fight against Arianism.

His tomb was located temporarily in St. Symphorian's Abbey in Trier but is now in St. Paulinus' Church.

In the diocese of Trier Bonosus is revered as a saint with a feast day on 17 February.

Titles of the Great Christian Church
Preceded by Maximin	Bishop of Trier; 335–346	Succeeded by Veteranius
