= Priscillian =

Roman bishop

Priscillian (in Latin: Priscillianus; Gallaecia, c. 340 – Augusta Treverorum, Gallia Belgica, c. 385) was a wealthy nobleman of Roman Hispania who promoted a strict form of Christian asceticism. He became bishop of Ávila in 380. Certain practices of his followers (such as meeting at country villas instead of attending church) were denounced at the Council of Zaragoza in 380. Tensions between Priscillian and bishops opposed to his views continued, as well as political maneuvering by both sides. Around 385, Priscillian was charged with sorcery and executed by authority of the Emperor Maximus. The ascetic movement Priscillianism is named after him, and continued in Hispania and Gaul until the late 6th century. Tractates by Priscillian and close followers, which were thought lost, were discovered in 1885 and published in 1889.

== Sources ==
The principal and almost contemporary source for the career of Priscillian is the Gallic chronicler Sulpicius Severus, who characterized him (Chronica II.46) as noble and rich, a layman who had devoted his life to study, and was vain of his classical pagan education.

== Life ==
Priscillian was born around 340, into the nobility, possibly in northwestern Hispania (Gallaecia), and was well-educated. About 370, he initiated a movement in favour of asceticism. Priscillian advocated studying not only the Bible, but also apocryphal books. His followers, who were won over by his eloquence and his severely ascetic example, included the bishops Instantius and Salvianus.

== Beliefs ==
According to Priscillian, apostles, prophets, and "doctors" (in the Latin sense of "teachers") are the divinely appointed orders of the Church, preeminence being due the doctors, among whom Priscillian reckoned himself. The "spiritual" comprehend and judge all things, being "children of wisdom and light"; and the distinction between flesh and spirit, darkness and light, Moses and Christ, and the "prince of this world" and Christ, are emphasised. In asceticism, Priscillian distinguished three degrees, though he did not deny hope of pardon to those who were unable to attain full perfection. The perfect in body, mind, and spirit were celibate, or, if married, continent. Certain practices of the Priscillianists are known through the condemnatory canons issued by the 380 synod, such as receiving the Eucharist in the church but eating it at home or in the conventicle; women joining with men during the time of prayer; fasting even on Sunday; and meditating at home or in the mountains instead of attending church during Lent.

According to historian Ana Maria Castelo Martins Jorge, "He played the role of a catalyst among Lusitanian Christians and crystallized a variety of ascetic, monastic and intellectual aspirations that were either fairly, or even entirely, incompatible with Christianity as it was lived by the great majority of the bishops of the day."

== Opposition ==
His notable opponents in Hispania were Hyginus, bishop of Corduba, and Hydatius, bishop of Augusta Emerita. They accused Priscillian's teachings of being gnostic in nature. Through his intolerance of and severity toward Priscillian, Hydatius promoted rather than prevented the spread of his sect. Hydatius convened a synod held at Caesaraugusta in 380. Ten bishops were present at this synod from Spain, and two from Aquitaine: Delphinus of Bordeaux, and Phœbadus of Agen. Although neither Priscillian nor any of his followers attended, he wrote in reply his third tract justifying the reading of apocryphal literature, without denying that their contents were partly spurious.

Neither Priscillian nor any of his disciples are mentioned in the decrees. The synod forbade certain practices. It forbade assumption of the title of "doctor", and forbade clerics from becoming monks on the motivation of a more perfect life; women were not to be given the title of "virgins" until they had reached the age of forty. Michael Kulikowski characterizes the concern at Zaragoza as the relationship between town and country, and the authority of the urban episcopacy over religious practice in outlying rural areas.

In the immediate aftermath of the synod, Priscillian was elected bishop of Abila or Abela, and was consecrated by Instantius and Salvianus. Priscillian was now a suffragan of Ithacius of Ossonoba, the metropolitan bishop of Lusitania, whom he attempted to oust, but who then obtained from the emperor Gratian an edict against "false bishops and Manichees". This was a threat against the Priscillianists, since the Roman Empire had banned Manichaeism long before it legalized Christianity. Consequently, the three bishops, Instantius, Salvianus and Priscillian, went in person to Rome, to present their case before Pope Damasus I, himself a native of Hispania. Neither the Pope nor Ambrose, bishop of Mediolanum, where the emperor resided, granted them an audience. Salvianus died in Rome, but through the intervention of Macedonius, the imperial magister officiorum and an enemy of Ambrose, they succeeded in procuring the withdrawal of Gratian's edict, and an order for the arrest of Ithacius. Instantius and Priscillian, returning to Spain, regained their sees and churches.

A sudden change occurred in 383, when the governor of Britain, Magnus Maximus, rebelled against Gratian, who marched against him but was assassinated. Maximus was recognized as emperor of Britain, Gaul and Spain, and made Augusta Treverorum, in Gallia Belgica, his residence.

There Ithacius presented his case against Priscillian, and Maximus ordered a synod convened at Burdigala in 384. After this, the matter was transferred to the secular court at Augusta Treverorum. Ithacius and Hydatius of Mérida both went there for the trial. Sulpicius Severus notes that Martin of Tours protested to the Emperor against the ruling, which said that the accused who went to Treves should be imprisoned. Maximus, a Spaniard by birth, treated the matter not as one of ecclesiastical rivalry but as one of morality and society. He is also said to have wished to enrich his treasury by confiscation of the property of the condemned.

At Augusta Treverorum, Priscillian was tried by a secular court on criminal charges that included sorcery, a capital offence. Priscillian was questioned and forced to make the confession that he studied obscene doctrines, held nocturnal meetings with shameful women, and prayed while naked. Consequently, he was charged with practicing magic (maleficium), for which he was convicted and sentenced to death. Ithacius was his chief accuser. Priscillian was condemned and, with five of his companions, executed by the sword in 385. Priscillian's execution is seen as the first example of secular justice intervening in an ecclesiastical matter and the first Christian killed by other Christians for heresy.

== Reactions to the execution ==
Pope Siricius, Ambrose of Milan, and Martin of Tours protested against the execution, largely on the jurisdictional grounds that an ecclesiastical case should not be decided by a civil tribunal, and worked to reduce the persecution. Pope Siricius censured not only Ithacius but the emperor himself. On receiving information from Maximus, he excommunicated Ithacius and his associates. On an official visit to Augusta Treverorum, Ambrose refused to give any recognition to Ithacius, "not wishing to have anything to do with bishops who had sent heretics to their death".

Before the trial, Martin had obtained from Maximus a promise not to apply a death penalty. After the execution, Martin broke off relations with Felix, bishop of Augusta Treverorum, and all others associated with the enquiries and the trial, and restored communion only when the emperor promised to stop the persecution of the Priscillianists. Maximus was killed in his attempted invasion of Italy in 388. Under the new ruler, Ithacius and Hydatius were deposed and exiled. The remains of Priscillian were brought from Augusta Treverorum to Spain, where he was honoured as a martyr, especially in the west of the country, where Priscillianism did not die out until the second half of the 6th century.

== Continued Priscillianism ==
The heresy, notwithstanding the severe measures taken against it, continued to spread in Gaul as well as in Hispania. A letter dated 20 February 405, from Pope Innocent I to Exuperius, bishop of Tolosa, opposed the Priscillianists’ interpretation of the Apocrypha.

In 412, Lazarus, bishop of Aix-en-Provence, and Herod, bishop of Arelate, were expelled from their sees on a charge of Manichaeism. Proculus, the metropolitan of Massilia, and the metropolitans of Vienna and Gallia Narbonensis Secunda were also followers of the rigorist tradition of Priscillian. Something was done for its repression by a synod held by Turibius of Asturica in 446, and by that of Toletum in 447; as an openly professed creed it had to be declared heretical once more by the second synod of Bracara Augusta in 563, a sign that Priscillianist asceticism was still strong long after his execution. "The official church," says F. C. Conybeare, "had to respect the ascetic spirit to the extent of enjoining celibacy upon its priests, and of recognizing, or rather immuring, such of the laity as desired to live out the old ascetic ideal."

It is not always easy to separate the genuine assertions of Priscillian himself from those ascribed to him by his enemies, nor from the later developments taken by groups who were labelled Priscillianist. The long prevalent estimation of Priscillian as a heretic and Manichaean rested upon Augustine, Turibius of Astorga, Pope Leo I, the Great, and Orosius (who quotes a fragment of a letter of Priscillian's), although at the Council of Toledo in 400, fifteen years after Priscillian's death, when his case was reviewed, the most serious charge that could be brought was the error of language involved in a misrendering of the word innascibilis ("unbegettable"). Augustine criticized the Priscillianists, who he said were like the Manicheans in their habit of fasting on Sundays.

Priscillianism continued in the north of Hispania and the south of Gaul. Priscillian was honored as a martyr, especially in Gallaecia (modern Galicia and northern Portugal), where his headless body was reverentially returned from Augusta Treverorum and allegedly became rediscovered and revered in the 9th century as Saint James the Great.

== Writings and rediscovery ==
Some writings by Priscillian were accounted orthodox and were not burned. For instance he divided the Pauline epistles (including the Epistle to the Hebrews) into a series of texts on their theological points and wrote an introduction to each section. These canons survived in a form edited by Peregrinus. They contain a strong call to a life of personal piety and asceticism, including celibacy and abstinence from meat and wine. The charismatic gifts of all believers are equally affirmed. Study of scripture is urged. Priscillian placed considerable weight on apocryphal books, not as being inspired but as helpful in discerning truth and error. It was long thought that all his writings had perished, but in 1885, Georg Schepss discovered at the University of Würzburg eleven genuine tracts, published in the CSEL in 1886.Though they bear Priscillian's name, four describing Priscillian's trial appear to have been written by a close follower.

According to Raymond E. Brown (1995), the source of the Comma Johanneum, a later insertion into the First Epistle of John, known since the fourth century, appears to be the Latin Liber Apologeticus by Priscillian.

The modern assessment of Priscillian is summed up by Henry Chadwick (1976).
