= Paulinus of Trier =

German Catholic bishop and saint

Saint Paulinus of Trier
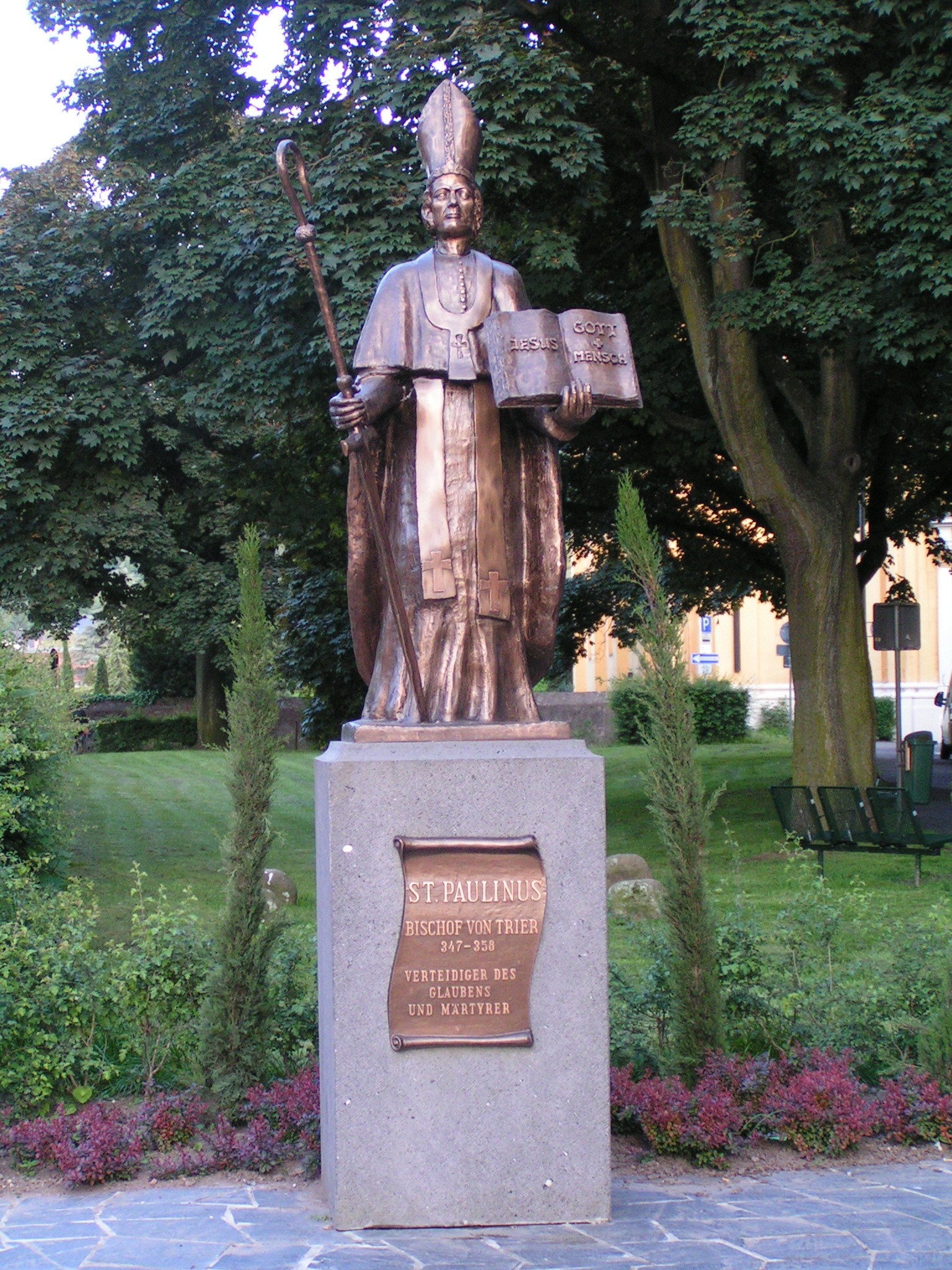
- Monument to Saint Paulinus

Bishop of Augusta Treverorum (Trier)
- Born: Gascony, France
- Died: 358; Phrygia, in modern Turkey
- Venerated in: Eastern Orthodox Church; Roman Catholic Church
- Feast: 31 August

Saint Paulinus of Trier (died 358) was bishop of Trier and a supporter of St. Athanasius the Great in the conflict against Arianism. At the Synod of Arles (353) he was targeted by the Arians, and was exiled to Phrygia, being effectively singled out by the Emperor Constantius II. He died in exile five years later, but his remains were returned to Trier in 395. His tomb is in the crypt of the city's St. Paulinus' Church, which was rededicated to him.

Paulinus was from Gascony and educated in the cathedral school at Poitiers. He travelled to Germany with Maximin of Trier, whom he succeeded as bishop.

== Veneration ==
He is a saint venerated by the Eastern Orthodox Church and Roman Catholic Church. His feast day is on 31 August.

Titles of the Great Christian Church
Preceded by Maximin	Bishop of Trier; 335–346	Succeeded by Bonosus
