= Basilica of St. Paulinus, Trier =

- Saint Paulinus
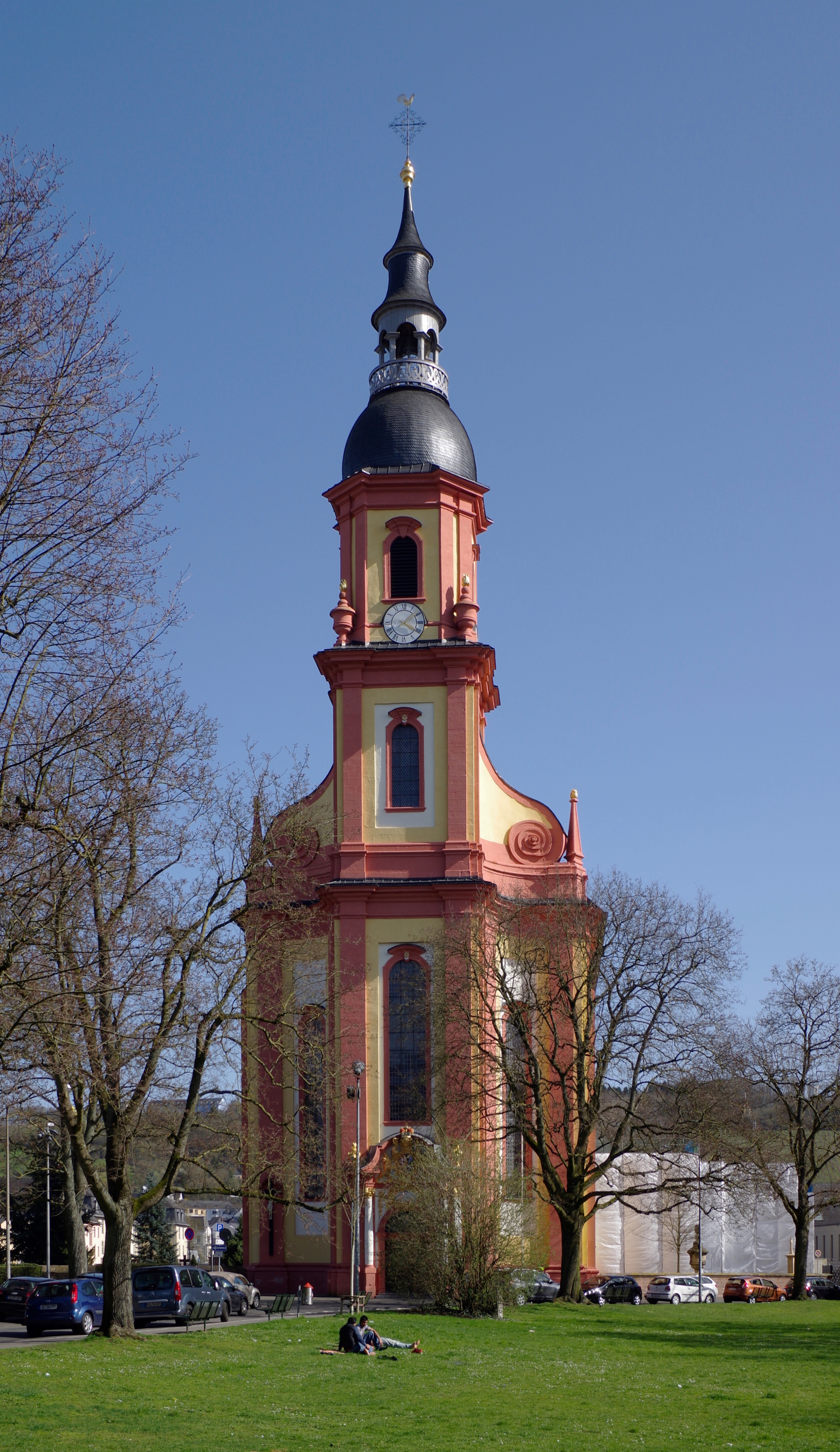
- Basilica of St. Paulinus, Trier
- 49°45′45″N 6°39′8″E
- Location: Trier
- Country: Germany
- Denomination: Roman Catholic

History
- Status: Basilica (minor)
- Founded: 4th century
- Dedication: Paulinus of Trier

Architecture
- Functional status: active
- Architect: Balthasar Neumann
- Style: Baroque
- Groundbreaking: 1734
- Completed: 1753

Saint Paulinus (German: St. Paulinskirche) is a Baroque church in the city of Trier, Germany. Constructed between 1734 and 1753, the interior was designed by Johann Balthasar Neumann. The ceiling of the nave features a painting by the artist Christoph Thomas Scheffler. The tomb of the saint after whom the church is named, Paulinus of Trier, is located in the church's crypt.

Based in Germany's oldest city with a significant Roman history, three church buildings have stood on the site since the 4th century.

== History ==
=== First church: 4th Century to 1039 ===
Anti-Arian Paulinus of Trier was a bishop of Trier before being exiled to Phrygia in 353. He died there five years later, but his remains were returned to Trier in 395. Felix of Trier, a bishop of the city who held the post from 386 to 398, initiated the erection of a crypt and church on the current site of Saint Paulinus' Church, near a cemetery and just outside the walls of the city. Felix originally dedicated the church (and associated monastery) to the Theban Legion, martyred, according to legend, near Agaunum (present-day Saint Maurice-en-Valais) for refusing to renounce their Christian beliefs. The alleged remains of up to twelve of these martyred soldiers were placed in the crypt by Felix of Trier. Paulinus of Trier's body was later interred here also, and the dedication of the church was transferred to the saint. Several centuries later, in 1039, a fire destroyed the building, but the crypt was spared damage.

=== Second church: c. 1148 to 1674 ===
Following the fire of the original, ancient church, a new building was constructed under Archbishop Bruno. Pope Eugene III consecrated the completed church in 1148. Smaller than the present building, the basilica featured a twin-tower façade with staircases either side, not unlike the balconies on the west face of the Cathedral of Trier, built for displaying relics to the public.

French troops besieged and occupied Trier in 1673. In order to make space for an encampment, soldiers blew up the church the following year.

=== Third church: 1734 to present ===
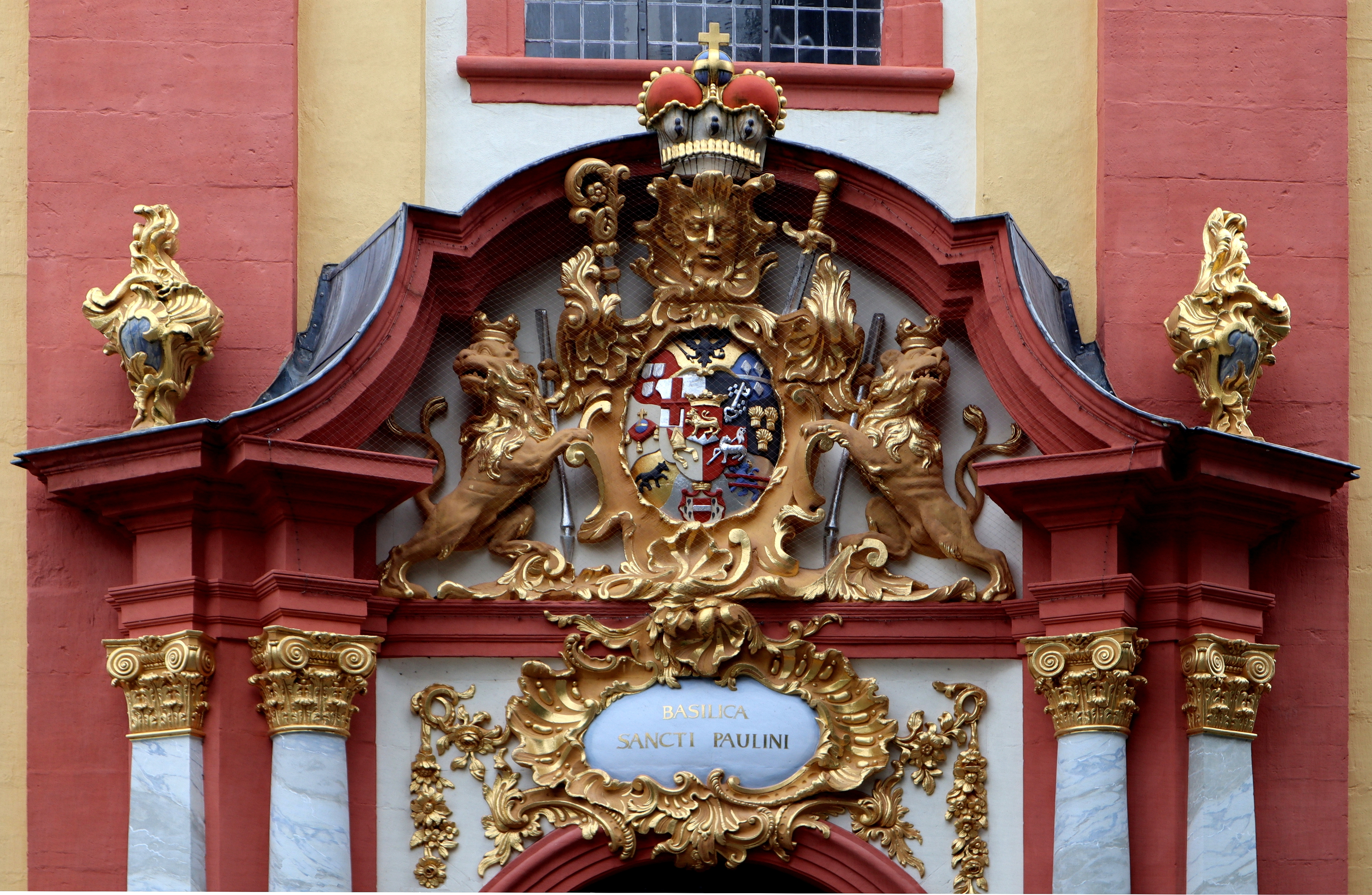
Coat of arms of Franz Georg von Schönborn at Basilica St. Paulinus

Sixty years after the destruction of the second church by French troops, Franz Georg von Schönborn-Buchheim, Archbishop of Trier, funded the erection of a new basilica. Designed as a single nave, probably by the architect Christian Kretzschmar, most of the internal elements were the work of Johann Balthasar Neumann, a significant Baroque architect responsible for several impressive buildings, such as the Würzburg Residence. Dates for the completion of the church are given as 1743 or 1753, but it was consecrated in 1757. The tower reaches a height of 53 metres, and the length of the building is 52 m.

Between 1802 and 1804, the monastery associated with the church was dissolved when assets were seized by the French, the church losing its collegial status and becoming a parish church instead. On 23 May 1958, Pope Pius XII awarded the church Basilica minor status.

== Features and functions ==
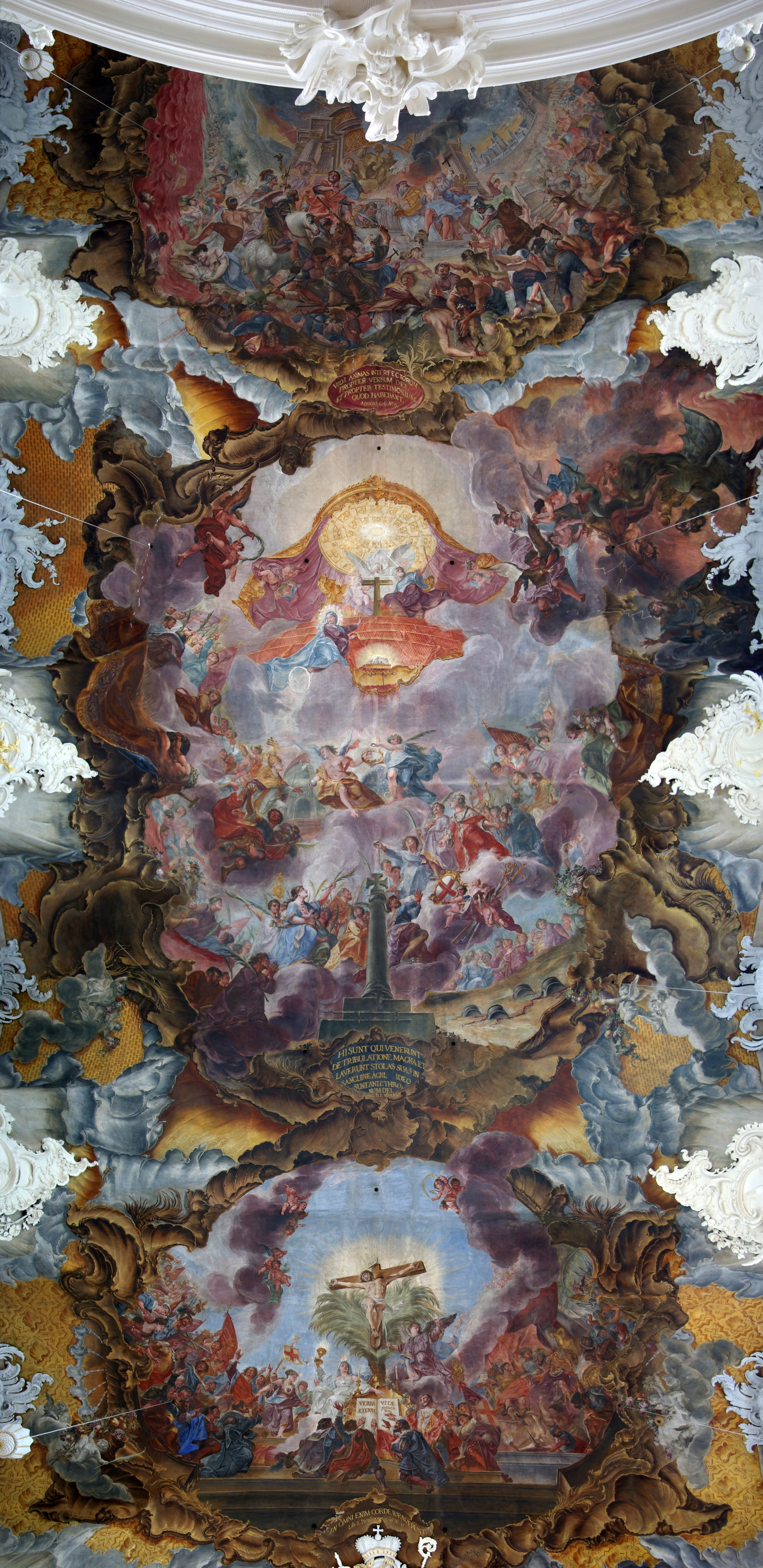
Painted ceiling by Christoph Thomas Scheffler

As well as being the architect of the building, Neumann contributed his Rococo architectural flair to several internal elements, including the stucco work, ornate altars, and ciborium. The sculptor Ferdinand Tietz carried out several of Neumann's plans, carving elements such as the statuary and choir stalls.

The ceiling of the nave features a large fresco painted by Christoph Thomas Scheffler, portraying scenes from the life of St Paulinus and depictions of the martyrdom of the Theban Legion.

Organ-builder Romanus Benedict Nollet worked on the organ between 1753 and 1756. Klais Orgelbau, an organ building and restoration company, restored and electrified the pipe organ before 1934, and renewed it in 1991.

The church's four bells were cast by the brothers Charles and Joseph Perrin between 1821 and 1822. As few European bells from the 19th century survived two world wars, the bells are considered historically important.

No.	Name	Cast year	Founder	Diameter (mm)	Weight (kg)	Nominal (16th)
1	Paulinus & Trierische martyrs	1821	Joseph & Charles Perrin	1570	2365	B^{0} −11
2	Nikolaus & Donatus	1821	Joseph & Charles Perrin	1420	1774	C#^{1} –9
3	Michael & Walburga	1821	Joseph & Charles Perrin	1273	1239	D^{1} −5
4	Petrus & Johannes Nepomuk	1822	Joseph & Charles Perrin	1168	1017	E^{1} −4

The church is active as a place of worship and is open for viewing by the public several days each week. It also hosts concerts, usually organ recitals. The martyrdom of the Theban Legion is commemorated each year in October by opening the crypt to visitors who wish to view the tombs of the Roman soldiers interred there. At other times of year, it is normally only possible to view a portion of the crypt through a metal grille.

The church still maintains a cemetery in its grounds, and in 1989 a chapel was erected near the grave of Blessed Blandine Merten, who died in Trier in 1918.
