= Hetto =

- Archbishop of Trier
- Native name: Hetti
- Church: Catholic Church
- Archdiocese: Archdiocese of Trier
- Diocese: Electorate of Trier
- In office: 814–847
- Predecessor: Amalarius
- Successor: Theotgaud

Personal details
- Born: before 800
- Died: 847
- Buried: St. Matthias' Abbey

Hetto (died 847) was the Archbishop of Trier from 814 until his death. In this capacity, he was both a political and ecclesiastical leader.

== Life ==
Louis the Pious confirmed to Hetto the privilege of immunity from the saecular courts. This had been previously granted to Bishop Wermad who served before Trier was made an archiepiscopal see.

In 829, Hetto was among a number of bishops who participated in the Synod of Mainz to hear the case of Gottschalk of Orbais, monk of the monastery of Fulda, against Rabanus Maurus, his abbot. Gottschalk's father had placed him at the abbey as a child oblate along with a gift of land. (The Tenth Council of Toledo of 656 forbade their acceptance before the age of ten and granted them free permission to leave the monastery, if they wished, when they reached the age of puberty.) Gottschalk maintained that the abbot subsequently compelled him to receive the tonsure and take the monastic vows. He sought his freedom and the return of his land, arguing that his oblation was invalid under Saxon law as there were no Saxon witnesses. Several of the bishops at the council held Saxon sees. The council held in favor of the monk.

In 831, Hetto was a co-consecrator of Ansgar as bishop for the northern missions. With the support of Louis, Hetto built the Church of Saint Castor just outside of Confluentes. In 836, he translated the relics of St. Castor from the Paulinuskirchen in Karden to the church.

In 846, Hetto gifted the hamlet of Scindalasheim to Abbot Marcuardus of Prüm Abbey. He was succeeded by his nephew Theotgaud.

== Works ==
- Epistolae,
- Interrogationes quas Hetti archiepiscopus suis proposuit auditoribus,

== Sources ==
Preceded by Amalhar	Archbishop of Trier; 814–847	Succeeded by Theotgaud
