= Volusianus (disambiguation) =

Volusianus was the Roman emperor from 251 to 253.

Volusianus or Volusian may also refer to:

- Gaius Ceionius Rufius Volusianus (c. 246 – c. 330), Roman senator
- Lucius Petronius Taurus Volusianus (d. c. 286), Roman senator
- Gaius Ceionius Rufius Volusianus Lampadius (fl. 365), Roman urban prefect
- Rufius Antonius Agrypnius Volusianus (d. 437), Roman aristocrat
- Volusianus of Trier, bishop at the end of the 5th century
- Volusian of Tours, bishop from 491 to 498
