= Heidenwerfen =

Anti-pagan custom in medieval Germany

Heidenwerfen (literally "heathen pelting") was an anti-pagan custom of medieval Germany that was encouraged by the Catholic Church. According to 13th century records from the town of Hildesheim a crown and mantle were placed on a wooden post that represented the Roman god Jupiter. The post was placed outside a church, stoned and burnt. Different iterations of this practice persisted until 1811, when worshippers at St. Matthias' Abbey would throw stones at a bust of the Roman goddess Venus Victrix. The clergy of the period borrowed these names from classical tradition which had reached northern Europe in the 11th century, after the reconquest of Spain.

== See also ==
- Stoning of the Devil
