= Franz Rudolf Bornewasser =

Catholic archbishop of Trier (1866–1951)

- (Arch)Bishop of Trier
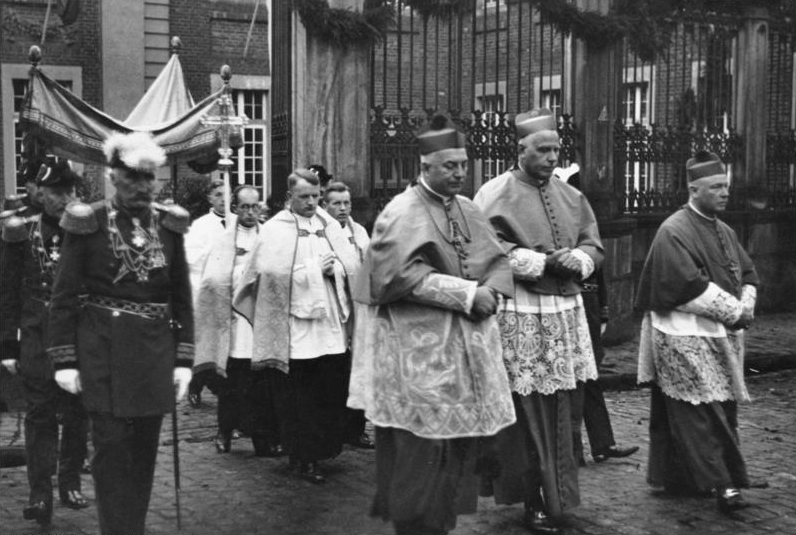
- The new Bishop of Münster Clemens August Graf von Galen with Cardinal Karl Joseph Schulte, Bishop Rudolf Bornewasser of Trier and Bishop Wilhelm Berning of Osnabrück in procession in 1933.
- Church: Catholic Church
- Diocese: Diocese of Trier
- In office: 12 March 1922 – 20 December 1951
- Predecessor: Michael Felix Korum
- Successor: Matthias Wehr
- Previous posts: Titular Bishop of Bida (1921-1922); Auxiliary Bishop of Cologne (1921-1922)

Orders
- Ordination: 10 March 1894
- Consecration: 29 May 1921 by Karl Joseph Schulte

Personal details
- Born: 12 March 1886 Radevormwald, Rhine Province, Kingdom of Prussia, German Confederation
- Died: 20 December 1951 (aged 65) Trier, Rhineland-Palatinate, West Germany
- Coat of arms: Franz Rudolf Bornewasser's coat of arms

Franz Rudolf Bornewasser (12 March 1866; Radevormwald – 20 December 1951; Trier) was a Roman Catholic Bishop of Trier, in Germany, during the Nazi era.

In 1941, the Bishop of Münster, Clemens August von Galen, publicly denounced the Nazi “euthanasia” program in a sermon, and telegrammed his text to Hitler. Franz Bornewasser also sent protests to Hitler, though not in public.

Documents prepared by the American OSS, and used in evidence at the Nuremberg Trials, record that the Nazis were cautious with regard to the murder of church leaders, and conscious of not wanting to create martyrs. Nevertheless, Catholic leaders frequently faced violence or the threat of violence, particularly at the hands of the SA, the SS or Hitler Youth. A number of cases were cited by the OSS, including two attacks against Bishop Bornewasser of Trier.

== See also ==
- Nazi persecution of the Catholic Church
- Catholic resistance to Nazism

Catholic Church titles
Preceded by Michael Felix Korum	Bishop of Trier; 1922-1951	Succeeded by Matthias Wehr
