= Egilbert =

Roman Catholic archbishop

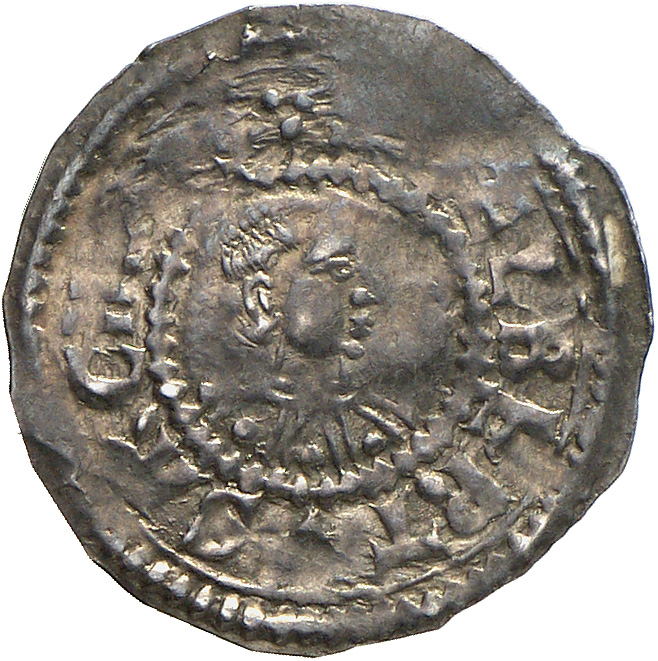
- Egilbert depicted on a denarius

Archbishop of Trier
- In office 1079–1101
- Preceded by: Udo of Nellenburg
- Succeeded by: Bruno

Personal details
- Died: 3 September 1101
- Resting place: Trier Cathedral
- Known for: Imperial support in the Investiture Controversy

Egilbert (or Engelbert) (died 3 September 1101), called of Rothenburg, was the Archbishop of Trier from 1079 until his death. He was a partisan of the Holy Roman Emperor Henry IV during the Investiture Controversy. He was rewarded in 1100 with the dignity of Archchancellor of Gaul.

Under his patronage, the foundation stone of the Maria Laach Abbey was laid in 1093 by the Count Palatine of the Rhine and Imperial Administrator, Henry II of Laach. Archbishop Egilbert sent the first monks from the Benedictine Imperial Abbey of St. Maximin in Trier to settle the emerging monastery.

During the persecution of Jews in 1096, Egilbert attempted to offer protection to Jews.

He was involved in a dispute with Henry, Duke of Lower Lorraine.

Catholic Church titles
Preceded by Udo of Nellenburg	Archbishop of Trier; 1079–1101	Succeeded by Bruno
