= Modestus (bishop of Trier) =

Clergyman (died 489)

Saint Modestus

Bishop of Trier
- Died: 489
- Venerated in: Catholic Church; Eastern Orthodox Church
- Canonized: Pre-Congregational Saint
- Major shrine: St Matthias Church, Trier, Germany
- Feast: 24 February

Modestus (died 489) was bishop of Trier when the Franks gained control over the city of Trier and he is considered a Pre-Congregational Saint. His feast day is 24 February.

Despite the turmoil he lived through he died in Trier in 489 of natural causes and his relics are enshrined in the church Saint Matthias, Trier, Germany.

Titles of the Great Christian Church
Preceded by Miletius	Archbishop of Trier; 476 – 479	Succeeded by Maximianus of Trier
