= Monastère Notre-Dame-des-Sources =

- Interactive map of Monastère Notre-Dame-des-Sources

Monastery information
- Other names: Notre-Dame-des-Sources Conventual Priory, Lubumbashi Conventual Priory
- Order: Annunciation Congregation, Order of Saint Benedict
- Established: 1944
- Dedication: Notre-Dame-des-Sources
- Diocese: Roman Catholic Archdiocese of Lubumbashi

People
- Founders: Fr Van der Straten, OSB
- Prior: Boniface N'Kulu Lupitshi

Site
- Location: Kiswishi, Lubumbashi, Katanga, Democratic Republic of the Congo
- Coordinates: 11.5329°S 27.4677°E

Monastère Notre-Dame-des-Sources, Kiswishi, Lubumbashi, Democratic Republic of the Congo, is a Benedictine monastery of the Annunciation Congregation. Established in 1944 in Katanga Province, the monastic community was relocated to Kiswishi (Kisuishi), around 17 km from Lubumbashi, in the early 1960s. As of 2000, the monastery was home to 39 monks, under the leadership of Conventual Prior Fr Boniface N'Kulu Lupitshi.

== History ==
Benedictine monks from the monastery of Saint André, Brugge, arrived in the Belgian Congo in 1910. Undertaking missionary endeavors throughout Katanga Province, they constructed mission stations and schools. By the 1950s, more than a hundred monks resided in Katanga. The first two bishops of the Vicariate Apostolic of Katanga, José Floriberto Cornelis and Jean-Félix de Hemptinne, were Benedictine monks.

By 1944, the monks were prepared to cultivate indigenous vocations. Father Van der Straten, accompanied by seven local aspirants, founded a monastery in Mukaba-Kasari. In 1952, the foundation was transferred to Kansenia, a former mission station. Twelve years later, the monks again relocated, this time to the hill of Kiswishi, 15 km from Lubumbashi. On August 13, 1972, the monastery was raised to the status of a conventual priory, and a local monk was elected as the first prior.

== Apostolic work ==
Many of the monks at Monastère Notre-Dame-des-Sources are engaged in manual labor, including mechanics, farming, gardening, and raising chickens and rabbits. A trade school and medical center are also operated by the monks.

The community's ordained monks provide pastoral services in twelve nearby communities as part of the "Living Church" (CEV) program. They also minister at a local military camp.

Monks with intellectual training provide instruction at a number of education centers, including an Institute for Spirituality, a seminary, the College of John XXIII, and a Salesian theological school.

In 1968, a guesthouse with 38 rooms was opened. The monastic community continues to offer hospitality to those passing by, organizing weekends of recollection and extended retreats.

== Personnel ==
As of 2000, the community at Lubumbashi included 39 monks, nine of whom were ordained priests. The monks of Monastère Notre-Dame-des-Sources are under the leadership of Conventual Priory Boniface N'Kulu Lupitshi.

== See also ==
- Order of Saint Benedict
- Annunciation Congregation
- Roman Catholicism in the Democratic Republic of the Congo
