= Michael Felix Korum =

German Roman Catholic bishop (1840–1921)

- Bishop of Trier
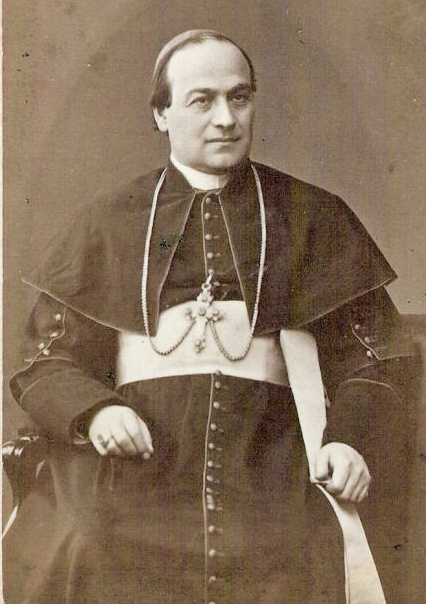
- Church: Catholic Church
- Diocese: Diocese of Trier
- In office: 12 August 1881 – 4 December 1921
- Predecessor: Matthias Eberhard
- Successor: Franz Rudolf Bornewasser

Orders
- Ordination: 23 December 1865
- Consecration: 14 August 1881 by Raffaele Monaco La Valletta

Personal details
- Born: 2 November 1840 Wickerschwihr, Haut-Rhin, Kingdom of France
- Died: 4 December 1921 (aged 81) Trier, Rhine Province, Free State of Prussia, Weimar Republic
- Coat of arms

Michael Felix Korum (born 2 November 1840 in Wickerschwihr; d. 4 December 1921 in Trier) was Bishop of Trier from 1881 to 1921.

He was appointed by Pope Leo XIII on 12 August 1881 and was ordained two days afterwards by Raffaele Monaco La Valletta.
