= Cyrillus of Trier =

5th-century bishop

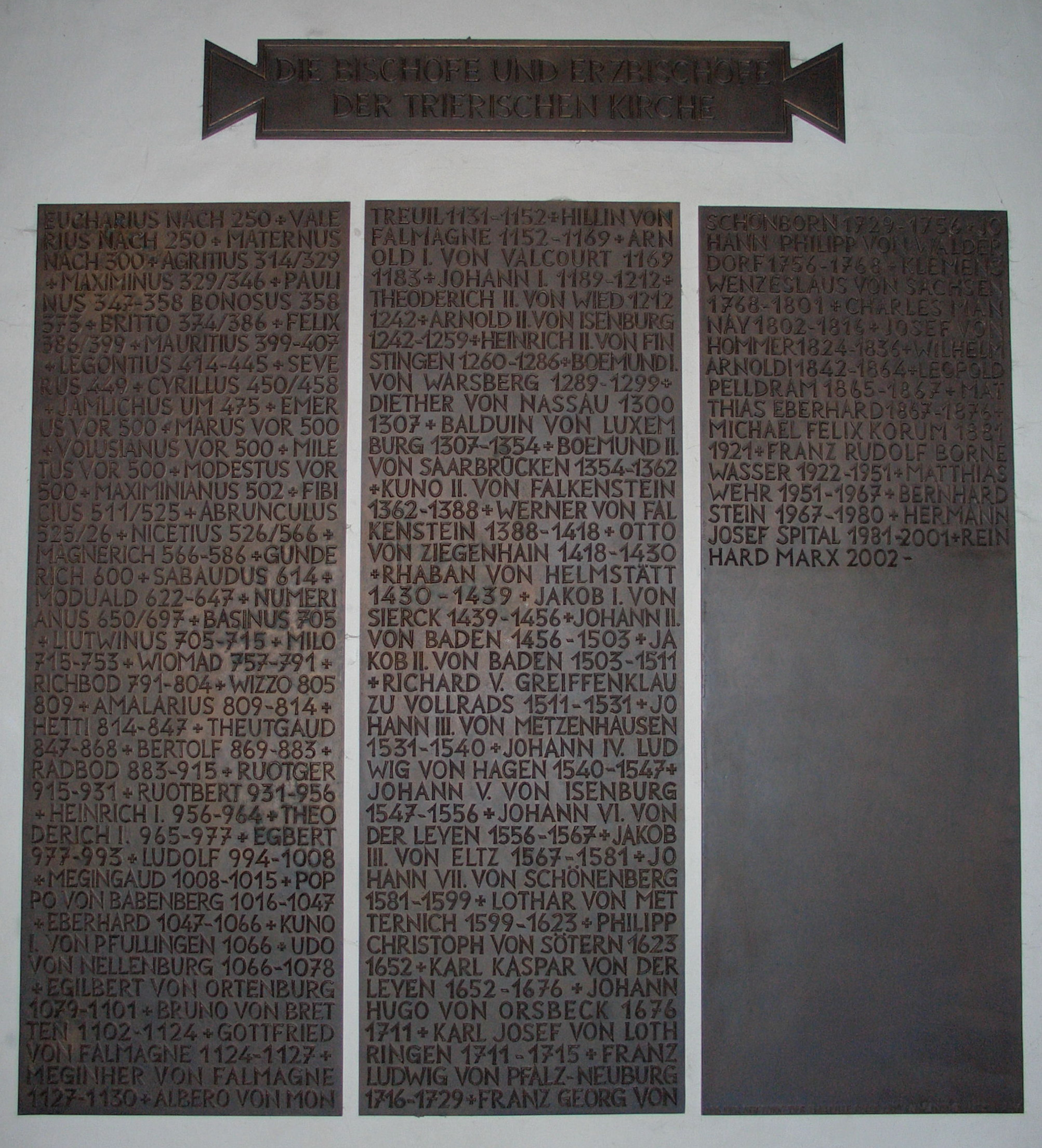
Tabula Episcoporum Trevirensium.

Cyril of Trier was Bishop of Trier from the beginning of the second half of the 5th century bishop of Trier. Some think he was a Greek.

In his time Trier fell to the Huns and there was general unrest in the year 451AD. In Gaul after the assassination of Emperor Valentinian III in 455 also fall in this time.

As Bishop, he built a new oratory and an inscription testifying to his rule has been found. The construction of the church was between 446/47 and 475/76. He was buried in the church but the exact location of the grave is not known.

Titles of the Great Christian Church
Preceded by Severus of Trier	Archbishop of Trier; 455 – 457	Succeeded by Iamblichus
