= Gunderich of Trier =

6th-century bishop

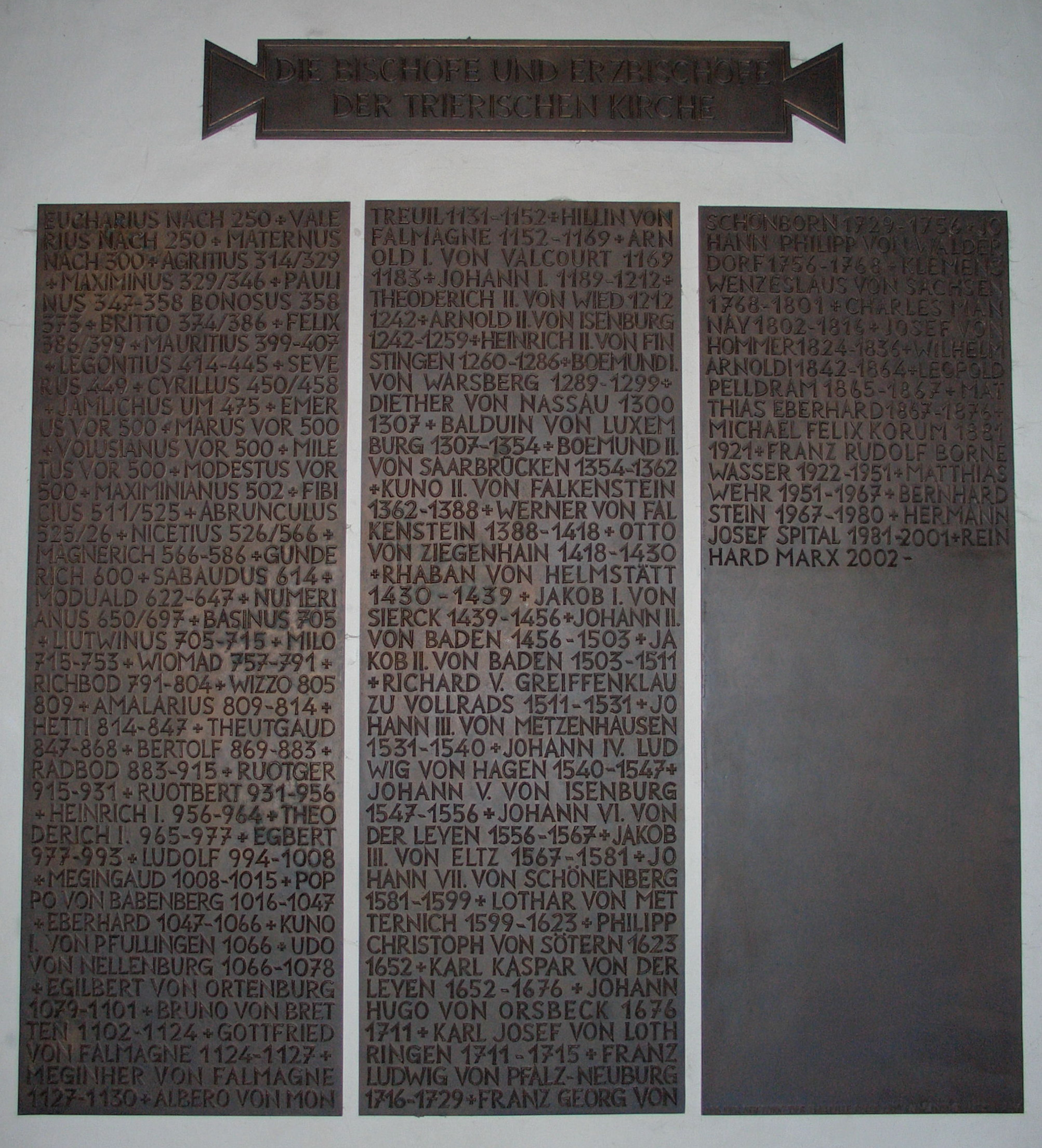
Tabula Episcoporum Trevirensium

Gunderich of Trier, also Gundwich (fl. c. 600) was a bishop of Trier, born in the 6th century.

Gunderich may well have become bishop of Trier as early as 586/588; he apparently remained bishop until his death some time before 614. He is known only from a bishops' list, in which he is placed after Magnerich,: he was therefore the second bishop of Trier of Germanic origin. He was reportedly buried in Trier Cathedral.

== See also ==
- Catholic Church in Germany

Titles of the Great Christian Church
Preceded by Saint Magnerich	Archbishop of Trier; 596 – 600	Succeeded by Sibald
