= Aprunculus of Trier =

6th-century Christian bishop

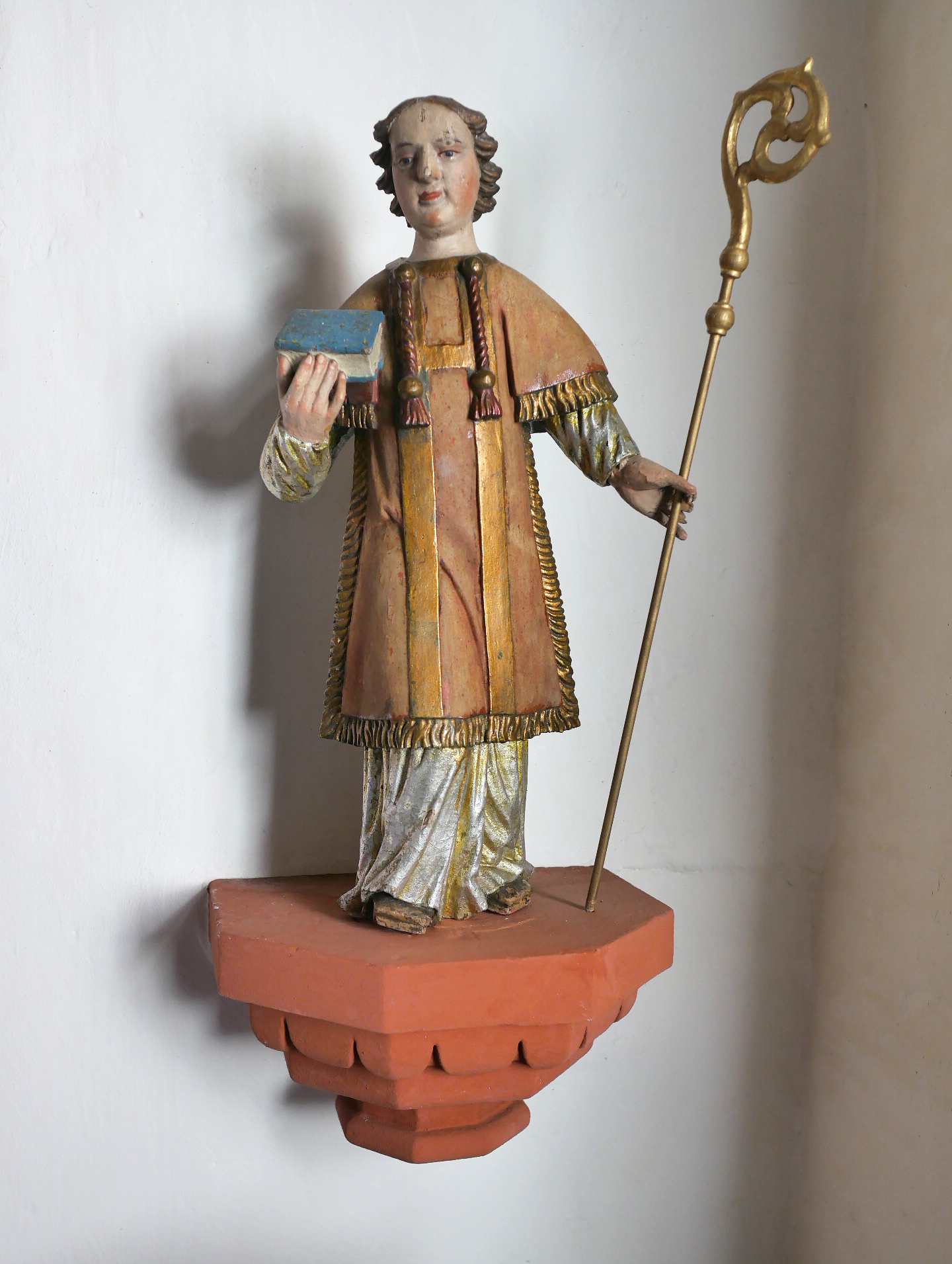
- Saint Aprunculus

bishop
- Died: 526; Trier
- Venerated in: Roman Catholic Church
- Feast: 22 April
- Patronage: Bruchsal

Saint Aprunculus of Trier (also known as Abrunculus) (died probably 526) was Bishop of Trier from the death of his predecessor, Fibicius, around 525, He served in that capacity until his own death in 526, and was succeeded by Nicetius.

Aprunculus is venerated as a saint; his feast day at Trier is 22 April. His relics are preserved at Springiersbach Abbey. He is the patron saint of Bruchsal in Baden-Württemberg.

== Life ==
Aprunculus may have belonged either to the disempowered pre-Frankish clergy of Trier or to the clergy sent to Trier from Auvergne by Theuderic I. There is a widespread story that Saint Gall was active in Trier at the same time as Aprunculus but this is unhistorical, as Gallus lived a century later, and likely confuses Saint Gall with Gallus of Clermont. The absence of information on the bishops of Trier in the late 5th and early 6th centuries in contemporary sources suggests that the church in Trier was not significant politically in this period.

== Veneration ==
Aprunculus was probably buried in a small oratory on the site of St. Symphorian's Abbey in Trier. Since the end of the 6th century he has been venerated as a saint. He is recorded in the Martyrologium Hieronymianum. Gregory of Tours mentions him.

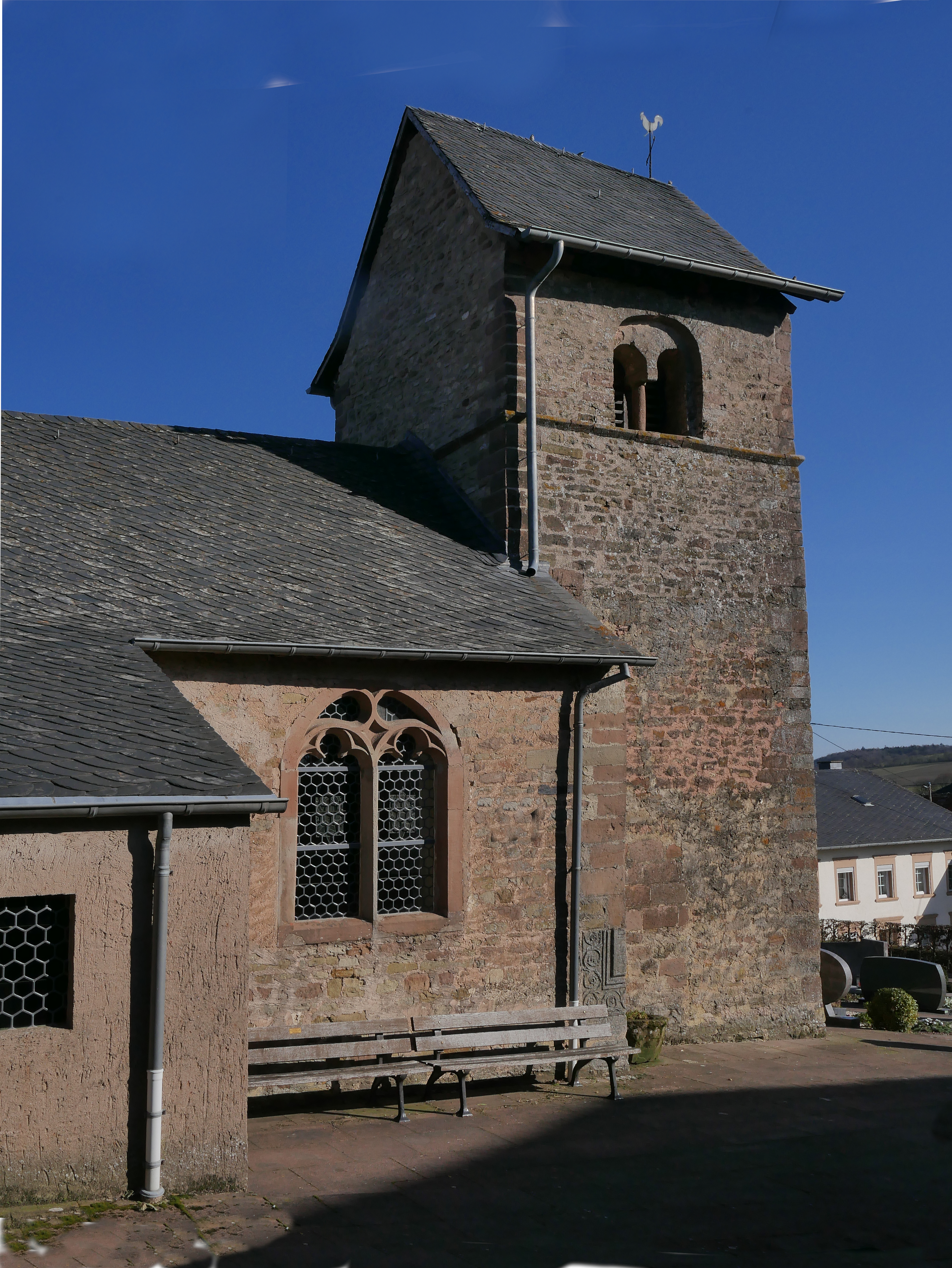
St. Abrunculus (Besslich)

There are reports of his veneration in Trier from the 10th century onwards, and also in Auxerre, Autun and Gellone in Languedoc. A portrait of him is found in the Egbert Psalter.

In 1047 his remains were transferred to St. Paulinus' Church, Trier, where his grave was in a small crypt under the altar of St. Clement in front of the choir. In 1107 some of the relics were taken, along with those of Saint Modoald, by Abbot Thietmar for Helmarshausen Abbey in North Hesse. Others came in 1136 to Springiersbach Abbey. At this time other bones may have been translated to the Aprunculus Chapel in the immediate vicinity of Trier Cathedral. The remaining bones in St. Paulinus' were brought into the city in 1674 before the destruction of the church. An inscribed lead plaque was removed from the coffin and placed in the reliquary.

Aprunculus is the patron saint of Bruchsal in Baden-Württemberg. In the area round Trier, he is patron of churches in Beßlich in Newel and Itzig (in Luxembourg).

His feast day is 22 April, which is likely the date of burial rather than his date of death.

== Literature ==
- Franz-Josef Heyen, 1972: Das Stift St. Paulin vor Trier (Germania Sacra NF 6, 1; v.a. 291–294). Berlin, New York
- Hans Hubert Anton, 1987: Trier im frühen Mittelalter, pp. 86–88. Paderborn, München u.a.
