= Conrad of Pfullingen =

German archbishop

Conrad of Pfullingen, sometimes Cuno of Pfullingen (Note: German: Kuno (Konrad) von Pfullingen) (1035/1040 – 1 June 1066), was the archbishop of Trier (as Cuno I) briefly in 1066.

He belonged to a noble family of Pfullingen. Prior to his elevation to the archbishopric he had been the provost of Cologne Cathedral. His uncle, Archbishop Anno of Cologne, in a bid to consolidate the supremacy of his church over Trier, invested Conrad with the archbishopric at court in May 1066, without the consent of the people or clergy of Trier. (Anno was the regent for the young Henry IV at the time.) On 17 May, on his way to Trier, Conrad was arrested by Count Theoderic, advocate of Trier. After a fortnight in prison, he was murdered by four of Theoderic's vassals at Ürzig on 1 June. Nobody was ever punished for the murder, and the people of Trier elected Udo of Nellenburg as archbishop in Conrad's place. In 1073, Theoderic went on a barefoot pilgrimage to Jerusalem to atone for his sin.

== Sources ==
- Endrulat, Bernhard (1882). "Konrad (Kuno) I., Erzbischof von Trier". Allgemeine Deutsche Biographie (in German). Vol. 16. Leipzig: Duncker & Humblot. p. 627.
- Hamilton, Sarah (2001). The Practice of Penance, 900–1050. Woodbridge: Boydell Press.
- Gawlik, Alfred (1980). "Konrad I.". Neue Deutsche Biographie (in German). Vol. 12. Berlin: Duncker & Humblot. p. 530. (full text online).
- Robinson, Ian S. (2000). Henry IV of Germany. New York: Cambridge University Press.
- Tellenbach, Gerd (1993). The Church in Western Europe from the Tenth to the Early Twelfth Century. Cambridge: Cambridge University Press.
