= Fibicius of Trier =

6th-century Christian bishop

Fibicius (otherwise Fibitius or Felicius) was Bishop of Trier from around 511 to 525 or so. He is commemorated on November 5.

== Life ==
Fibicius was abbot of the monastery of St. Maximin's Abbey, Trier. He became bishop of Trier in 511. His tenure as bishop in the first quarter of the 6th century fell in the politically troubled times during the expansion of Frankish power into the region around Trier.

His name is given in the Trier bishops' lists and in the Vita Goaris, a hagiography of Saint Goar. While he was bishop, the revival of the power of the church in Trier was gradually beginning after a period of obscurity and weakness due to the political situation. This is evidenced by the resumption of earlier attempts at evangelization in areas on the Middle Rhine. In this context, Fibicius probably gave permission in about 511 to Saint Goar to build a church in Oberwesel. He may have also requested King Theuderic I to send priests from the Auvergne to Trier.

After his death he was probably buried in the old church of St. Nicholas in Trier. His successor was Aprunculus; the bishop called Rusticus whose name is sometimes inserted into the bishops' lists between the two seems to have no existence outside the Vita Goaris.

Fibicius is venerated as either a saint or a blessed; his feast day is 5 November. No further information is available about the circumstances of his death.

== Sources ==
- Hans Hubert Anton: Trier im frühen Mittelalter (= Quellen und Forschungen aus dem Gebiete der Geschichte. N.F., 9). Paderborn u. a. 1987, ISBN 3-506-73259-5, pp. 87f.
- Entry in Vollständiges Heiligen-Lexikon, Band 2. Augsburg 1861, (in German).

Titles of the Great Christian Church
Preceded by Maximianus of Trier	Fibicius; 500 – 526	Succeeded by Aprunculus
