= Johannes Enen =

Roman Catholic prelate

Most Reverend Johannes Enen
- Auxiliary Bishop Emeritus of Trier; Titular Bishop of Azotus
- Church: Catholic Church
- Diocese: Diocese of Trier
- In office: 1517–1519

Personal details
- Born: 1483 Ehnen, Luxembourg
- Died: 31 Jul 1519 (age 36) Trier, Germany

Johannes Enen (1483–1519) was a Roman Catholic prelate who served as Auxiliary Bishop of Trier (1517–1519).

== Biography ==
Johannes Enen was born in Ehnen, Luxembourg in 1483. On 13 Nov 1517, he was appointed during the papacy of Pope Leo X as Auxiliary Bishop of Trier and Titular Bishop of Azotus. He served as the Auxiliary Bishop of Trier until his death on 31 Jul 1519.
