= St. Matthias' Abbey =

Benedictine monastery in Trier, Germany

Coordinates: 49°44′17″N 6°37′55″E

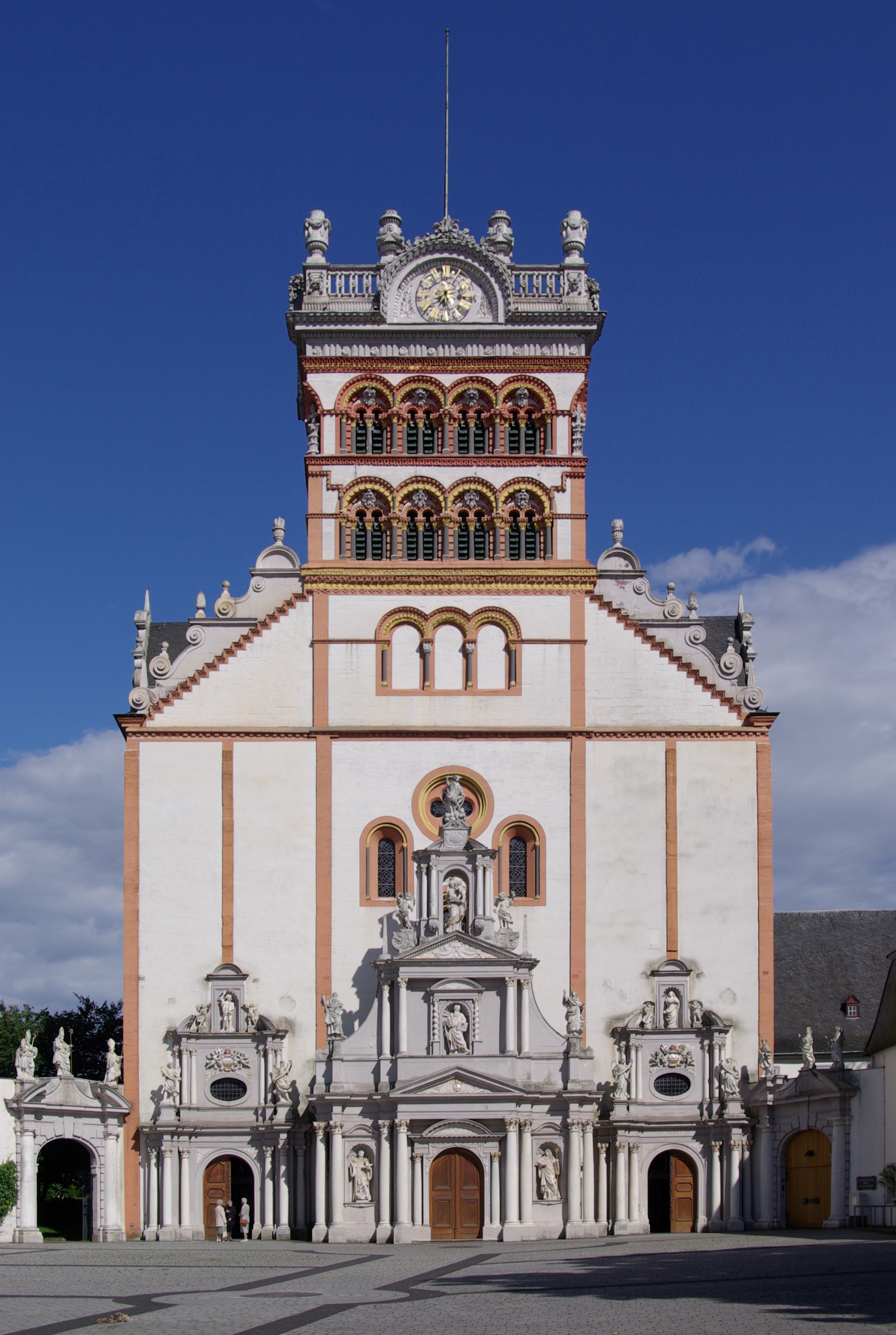
St. Matthias' Abbey.

St. Matthias' Abbey is a Benedictine monastery in Trier, Rhineland-Palatinate, Germany, that belongs to the Congregation of the Annunciation.

The abbey church, a Romanesque basilica, is a renowned pilgrimage site because of the tomb of Saint Matthias the Apostle, after whom the abbey is named, located here since the 12th century, and the only burial of an apostle in Germany and north of the Alps. The abbey was originally named after Saint Eucharius, first Bishop of Trier, whose tomb is in the crypt. The church has been given the status of a minor basilica.

== First foundation ==
Monks have lived in the present St. Matthias' Abbey since late antiquity. Cyrillus of Trier built an oratory here in the second half of the 5th century and gave the monks a rule. The monastery adopted the Rule of Saint Benedict in about 977.

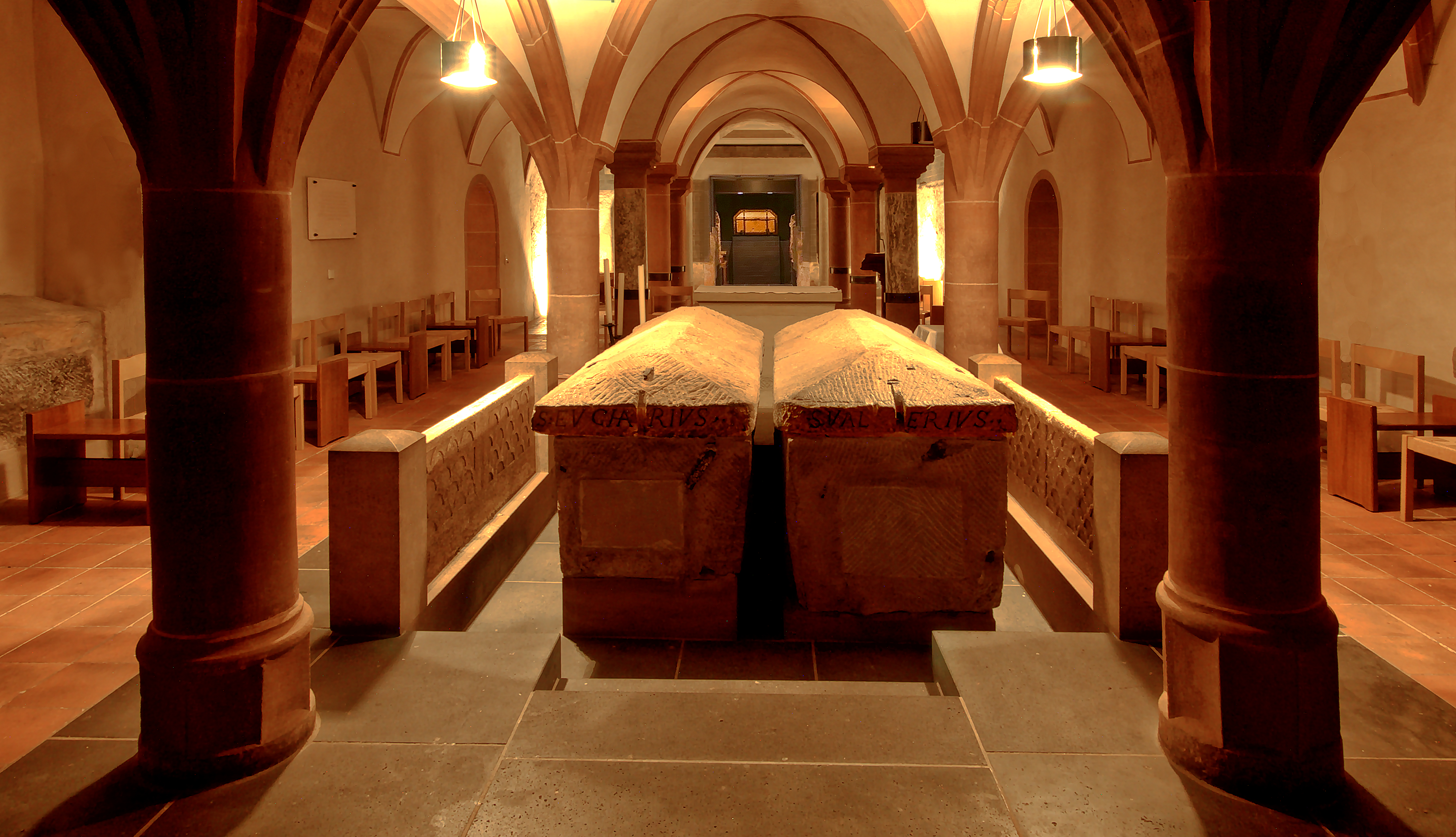
The tombs of Eucharius and Valerius

Since the 10th century the bones of the founders of the Archbishopric of Trier, bishops Eucharius and Valerius, have been preserved here.

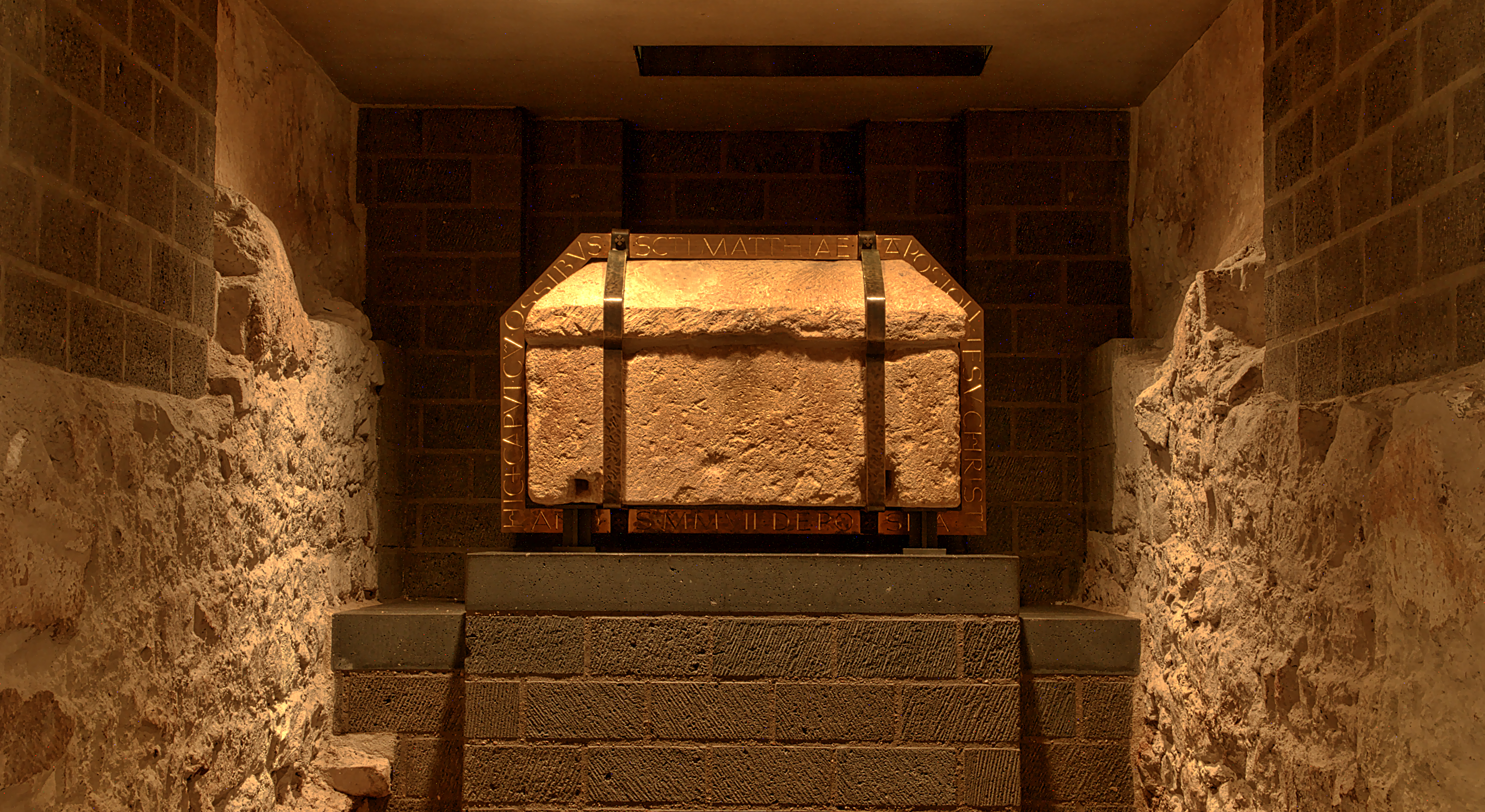
The tomb of Saint Matthias

The bones of the Apostle Matthias were supposedly sent to Trier on the authority of the Empress Helena, mother of the Roman emperor Constantine I, but the relics were only discovered in 1127 during demolition work on the predecessor of the present church buildings, since which time the abbey has been a major centre of pilgrimage.

In the 12th century, the manuscript now known as Kues 52, an important witness to the Collectaneum of Sedulius Scottus and the Proverbia Grecorum, was copied at St. Matthias'.

Efforts to reform in the wake of the Council of Basel, under Johannes Rode, the Carthusian prior appointed by the bishop, led to spiritual and economic renewal, to the extent that St. Matthias' became an example for other monasteries. In 1433, at the request of Duke Otto of Brunswick, John Dederoth, having effected notable reforms at Clus Abbey, turned his attention to the extremely neglected and dilapidated Bursfelde Abbey. He was able to obtain two exemplary monks from St. Matthias' Abbey to maintain his reformed discipline there. In 1458 St. Matthias' joined the Bursfelde Congregation.

The eastern part of the crypt was added around 1500. A Baroque facade was later added to the lower west front of the church.

The abbey passed through the Reformation almost unscathed, but it was badly affected by wars and looting, and also by conflicts with various bishops or abbots. The last abbot was relieved of his office as early as 1783, years before the actual dissolution of the abbey, and management from then on lay in the hands of the prior.

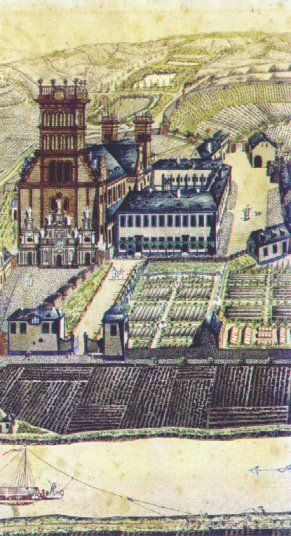
Watercolour of the abbey, c. 1783

church bells

When the troubles of the French Revolution spilled over onto German territory, the abbey buildings were requisitioned by the French army, and monks were obliged to leave the abbey, at first with the intention that this was to be a temporary absence, living from 1794 to 1802 in the parish house (Mattheiser Pfarrhaus). In 1802 however the abbey was nationalised and secularised. When the premises were sold off, the local businessman Christoph Philipp Nell acquired the bulk of the main building complex and used it with little alteration for his residence, thus preserving it from the demolition and gross alterations for industrial purposes that befell many other monastic buildings at this period.

Apart from the main abbey complex there remain, particularly in villages along the Moselle, many farmhouses and estate buildings which formed the abbey's economic basis before secularisation. They are often called "Mattheiser Hof" ("Matthias' farm") or other names making reference to the abbey. An especially large farm of this sort was the Roscheider Hof near the village of Merzlich (now Konz-Karthaus), now the Volkskunde- und Freilichtmuseum Roscheider Hof ("Local History and Open-air Museum, Roscheider Hof"), where the original building is preserved as one of the exhibits.

== Second foundation ==
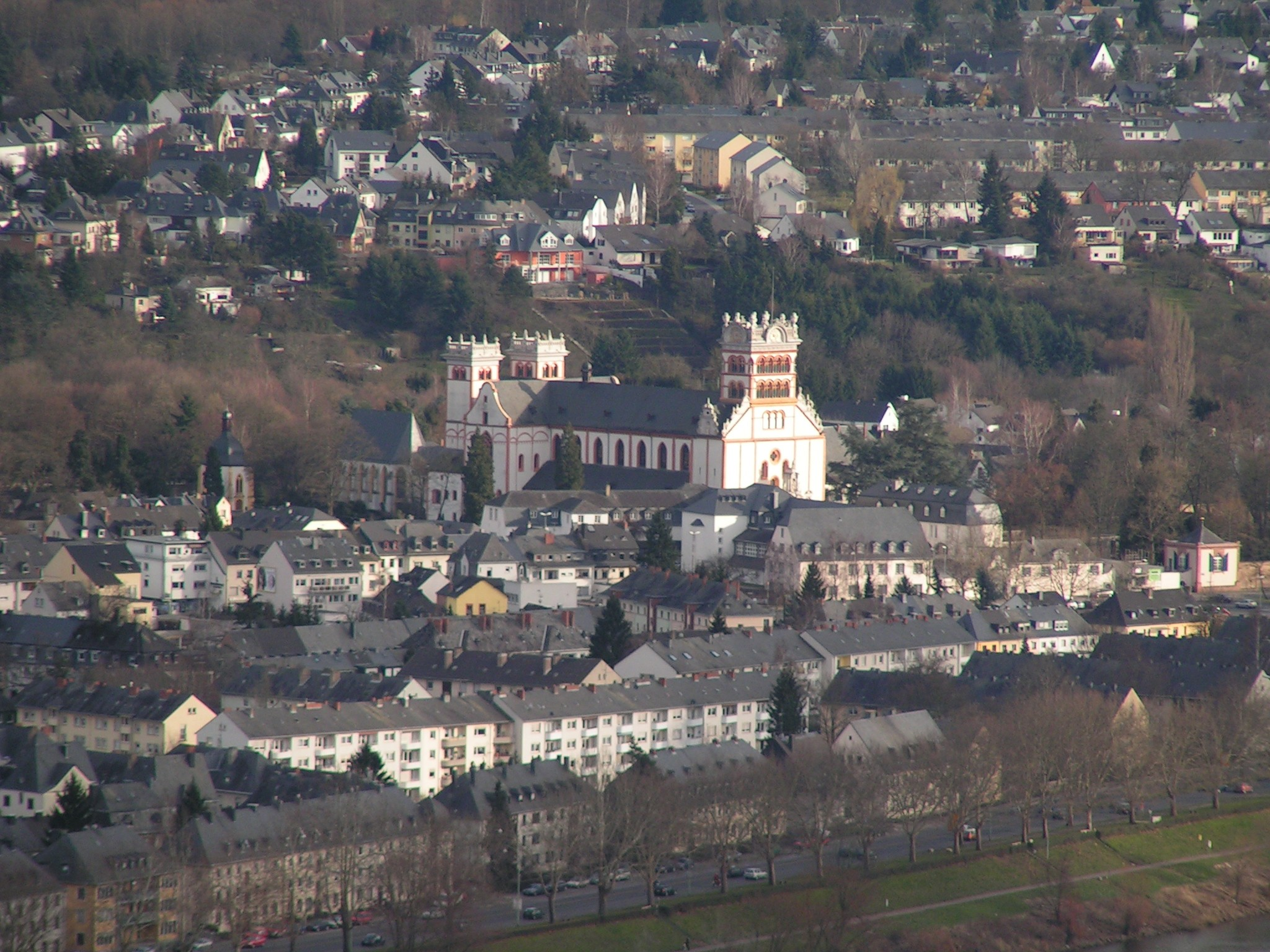
St. Matthias' Abbey from the Mariensäule

After several attempts to revive the monastery in the 19th century, monks from Seckau Abbey, part of the Beuron Congregation, moved into the Mattheiser Pfarrhaus after World War I. On 22 October 1922 the main building complex was rededicated as a Benedictine abbey and resettled. The new community joined the Beuron Congregation.

In 1941 the National Socialist government suspended the monastery and the monks moved to Maria Laach Abbey. After their return in 1945 there was dissension over the care of the parish of St. Matthias, which was now independent of the Benedictine order, for whom parochial duties with the secure income they provided represented a staple economic resource. It was recommended that the monastic community should move to Tholey Abbey in the Saarland, a move which split the community between those who were willing to go to Tholey, and those who preferred to stay in Trier. Those monks who remained in St. Matthias' became independent of any congregation, and remained so until 1981, when they joined the Congregation of the Annunciation of the Blessed Virgin Mary ("Congregatio Annuntiationis BMV").

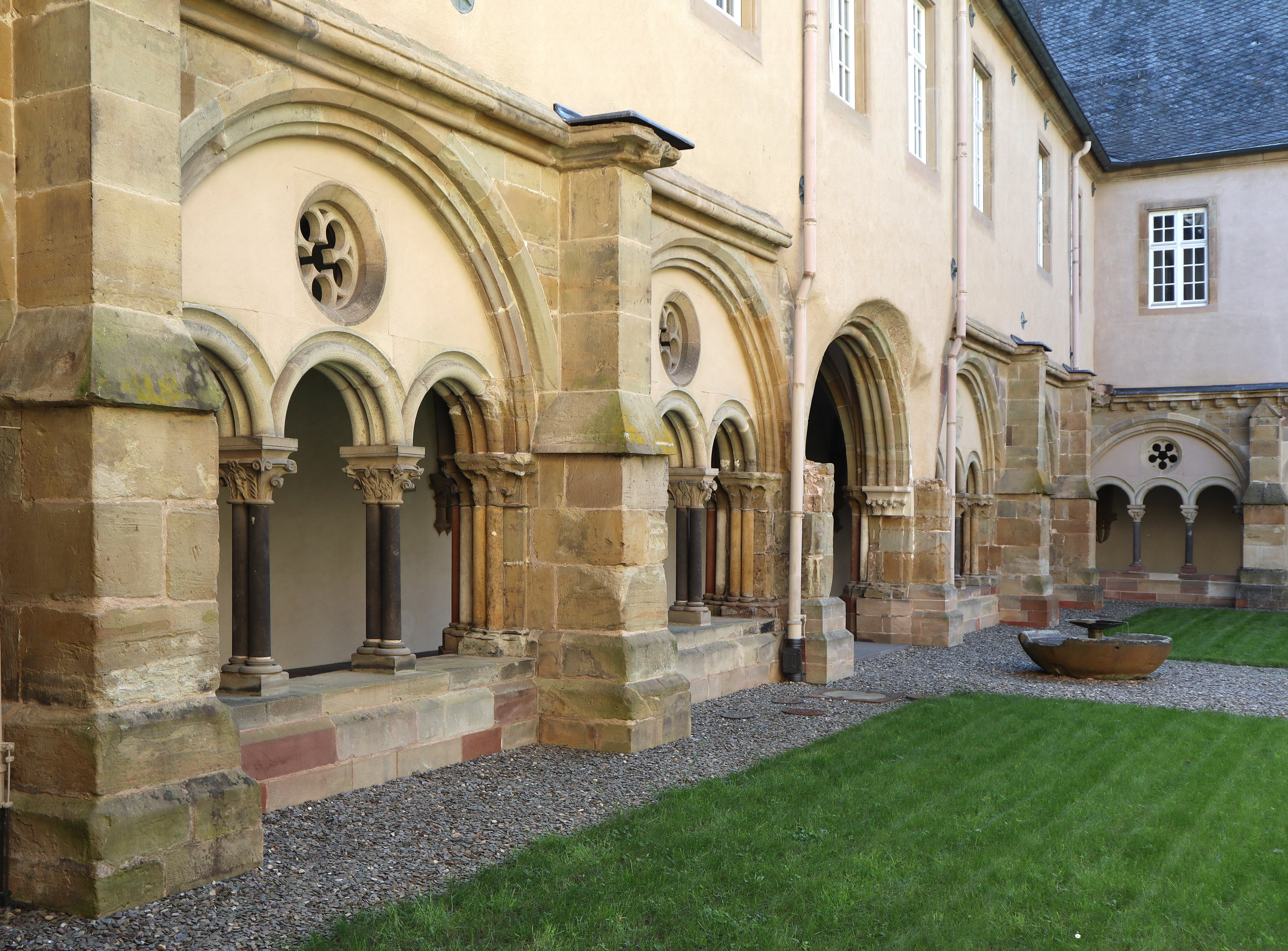
Cloister (southern aisle)

Since 1991 the abbey has had a close link with Huysburg Priory in Saxony-Anhalt, refounded in 1972. In September 2004 the two monasteries joined as one community.

The community devotes itself to the cure of souls - in 2007 10,000 Roman Catholics belonged to the parish of St. Matthias - as well as hospital and pilgrimage duties. The community also receives guests and leads ecumenical discussions. Individual brothers may also pursue secular occupations, such as judge, town planner or teacher.

From 1981 to 2005 Dom Ansgar Schmidt led the community as its abbot until his election as President-Abbot of the Congregation. Ignatius Maaß was elected his successor, and nominated Matthias Vogt as his new prior; the benediction took place on 22 October 2005.

As of 2007 19 monks lived in the abbey.

== Buildings and art ==
=== Basilica ===
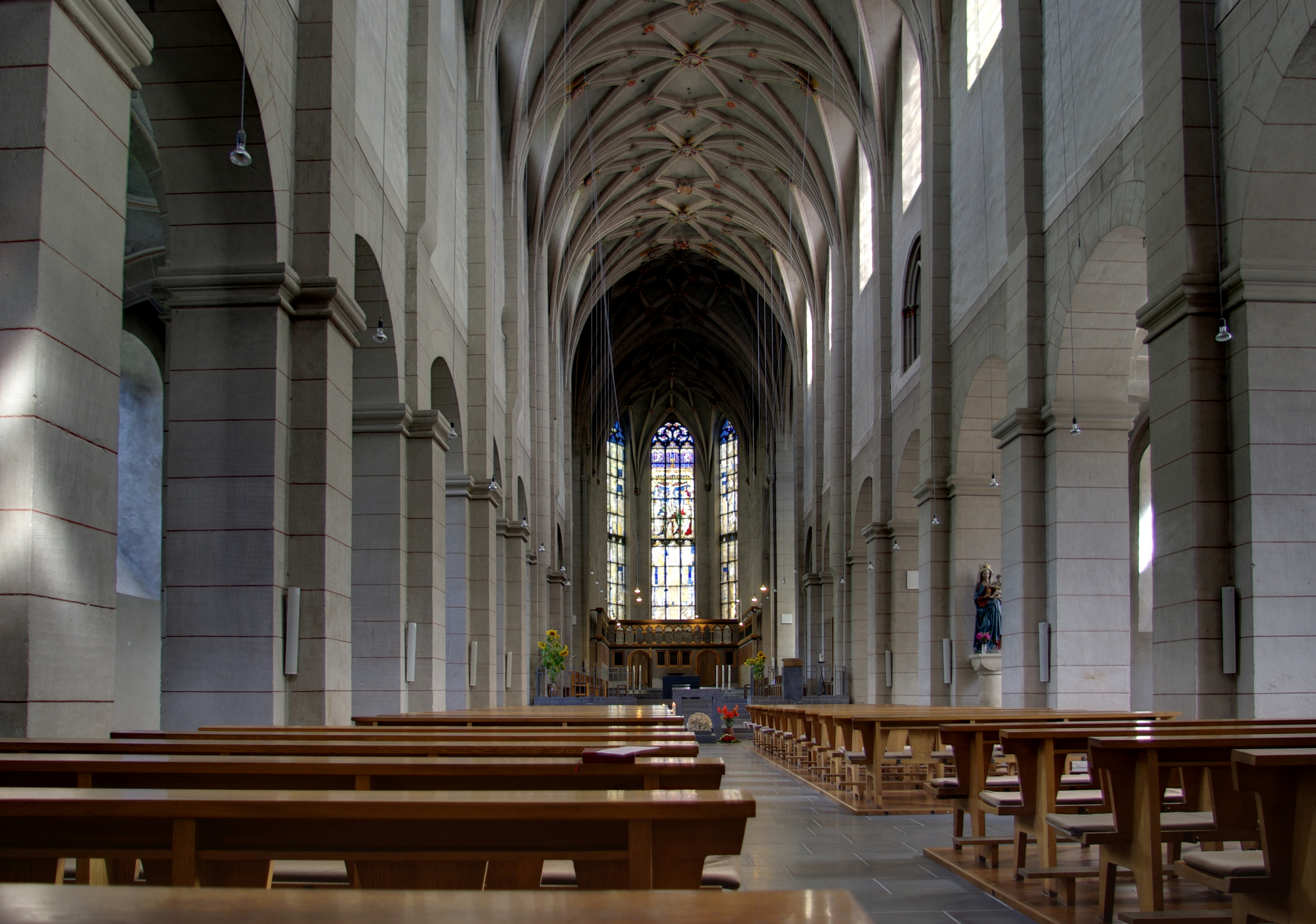
Nave of the basilica

The Romanesque St. Matthias' Basilica, which was dedicated on 13 January 1148, combines four functions. It is the parish church of the parish of the same name; the monastic church of the Benedictine community; a pilgrimage church centred on the tomb of Saint Matthias the Apostle; and the burial church of the first bishops of Trier, Eucharius und Valerius. The church building, like all such, is in a constant state of tension between on the one hand the preservation and care of the structure, and on the other the need to meet current demands.

The basilica has therefore been thoroughly transformed during a long-drawn-out exercise in cleaning up and alteration. The crypt has been extended by a further two bays and provided with new means of access. The place of the veneration of Saint Matthias the Apostle, as well as the altar space, have been adapted to modern requirements. Stable choir stalls have been built for the monks' choir. A lift has been installed for easier access to all levels. On 10 December 2007 during a solemn pontifical office with Bishop Reinhard Marx the bones of the Apostle Matthias in their shrine were translated to their final location in the crypt, with the solemn dedication of the altar planned for 24 February 2008. The conclusion of the building works with an overhaul of the electrics and a final paint job is not presently possible due to financial constraints.

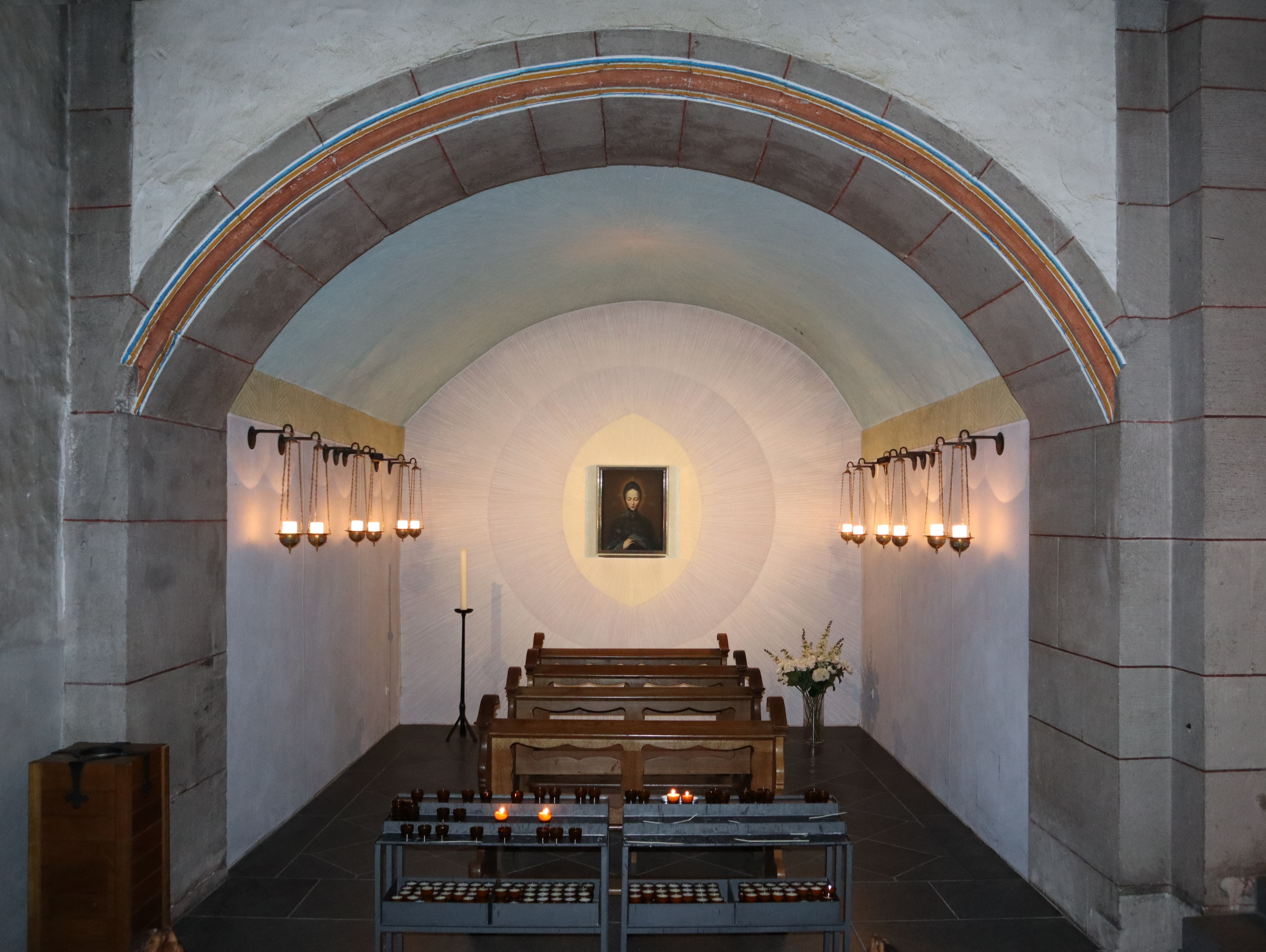
Gnadenkapelle in the northern aisle

The Abbey church is considered a Marian shrine as it contains a Gnadenbild, an image of the Blessed Virgin that depicts the pregnant Mary, gazing in contemplation at the child she carries.

=== Reliquary of the Cross ===
In the Chapel of the Cross (Kreuzkapelle) in the north side-tower of the basilica is kept the reliquary of the cross, or "staurotheca". It dates from the 13th century and is made of worked gold; in the centre is a golden cross set with precious stones, which is said to contain pieces of the True Cross. The Chapel of the Cross is accessible on guided tours.

== Mattheiser Venus ==
The Mattheiser Venus or Venus of St. Matthias was an ancient Roman marble statue of the goddess Venus, which was formerly kept at the St. Matthias' Abbey. The statue of the goddess of love was kept on display in chains by the wall of the monastery marked with the following inscription:

„WOLT IHR WISSEN WAS ICH BIN
ICH BIN GEWESEN EIN ABGOTTIN
DA S. EVCHARIVS ZV TRIER KAM
ER MICH ZERBRACH MEIN EHR ABNAHM
ICH WAR GEEHRET ALS EIN GOTT
IETZ STEHEN ICH HIE DER WELT ZV SPOT.“

It was an established custom at the monastery to stone the statue annually to ritually celebrate the victory of Christianity over "Paganism" by annual desecration of the statue. This custom allegedly took place since the Middle Ages, but is confirmed since at least 1551. The statue was reduced to rubble, but the remains of it was transferred by the French commander of the town to a historical society in 1811. It is now kept at the Rheinisches Landesmuseum Trier.

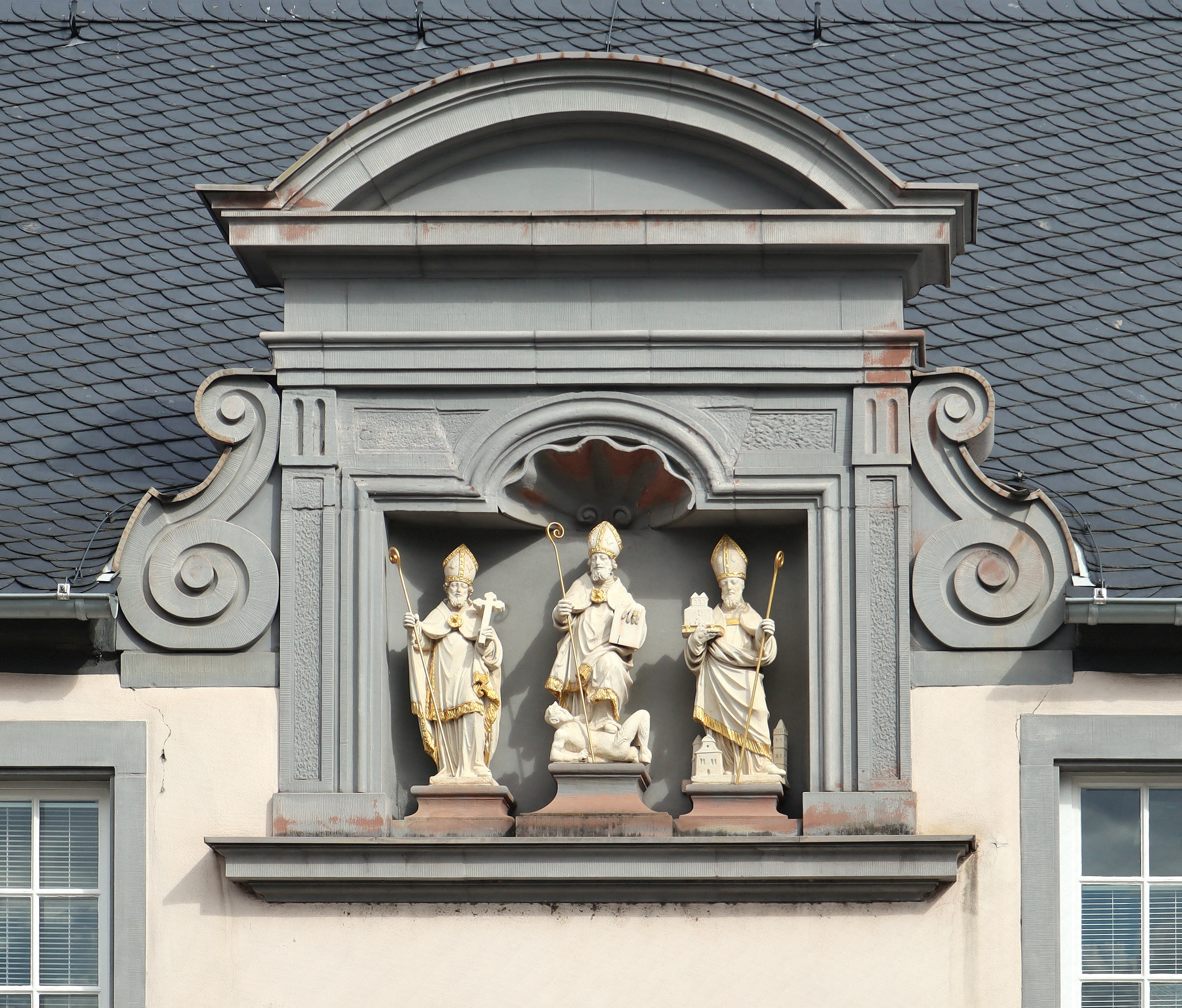
Sculpture of the first three bishops of Trier

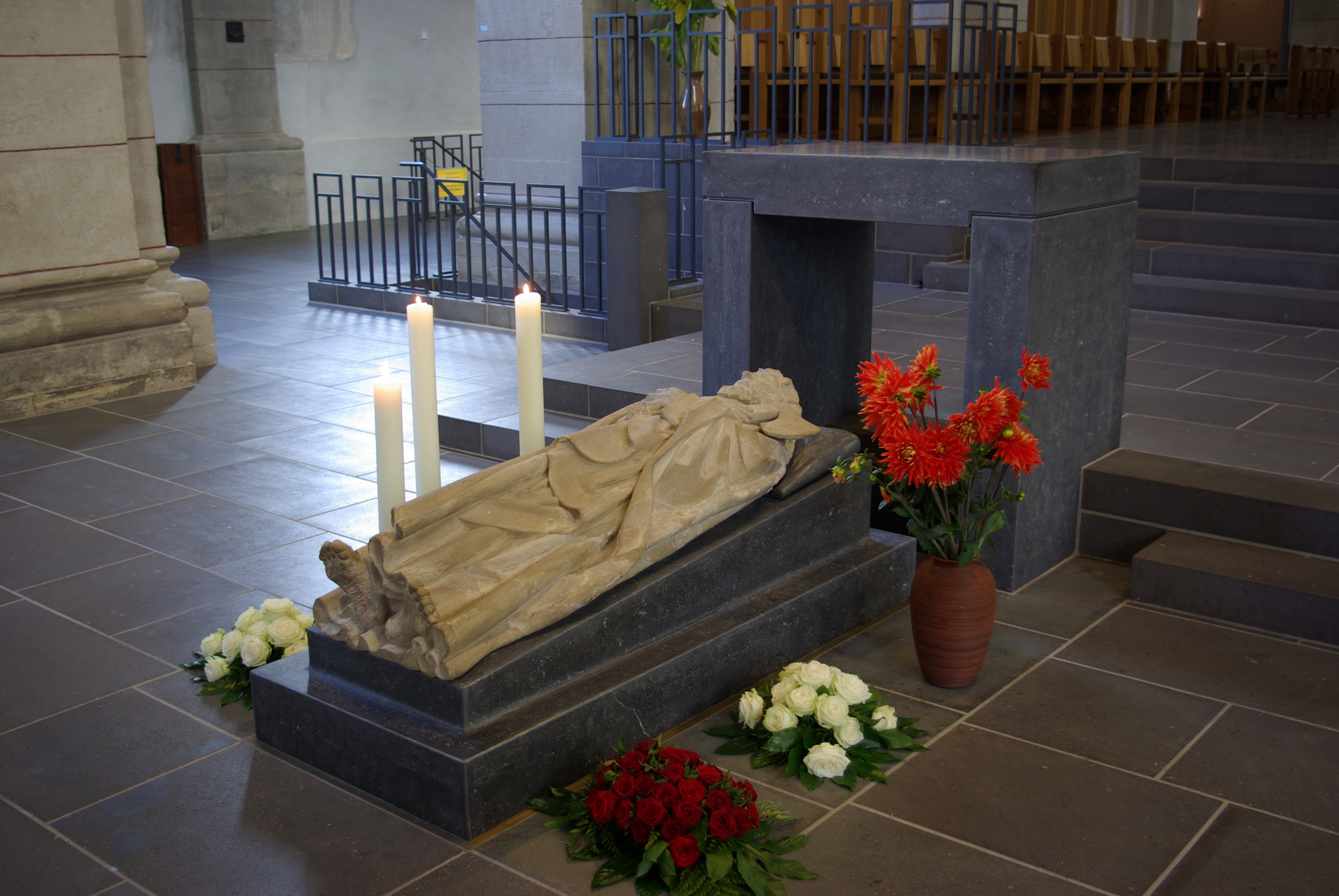
Monumental effigy over the Apostle's grave

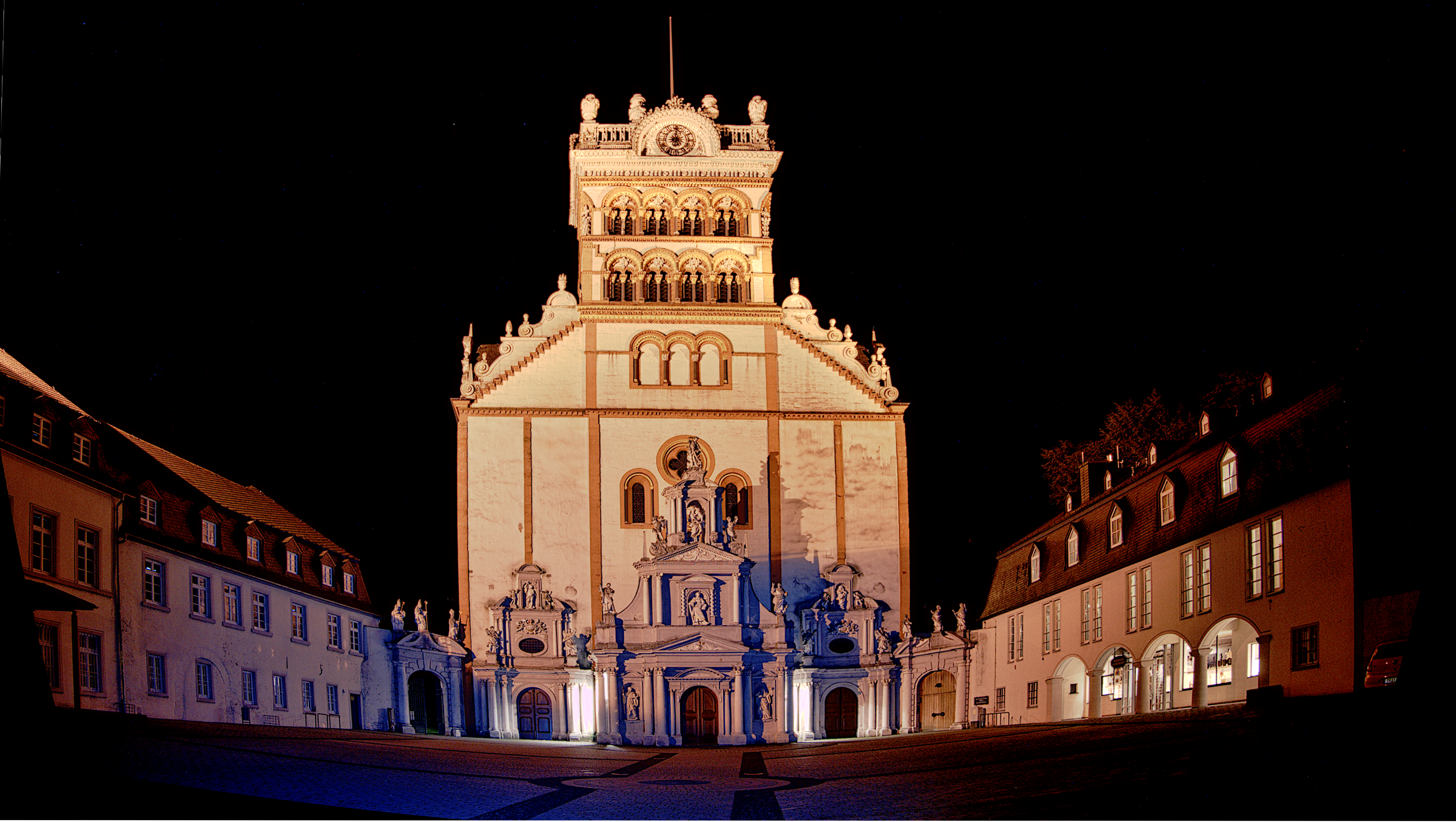
Frontage at night

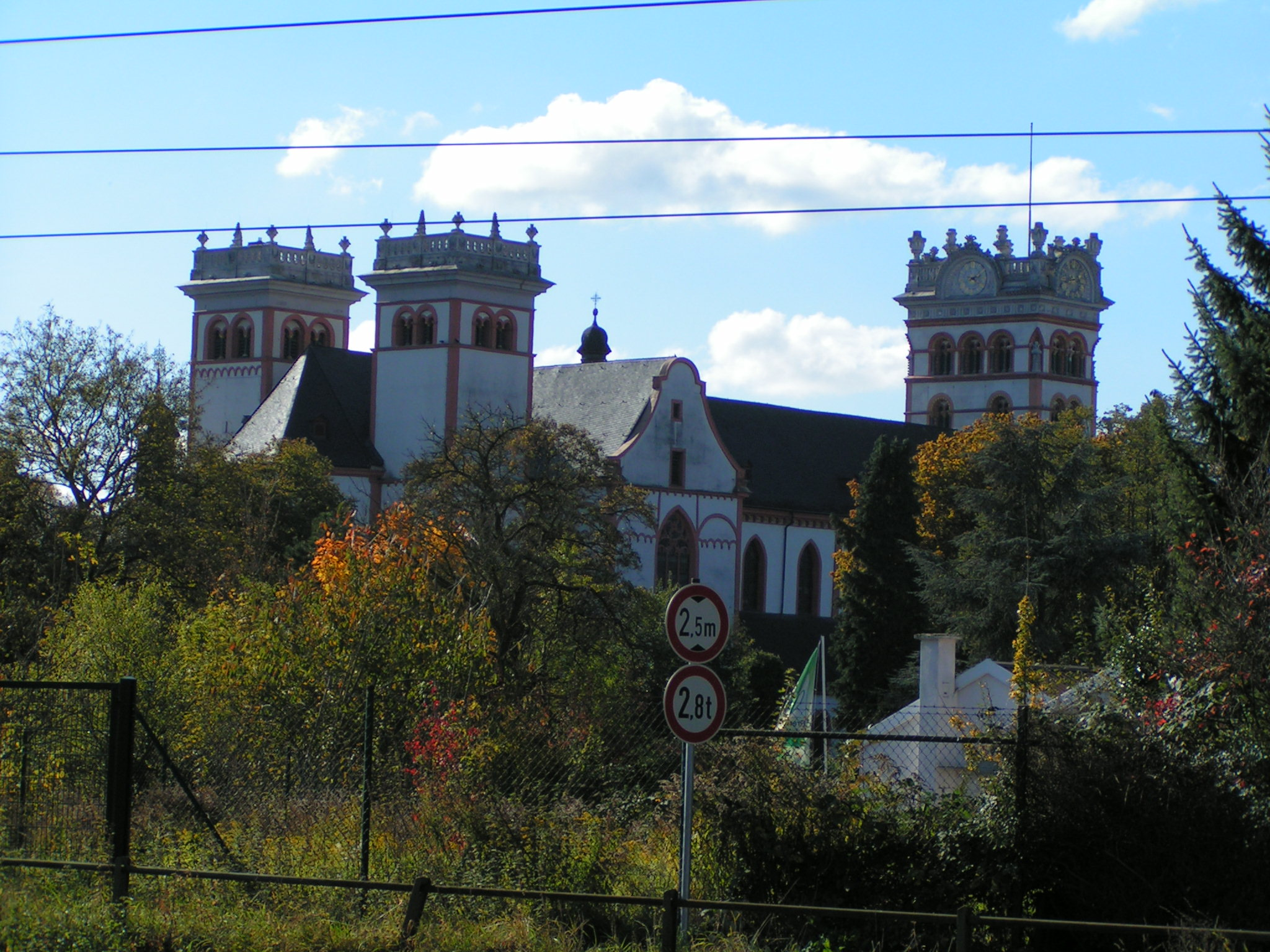
Rear view of the abbey

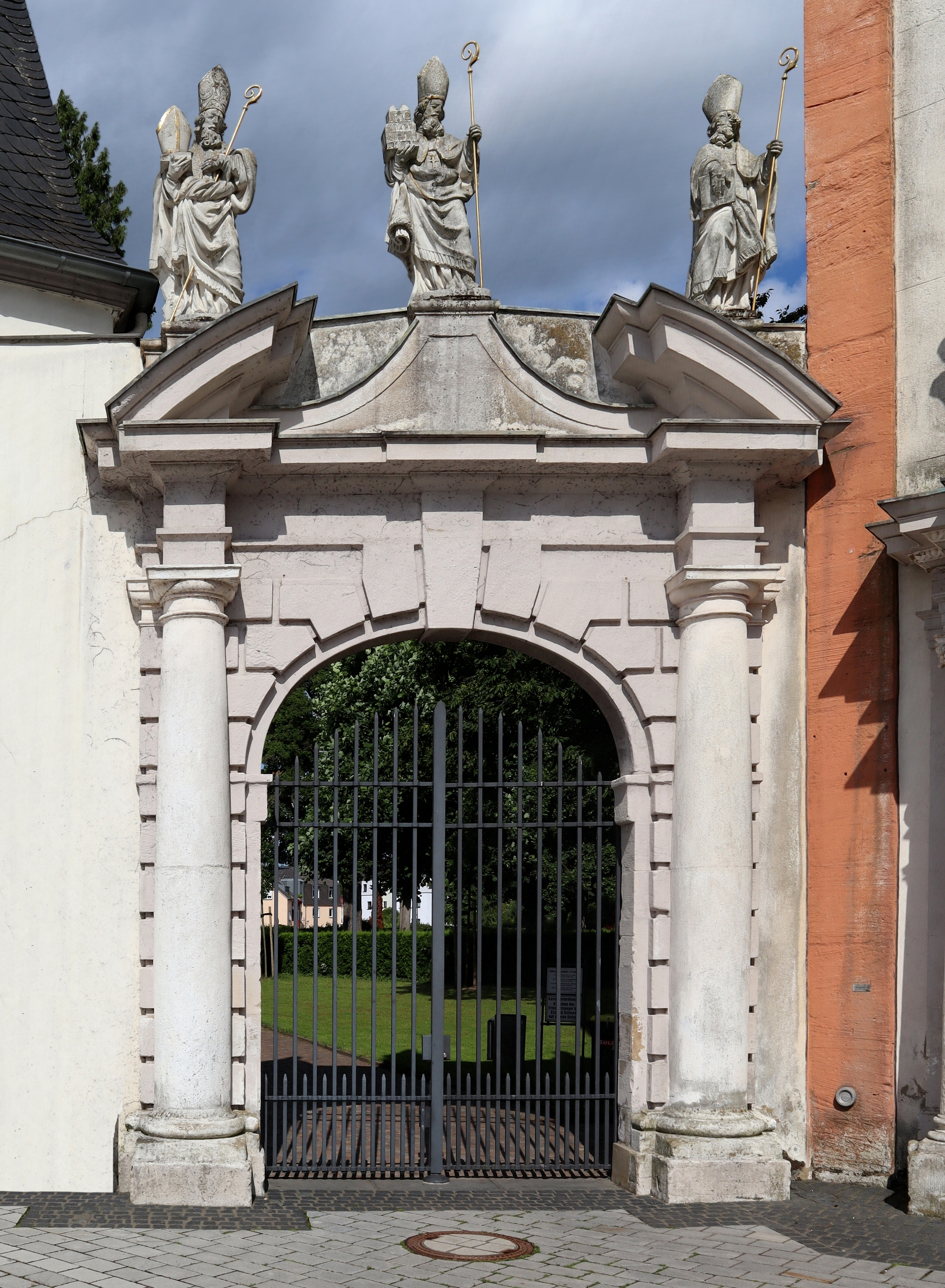
Gate to the cemetery

== Abbots (incomplete list) ==
- 1211–1257: Jakob of Lorraine
- 1416–1421: Herbrand von Guls
- 1421–1439: Johannes Rode
- 1439–1447: Johannes von Vorst
- 1447–1451: Heinrich Wolff von Sponheim
- 1451–: Johannes Donre
- 1569–1573: Peter von Niederweiß
- 1599–1612: Johann von Keil
- 1629–1649: Nikolaus Trinkler
- 1700–1727: Wilhelm Henn
- 1727–1758: Modestus Manheim
- 1758–1773: Adalbert Wiltz

After the refoundation:

- 1922–1938: Laurentius Zeller (elected Archabbot of the Brazilian Congregation 1938)
- 1939–1946: Basilius Ebel (1946–1966 Abbot of Maria Laach Abbey)
- 1947–1949: Petrus Borne (1949–1976 Abbot of Tholey Abbey)

The community split in 1949: one part resettled in Tholey with Abbot Petrus Borne; the remainder in Trier belonged to no congregation and was directly subordinate to the Abbot-Primate of the Benedictine Order.

- 1963–1969: Laurentius Klein
- 1969–1981: Athanasius Polag
- 1981–2005: Ansgar Schmidt (2004–2018 President of the Congregation of the Annunciation)
- 2005–: Ignatius Maaß

== Relations to other communities ==
- Benedictine priory on the Huysburg: since September 2004 St. Matthias' Abbey has formed one single community with the brothers of the Huysburg Priory near Halberstadt in Saxony-Anhalt.
- St. Matthias' belongs to the Congregation of the Annunciation of the Blessed Virgin Mary (Congregatio Annuntiationis BMV).
- St. Scholastica's Abbey, Burg Dinklage: St. Matthias' has a long and close relationship with the Benedictine nunnery of St. Scholastica's, Dinklage.
- Community of the Resurrection, Mirfield: St. Matthias' also has a partnership with the Anglican Community of the Resurrection, Mirfield, in England.

Delegations from St. Matthias' visit both Dinklage and Mirfield every year, who in turn send every year a delegation to St. Matthias'.
