= Matthias Eberhard =

Bishop of Trier (1815–1876)

- Bishop of Trier
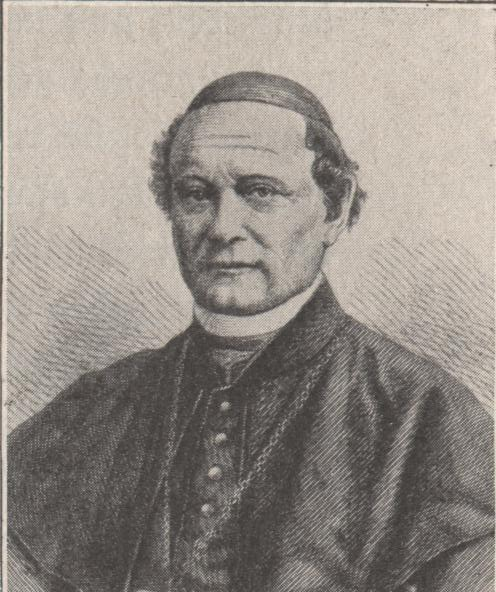
- Church: Catholic Church
- Diocese: Diocese of Trier
- In office: 20 September 1867 – 30 May 1876
- Predecessor: Leopold Pelldram
- Successor: Michael Felix Korum
- Previous posts: Titular Bishop of Paneade (1862-1867); Auxiliary Bishop of Trier (1862-1867)

Orders
- Ordination: 23 February 1839
- Consecration: 3 August 1862 by Wilhelm Arnoldi

Personal details
- Born: 1 November 1815 Trier, Grand Duchy of the Lower Rhine, Kingdom of Prussia, German Confederation
- Died: 30 May 1876 (aged 60) Trier, Rhine Province, Kingdom of Prussia, German Empire
- Coat of arms

Matthias Eberhard (born 15 November 1815, at Trier, Germany, died there 30 May 1876) was a German Roman Catholic Bishop of Trier. After successfully completing the gymnasium course of his native town, he devoted himself to the study of theology, was ordained in 1839, and soon after made assistant at St. Castor's in Coblenz. In 1842 Bishop Wilhelm Arnoldi made him his private secretary, and, at the end of the same year, professor of dogmatics in the seminary of Trier.

From 1849 to 1862 he was director of the seminary and also preacher at the cathedral; in 1850 he became a member of the chapter; from 1852 to 1856 he was representative of his fellow-citizens in the Prussian Lower Chamber, where he joined the Catholic section. On 7 April 1862, he was preconized as auxiliary bishop of Trier; after Arnoldi's death he was proposed for the episcopal see, but the Prussian government acknowledged him only after the death of Arnoldi's successor, Leopold Pelldram, 16 July 1867. Having chosen Charles Borromeo for his ideal, he spared no exertion to make his clergy learned and devout, and to cultivate a religious spirit in the people. He took care that religious associations were established, and tried to found everywhere good libraries.

At the First Vatican Council he appeared several times as a speaker. He belonged to the minority of the bishops, who considered the definition of the papal infallibility as inopportune for the time being. As soon as the matter had been decided, he published the constitution at once.

When, in the beginning of the 1870s, the Prussian government wished to fetter bishops and priests by its ecclesiastico-political legislation, Bishop Eberhard defended the rights of the Church and became one of the first victims of the so-called Kulturkampf. He was fined a large sum. Since he could not pay it, he was retained in the prison of Trier from 6 March to 31 December 1874.

He was the author of a dissertation "De tituli Sedis Apostolicae ad insigniendam sedem Romanam usu antiquo ac vi singulari" (Trier, 1877–1883; Freiburg, 1894–1903).
