= Maximianus of Trier =

German Catholic bishop and saint

Maximianus of Trier was bishop of Trier around the turn of the 5th and 6th centuries.

Bishop Maximianus, the predecessor of Fibicius who had taken over as bishop by 502, is apparently the bishop mentioned in a letter from Archbishop Avitus of Vienne to Caesarius of Arles, dated to the period 502–508, and certainly no later than 513, which is a letter of recommendation on behalf of a blinded bishop, described as "holy", who wanted to seek healing in Arles.

This troubled period saw the inclusion of Trier in the sphere of the Rhine Franks based in Cologne and the flight of Count Arbogast in 485/486 to Chartres, as well as the victory of Clovis over the Alamanni in the Battle of Tolbiac in 496/497. The large number of bishops named around these years also points to disturbed times.

This bishop should not be confused with Saint Maximinus of Trier (d. c.346).

Titles of the Great Christian Church
| Preceded by Modestus of Trier | Maximianus of Trier; 479 – 499 | Succeeded by Fibicius of Treves |
