= Udo (archbishop of Trier) =

Archbishop of Trier from 1066 to 1078

Udo of Nellenburg
- Archbishop of Trier
- Born: unknown
- Died: 11 November 1078; Tübingen
- Burial: Trier Cathedral
- House: Nellenburg
- Father: Eberhard of Nellenburg
- Mother: Ida

Udo of Nellenburg (c. 1030 – 11 November 1078) was the Archbishop of Trier from 1066 until his death. He was an important mediator during the height of the Investiture Controversy.

== Biography ==
Udo was born into the noble house of Nellenburg, a house of hereditary counts in Swabia. He was son of Count Eberhard of Nellenburg and his wife Ida, whose origin and lineage is unknown. He grew up with five brothers and with the succession secured he started a career in the church and ended up in Trier at some point.

After the murder of Archbishop Conrad of Trier 1 June 1066, the cathedral chapter elected Udo, one of their members, to replace him. He was consecrated in 1067.

Udo became a leading German voice in the campaign of Pope Alexander II against simony. Beginning in 1075, he became involved in the campaign against lay investiture being waged by Pope Gregory VII against the Emperor Henry IV. He was looked upon as a mediator in the dispute. He was, however, unable to maintain the peace, but still worked at a resolution. In August 1077, he negotiated a reconciliation between emperor and pope and maintained his own good terms with the Holy See. In March 1078, he received a letter from the pope asking him to work further for the establishment of peace.

Udo died 11 November 1078 at the siege of Tübingen in the imperial army camp. He was eventually buried in Trier Cathedral, the first archbishop to be buried there.

== Sources ==
- Kraus, Franz Xaver (1895). Udo, Erzbischof von Trier (in German). Leipzig: Duncker & Humblot. pp. 129–131.
- Hils, Kurt (1967). "Die Grafen von Nellenburg und der Hegau im 11. Jahrhundert" [The Counts of Nellenburg and the Hegau in the 11th century] (PDF). Hegau (in German). 12 (23/24): 7–25.

Catholic Church titles
Preceded by Conrad of Pfullingen	Bishop of Trier; 1066–1078	Succeeded by Egilbert of Rothenburg
