= Johannes von Helmont =

Roman Catholic prelate

Most Reverend Johannes von Helmont
- Auxiliary Bishop Emeritus of Trier
- Church: Catholic Church
- Diocese: Diocese of Trier
- In office: 1508–1517

Orders
- Consecration: 7 Jul 1508

Personal details
- Died: 9 November 1519 Trier, Germany

Johannes von Helmont, O.S.B. (died 1519) was a Roman Catholic prelate who served as Auxiliary Bishop of Trier (1508–1517).

== Biography ==
Johannes von Helmont was ordained a priest in the Order of Saint Benedict. On 7 February 1508, he was appointed during the papacy of Pope Julius II as Auxiliary Bishop of Trier. On 7 July 1508, he was consecrated bishop. He served as Auxiliary Bishop of Trier until his resignation in July 1517. He died on 9 November 1519.
