= Iamblichus of Trier =

5th-century bishop

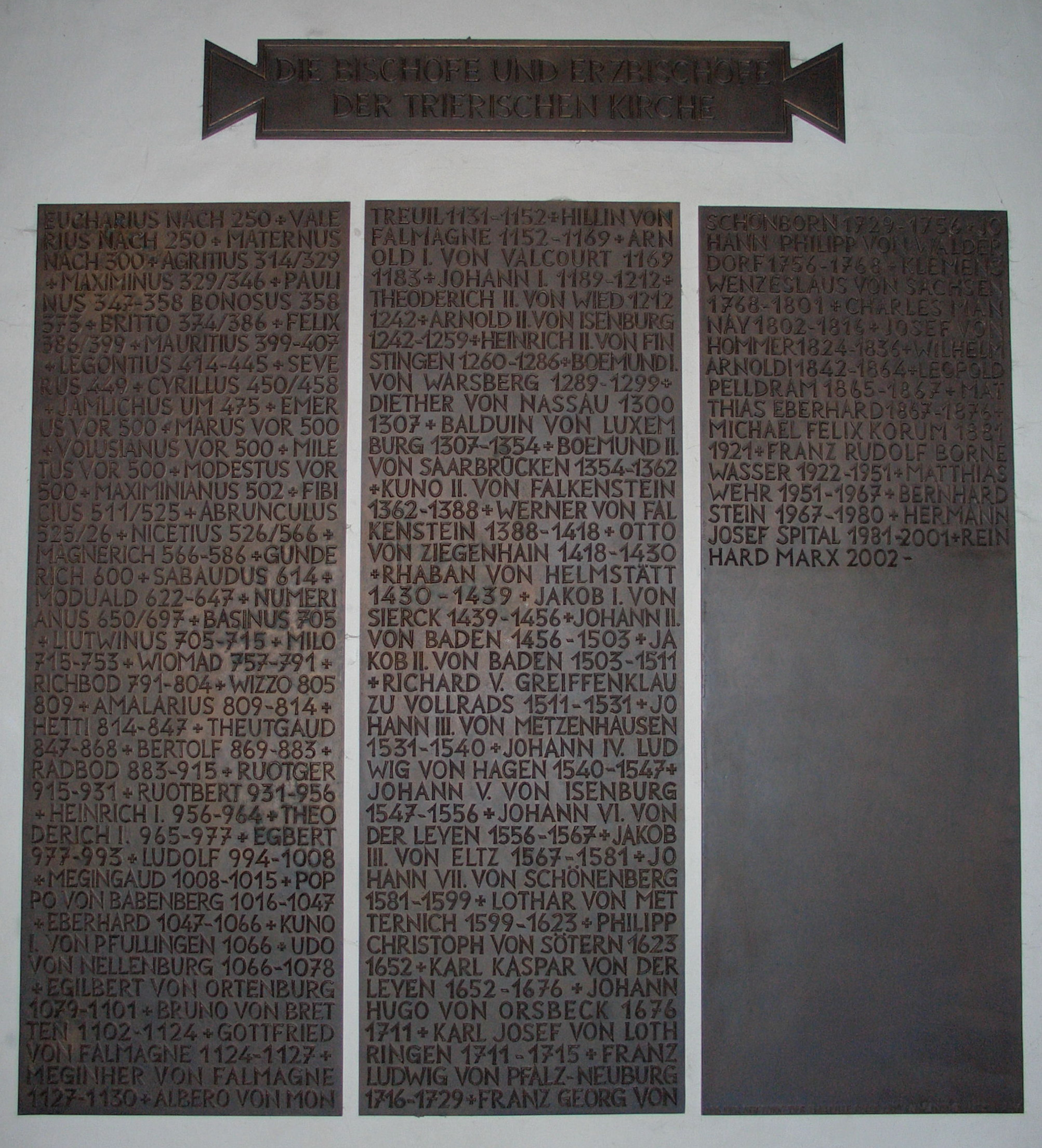
Tabula Episcoporum Trevirensium

Iamblichus of Trier also known as Jamblichus or Jamblychus was a 5th-century bishop of Trier from 475/76.

He is attested in an inscription found in Chalon-sur-Saône. There seems to be no doubt about his historicity, although records from his time are scant due to the transition from the Roman Empire to Frankish rule.
