= Wermad =

Bishop of Trier

- Bishop of Trier
- Church: Catholic Church
- Diocese: Electorate of Trier
- In office: 758/757–791

Personal details
- Born: Unknown
- Died: 8 November 791

Wermad, Wiomad, Weomad, or Wiemad (Latin: Weomadus or Wiomagus) (died 791) was the Bishop of Trier from 757/8 until his death. He accompanied Charlemagne on his conquest of Italy in 774 and in his campaigns against the Avars. He was granted full autonomy over his diocese and the properties of the church of Trier received immunity from the jurisdiction of the local counts.

== Sources ==
- Bauer, Thomas (1998). "Weomad." Biographisch-Bibliographisches Kirchenlexikon, XIII, 767–772.
