= Diocese of Trier =

Latin Catholic territory in Germany

Coordinates: 49°45′22″N 6°38′35″E

Diocese of Trier or Treves Dioecesis Trevirensis Bistum Trier

Catholic
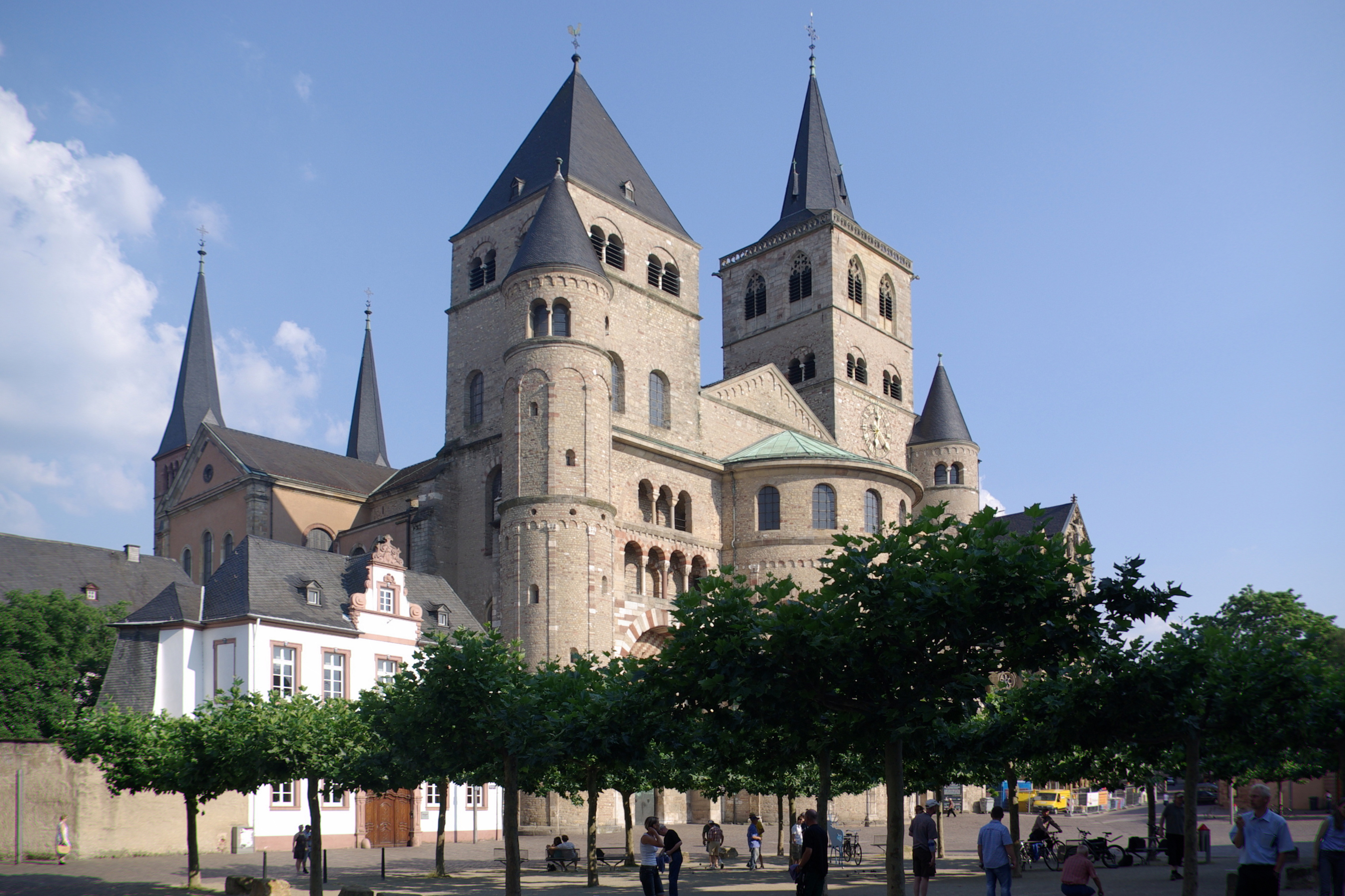
- Trier Cathedral

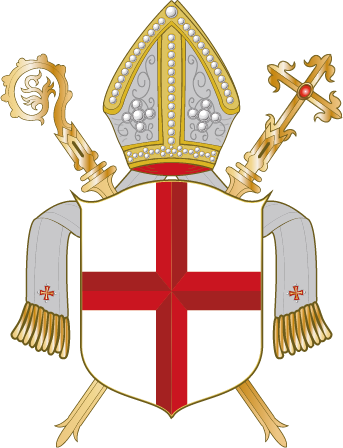
- Coat of arms

Location
- Country: Germany
- Ecclesiastical province: Cologne

Statistics
- Area: 12,870 km^{2} (4,970 sq mi)
- Population: Total; Catholics: (as of 2010); 2,468,000; 1,504,500 (61%)

Information
- Denomination: Catholic Church
- Sui iuris church: Latin Church
- Rite: Roman Rite
- Established: 1st Century
- Cathedral: Cathedral of Trier
- Patron saint: Mary, Mother of God; Saint Matthias

Current leadership
- Pope: Leo XIV
- Bishop: Stephan Ackermann; Bishop of Trier
- Metropolitan Archbishop: Rainer Maria Woelki
- Auxiliary Bishops: Robert Brahm, Jörg Michael Peters

Map
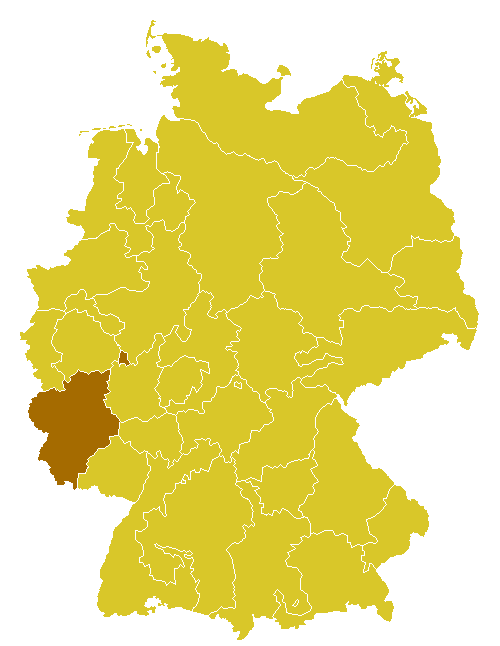

Website
- bistum-trier.de

The Diocese of Trier (Latin: Dioecesis Trevirensis), in English historically also known as Treves (/triːvz/) from French Trèves, is a Latin Catholic ecclesiastical territory or diocese of the Catholic Church in Germany. When it was the archbishopric and Electorate of Trier, it was one of the most important states of the Holy Roman Empire, both as an ecclesiastical principality and as a diocese of the church. Unlike the other Rhenish dioceses—including Mainz and Cologne–Trier was the former Roman provincial capital of Augusta Treverorum. Given its status, Trier has continuously been an episcopal see since Roman times and is one of the oldest dioceses in all of Germany. The diocese was elevated to an archdiocese in the time of Charlemagne and was the metropolitan for the dioceses of Metz, Toul, and Verdun. After the victory of Napoleon Bonaparte of France, the archdiocese was lowered to a diocese and is now a suffragan in the ecclesiastical province of the Archdiocese of Cologne. The diocesan cathedral is the Cathedral of Saint Peter. The Cathedral Chapter retains the right to elect the bishop, rather than selection by papal appointment.

== History ==
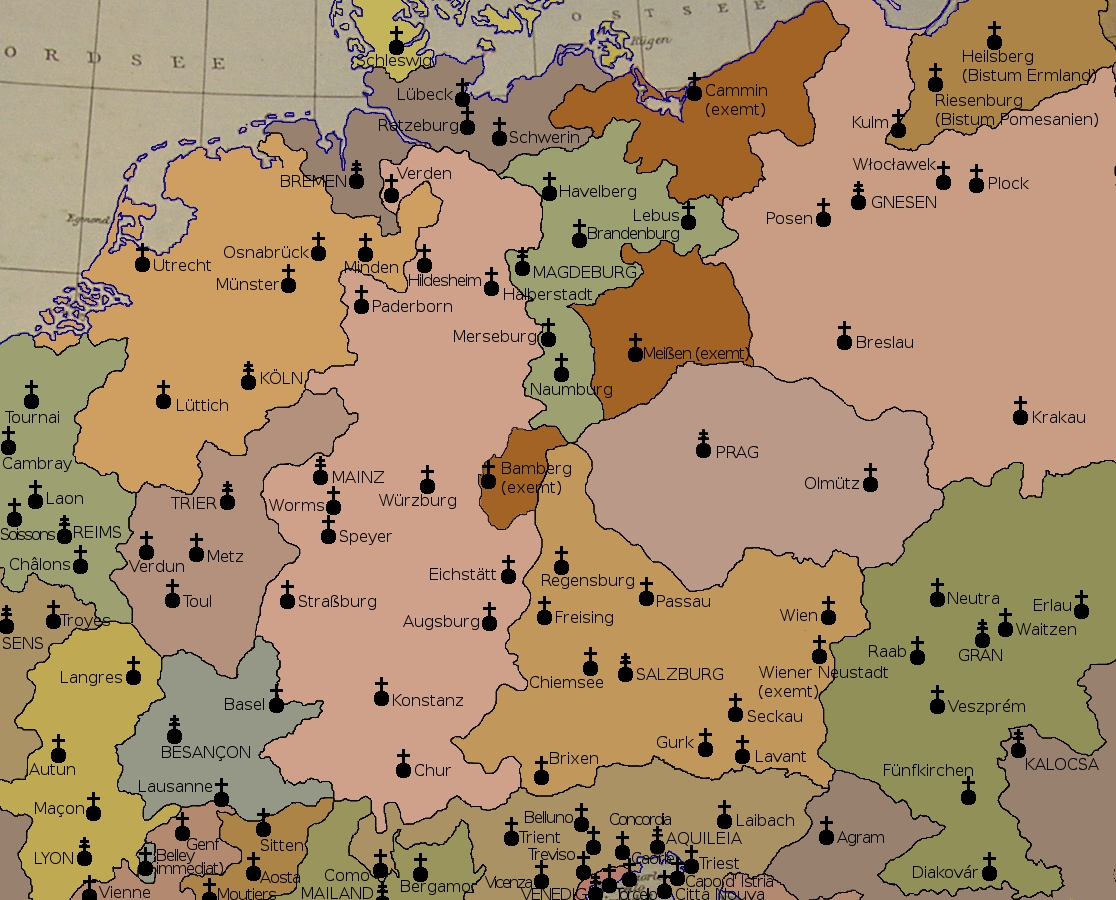
The archdiocese of Trier in 1500

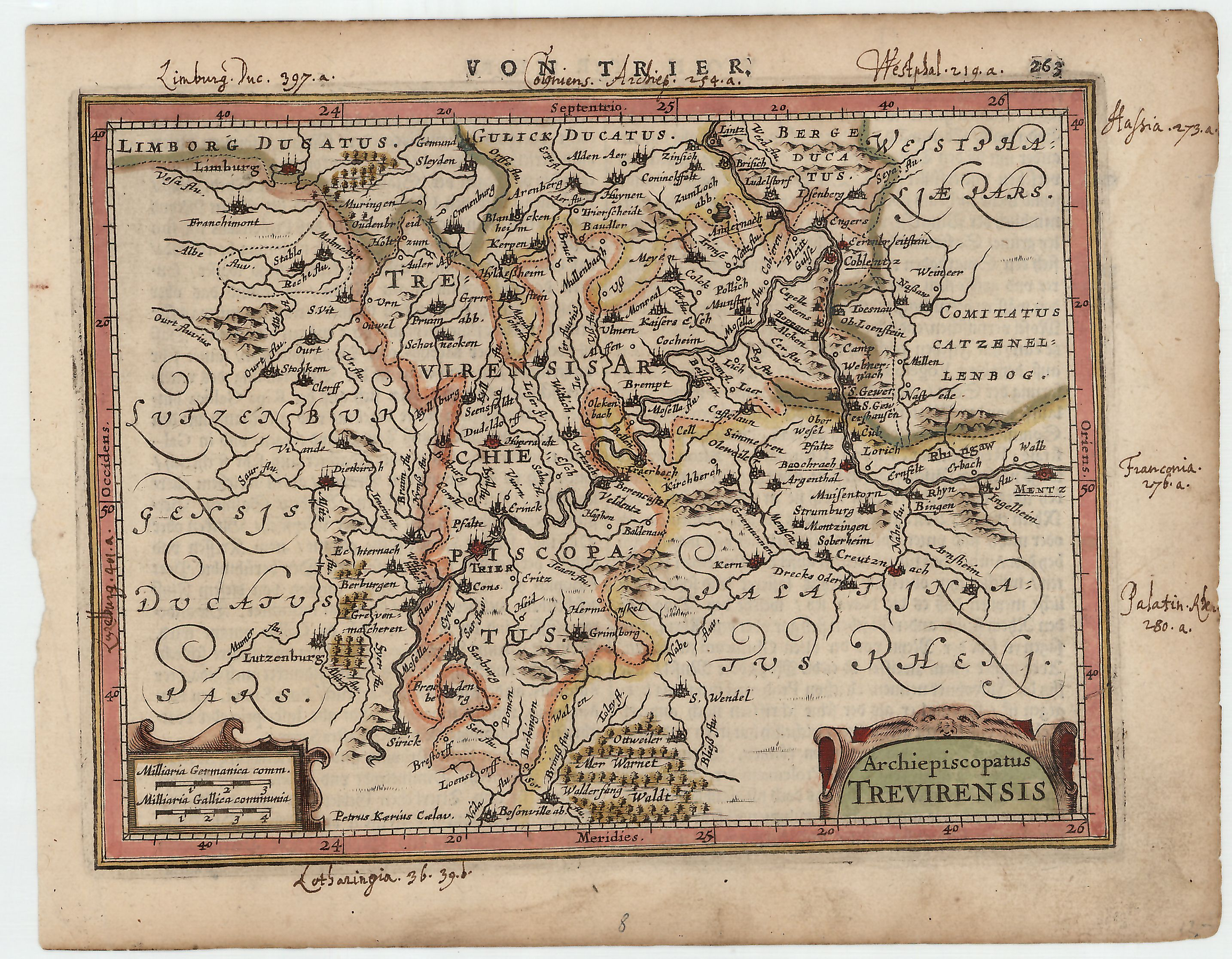
Map of the territory of the archdiocese of Trier in 1651

The bishops of Trier were already virtually independent territorial magnates in Merovingian times. In 772 Charlemagne granted Bishop Wiomad complete immunity from the jurisdiction of the ruling count for all the churches and monasteries, as well as villages and castles that belonged to the Church of St. Peter at Trier. In his will he also elevated the diocese to the Archdiocese of Trier, with suffragans on both sides of the Rhine. This arrangement lasted over a thousand years.

In Early Modern times, the archdiocese of Trier still encompassed territory along the Moselle River between Trier, near the French border, and Koblenz on the Rhine. The Archbishop of Trier, as holder of an imperial office was traditionally an Imperial Elector of the German king. The purely honorary office of Archchancellor of Gaul arose in the 13th century. In this context that was taken to mean the Kingdom of Burgundy-Arles, technically from 1242 and permanently from 1263, and nominally until 1803. Arles along with Germany and Italy was one of the three component kingdoms of the Empire.

The last elector removed to Koblenz in 1786. From 1795, the territories of the Archbishopric on the left bank of the Rhine — which is to say almost all of them — were under French occupation, and were annexed in 1801 and a separate bishopric established (later assuming control of the whole diocese in 1803). In 1803, what was left of the Archbishopric was secularized and annexed by the Princes of Nassau.

== Bishops ==
=== Before 1000 ===
- Eucharius c. 250
- Valerius c. 250
- Maternus c. 300
- Auspicius of Trier uncertain
- Agricius (Agrippinus) 327–335
- Maximinus 335–346
- Paulinus 347–358
- Bonosus of Trier 359–365
- Veteranius of Trier 365–384
- Britto of Trier 384–386 (?)
- Felix 384–398
- Mauritius II of Trier 398–407
- Leontius of Trier 407–409
- Auctor II 409–427
- Severus of Trier 428–455
- Cyrillus of Trier 455–457
- Iamblichus of Trier 457–458
- Evemerus 458–461
- Marcus II 461–465
- Volusianus of Trier 465–469
- Miletius 469–476
- Modestus 476–479
- Maximianus of Trier 479–499
- Fibicius 500–526
- Aprunculus (Aprunentius) 526–527
- Nicetius 527–566
- Rusticus II 566–573
- Magnerich 573–596
- Gunderich 596–600
- Sibald 600–626
- Modoald 626–645
- Numerianus 645–665
- Hildulf 665–671, d. 707
- Basinus 671–697 d. 706 ?
- Leudwinus 697–718
- Milo 718–758
- Wermad 758–791
- Richbod 791–804, first archbishop
- Waso 804–809
- Amalhar 809–814
- Hetto 814–847
- Dietgold 847–868
- Bartholf von Wetterau 869–883
- Radbod 883–915
- Rudgar 915–930
- Rotbert 930–956
- Henry I 956–964
- Dietrich I 965–977
- Egbert 977–993
- Ludolf 994–1008

=== 1000–1200 ===
- contested 1008–1015: Adalbero (elected) versus Meingaud (royal choice)
- Poppo von Babenberg 1016–1047
- Eberhard 1047–1066
- Kuno I von Wetterau (Conrad) 1066–1066
- Udo of Nellenburg 1066–1078
- Egilbert of Rothenburg, 1079–1101
- Bruno 1101–1124
- Gottfrid 1124–1127
- Meginher 1127–1130
- Albero de Montreuil 1131–1152
- Hillin of Falmagne 1152–1169
- Arnold I of Vaucourt 1169–1183
- Folmar of Karden 1183–1189
- Rudolf of Wied 1183–1189 (in opposition)

=== 1200–1500 ===
==== Archbishop-Electors of Trier ====
- John I 1189–1212
- Theodoric II 1212–42
- Arnold II von Isenburg 1242–59
- Heinrich I von Finstingen 1260–86
- Bohemond I von Warnesberg 1286–99
- Diether von Nassau 1300–07
- Heinrich II von Virneburg 1300–06 (in opposition)
- Baldwin von Luxemburg 1307–54
- Bohemond II von Saarbrücken 1354–61
- Kuno II von Falkenstein 1362–88
- Werner von Falkenstein 1388–1418
- Otto von Ziegenhain 1418–30
- Rhaban von Helmstadt 1430–38
- Jakob von Sierck † (19 May 1439 Elected – 28 May 1456 Died)
- Johann Markgraf von Baden † (21 Jun 1456 Elected – 9 Feb 1502 Died)

=== 1500–1800 ===
- Jakob Markgraf von Baden † (9 Feb 1503 Succeeded – 27 Apr 1511 Died)
- Richard von Greiffenclau zu Vollrads † (15 May 1511 Elected – 13 Mar 1531 Died)
- Johann von Metzenhausen † (27 Mar 1531 Elected – 22 Jul 1540 Died)
- Johann Ludwig von Hagen † (9 Aug 1540 Elected – 23 Mar 1547 Died)
- Johann von Isenburg † (20 Apr 1547 Elected – 18 Feb 1556 Died)
- Johann von der Leyen † (25 Apr 1556 Elected – 10 Feb 1567 Died)
- Jakob von Eltz † (7 Apr 1567 Elected – 4 Jun 1581 Died)
- Johann von Schönenberg † (31 Jul 1581 Elected – 1 May 1599 Died)
- Lothar von Metternich † (7 Aug 1599 Elected – 17 Sep 1623 Died)
- Philipp Christoph Reichsritter von Sötern † (25 Sep 1623 Elected– 7 Feb 1652 Died)
- Karl Kaspar Reichsfreiherr von Leyen-Hohengeroldseck † (7 Feb 1652 Succeeded – 1 Jun 1676 Died)
- Johann Hugo von Orsbeck † (1 Jun 1676 Succeeded – 6 Jan 1711 Died)
- Karl Joseph Ignaz Herzog von Lothringen † (24 Sep 1710 Elected – 4 Dec 1715 Died)
- Franz Ludwig Pfalzgraf am Rhein zu Neuburg † (20 Feb 1716 Elected – 3 Mar 1729 Resigned)
- Franz Georg Reichsfgraf von Schönborn † (2 May 1729 Elected – 18 Jan 1756 Died)
- Johann Philipp Reichsgraf von Waldendorff † (18 Jan 1756 Succeeded – 12 Jan 1768 Died)
- Klemens Wenzeslaus Herzog von Sachsen † (10 Feb 1768 Elected – 29 Nov 1801 Resigned)

=== After 1800 ===
==== Bishops of Trier ====
- Charles Mannay † (5 Jul 1802 Elected – 9 Oct 1816 Resigned)
- Josef von Hommer † (3 May 1824 Elected – 11 Nov 1836 Died)
- Wilhelm Arnoldi † (21 Jun 1842 Elected – 7 Jan 1864 Died)
- Leopold Pelldram † (29 Dec 1864 Elected – 3 May 1867 Died)
- Matthias Eberhard † (16 Jul 1867 Elected – 30 May 1876 Died)
- Michael Felix Korum † (12 Aug 1881 Elected – 4 Dec 1921 Died)
- Franz Rudolf Bornewasser † (27 Feb 1922 Elected – 20 Dec 1951 Died)
- Matthias Wehr † (20 Dec 1951 Succeeded – 19 Nov 1966 Retired)
- Bernhard Stein † (13 Apr 1967 Elected – 5 Sep 1980 Retired)
- Hermann Josef Spital † (24 Feb 1981 Elected – 15 Jan 2001 Retired)
- Reinhard Marx (20 Dec 2001 Elected – 30 Nov 2007 Translated to become Archbishop of Munich and Freising)
- Stephan Ackermann (8 Apr 2009 Elected – )

=== Auxiliary bishops ===
- Nicolas Arlon, O. Carm. (1344–)
- Joannes Franqueloy de Vico, O.P. (1400–1452)
- Gerhard, O.F.M. (1429–1456)
- Hubert Yffz (de Rommersdorf), O. Praem. (1450–1483)
- Johann von Eindhoven, C.R.S.A. (1483–1508)
- Johannes von Helmont, O.S.B. (1508–1517)
- Johannes Enen (1517–1519)
- Nikolaus Schienen (1519–1556)
- Gregor Virneburg (1557–1578)
- Peter Binsfeld (1580–1598)
- Gregor Helfenstein (1599–1632)
- Otto von Senheim, (Johann Theodor von Senheim) O.P. (1633–1662)
- Johannes Holler (1663–1671)
- Johann Heinrich von Anethan (1676–1680)
- Maximilian Burmann (1682–1685)
- Johannes Petrus Verhorst (1687–1708)
- Johann Matthias von Eyss (1710–1729)
- Lothar Friedrich von Nalbach (1730–1748)
- Johann Nikolaus (Febronius) von Hontheim (1748–1790)
- Jean-Marie Cuchot d’Herbain (1778–1794)
- Johann Michael Josef von Pidoll de Quitenbach (1794–1802)
- Johann Heinrich Milz (1825–1833)
- Wilhelm Arnold Günther, O. Praem. (1834–1843)
- Johann Georg Müller (1844–1847)
- Godehard Braun (1849–1861)
- Matthias Eberhard (1862–1867 Appointed, Bishop of Trier)
- Johann Jakob Kraft (1868–1884)
- Heinrich Feiten (1887–1892)
- Karl Ernst Schrod (1894–1914)
- Anton Mönch (1915–1935)
- Albert Maria Fuchs (1935–1944)
- Heinrich Metzroth (1941–1951)
- Bernhard Stein (1944–1967 Appointed, Bishop of Trier)
- Carl Schmidt (1962–1981)
- Karl Heinz Jacoby (1968–1993)
- Alfred Kleinermeilert (1968–2003)
- Leo Schwarz (1982–2006)
- Gehard Jakob (1993–1998)
- Felix Genn (1999–2003, Translated to become Bishop of Essen and later Bishop of Münster)
- Robert Brahm (2003– )
- Jörg Michael Peters (2003– )
- Stephan Ackermann (2006–2009 Appointed, Bishop of Trier)
- Helmut Dieser (2011–2016, Translated, Bishop of Aachen)
- Franz Josef Gebert (2017–2024)

== See also ==
- History of Trier
