= Volusianus of Trier =

Volusianus was bishop of Trier at the end of the 5th century.

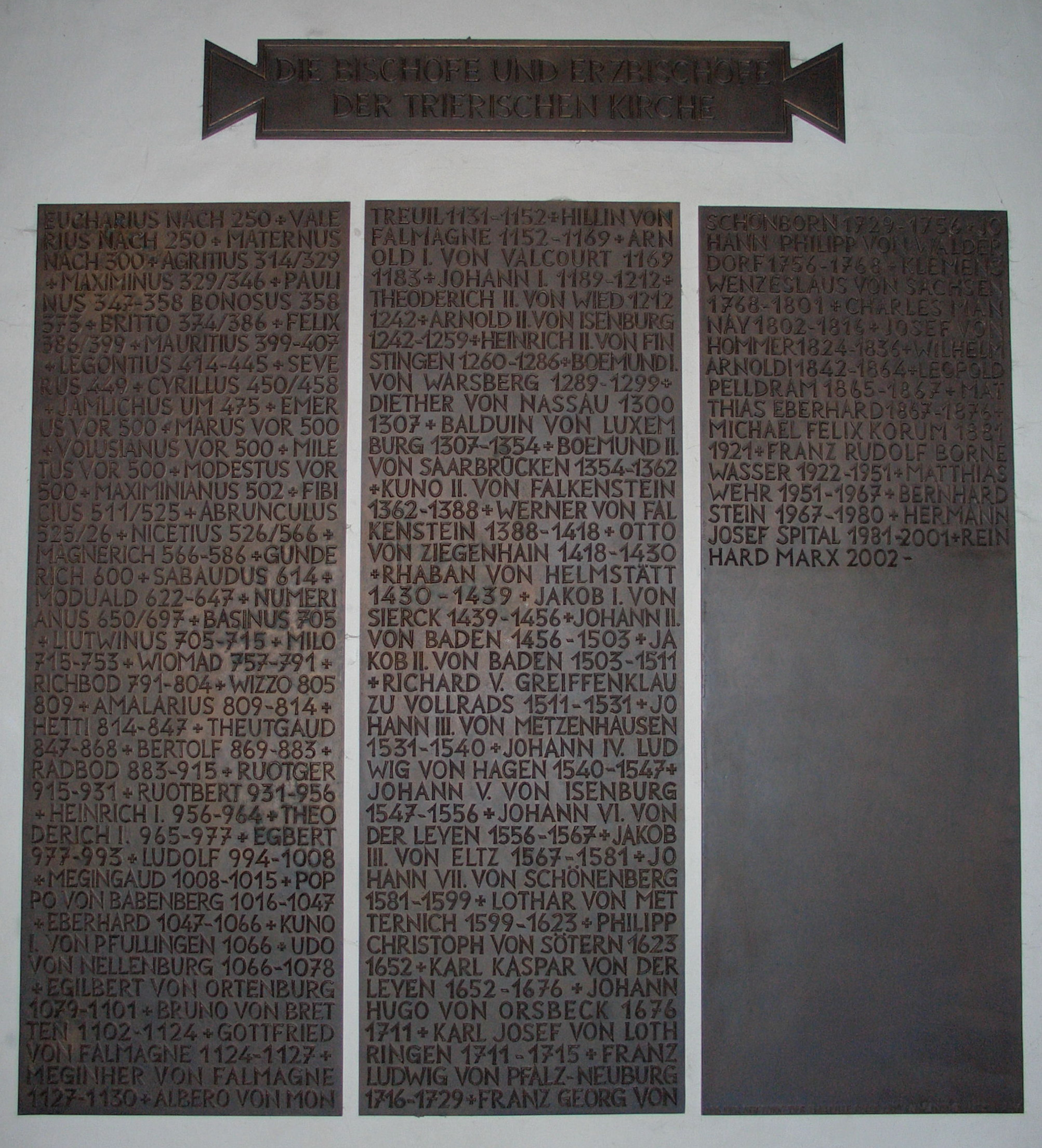
Tabula Episcoporum Trevirensium

Very little is known of his life but he is one of a number of bishops around this time. The rapid succession of bishops named in the late 5th and early 6th centuries indicates the troubled times in the period of transition from the Roman to Frankish rule in Trier, which was itself Frankish by 496.

After a period of crisis for the Christian community some stabilisation had apparently occurred under his predecessors.

Volusianus has been associated with the so-called New Year's Privilege, referring to the grant by Pope Sylvester I (314–335) of certain privileges to the church in Trier, although some question the authenticity of such a grant.

Where Volusianus was buried is unknown.

Titles of the Great Christian Church
| Preceded by Marcus II | Archbishop of Trier; 465 – 469 | Succeeded by Miletius of Trier |
