= Landesmuseum =

Landesmuseum (‘state museum’) may refer to a museum of a state of Germany or a state of Austria:

- Hessischen Landesmuseen:
  - Hessisches Landesmuseum Darmstadt
  - Hessian State Museum, Kassel
  - Museum Wiesbaden
  - Keltenwelt am Glauberg
  - Saalburg
- Landesmuseum Mainz, Germany
- Landesmuseum Württemberg, Germany
- Landesmuseum Hannover, Germany
- Pomerania State Museum, Greifswald, Germany
- Rheinisches Landesmuseum, Rhineland, Germany
  - Rheinisches Landesmuseum Bonn
  - Rheinisches Landesmuseum Trier
- State Museum for Work and Technology, Mannheim, Germany
- Liechtenstein National Museum, Vaduz, Liechtenstein
- Swiss National Museum, Zürich, Switzerland
- Universalmuseum Joanneum, Styria, Austria (formerly the Landesmuseum Joanneum)
- vorarlberg museum (former Vorarlberger Landesmuseum), Bregenz, Austria
- Westphalian State Museum of Art and Cultural History, Münster, Germany
