= Rheinisches Landesmuseum =

The Rheinische Landesmuseum (the Rhineland State Museum, or the State Museum of the Rhine) may refer to either of two sister museums in the Rhineland:

- Rheinisches Landesmuseum Bonn
- Rheinisches Landesmuseum Trier

Das Rheinische becomes Rheinisches when used without a definite article (a strong inflection).
