= Rheinisches Landesmuseum Trier =

Coordinates: 49.7513°N 6.6441°E

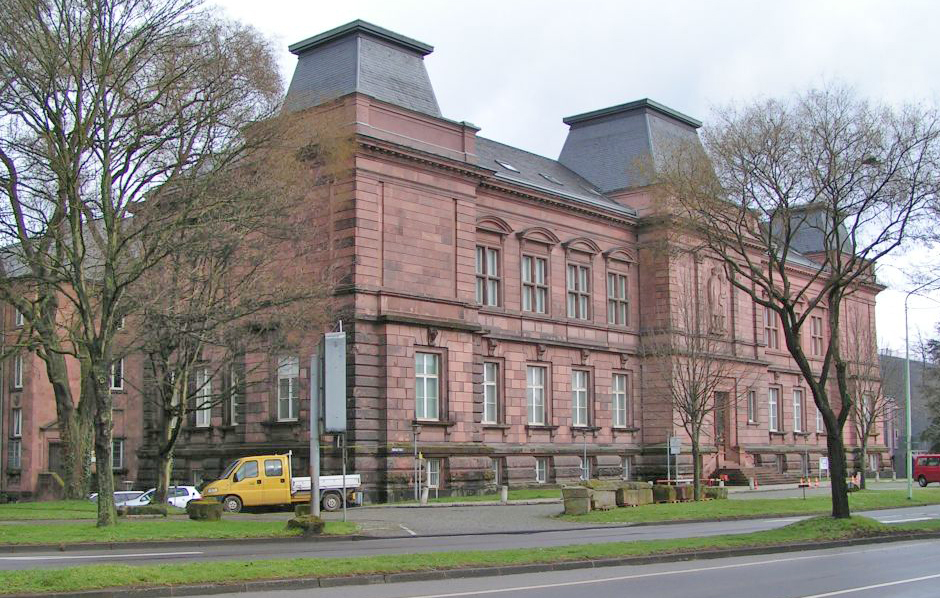
- Established: 1877
- Location: Trier, Weimarer Allee 1
- Type: museum of archaeology, antiquities and art
- Collection size: 4000 m² (permanent exhibition); 2000 m² (temporary exhibition)
- Director: Marcus Reuter
- Website: landesmuseum-trier.de/en/home.html

The Rheinische Landesmuseum Trier is an archaeological museum in Trier, Germany. The collection stretches from prehistory through the Roman period, the Middle Ages to the Baroque era with a strong emphasis on the Roman past of Augusta Treverorum, Germany's oldest city. Its collections of (local) Roman sculptures, Roman mosaics and frescos are among the best in Germany (along with those of the Römisch-Germanisches Museum in Cologne, the Rheinisches Landesmuseum Bonn and the Römisch-Germanisches Zentralmuseum in Mainz).

== History ==
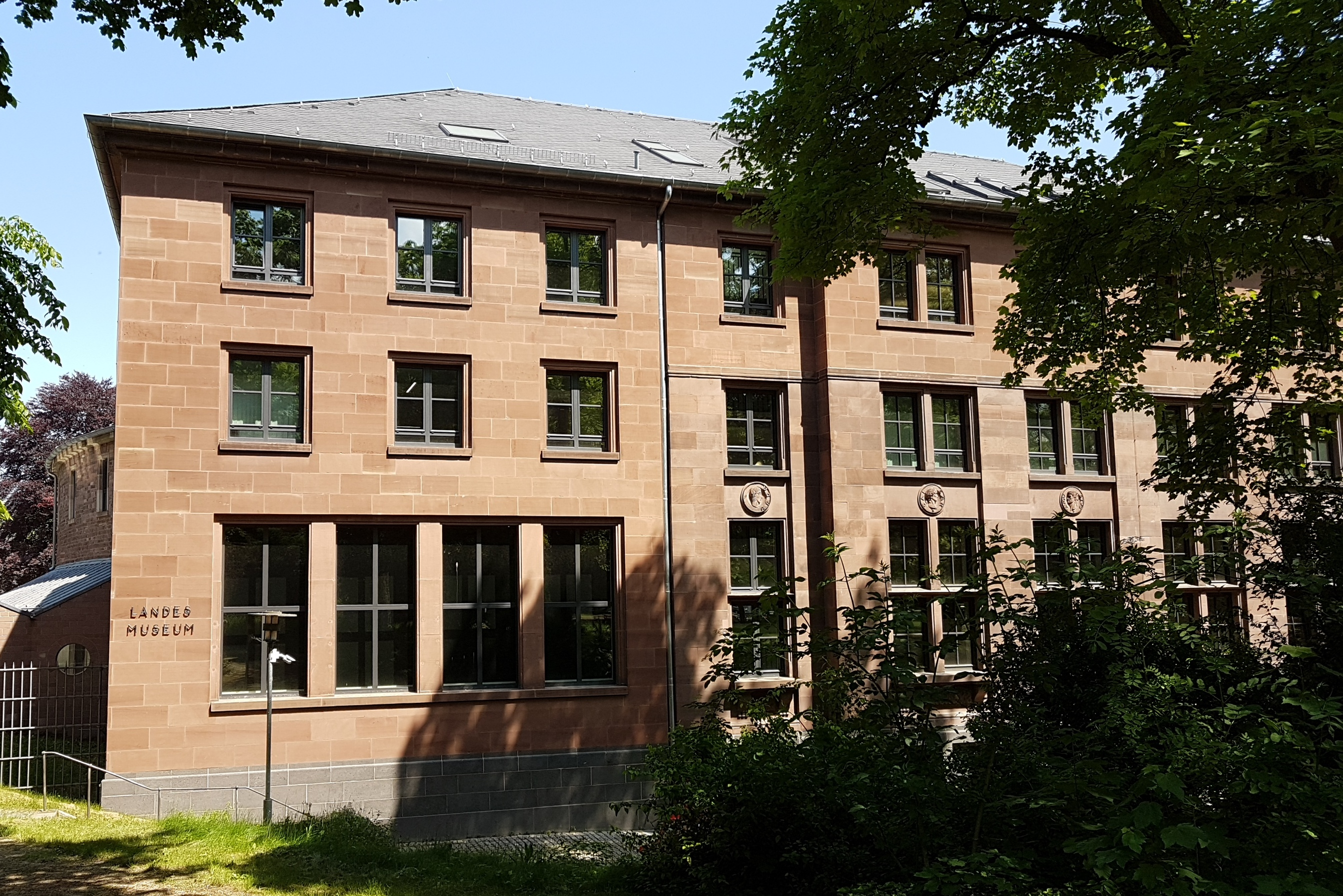
South wing of 1926, renewed in the 1950

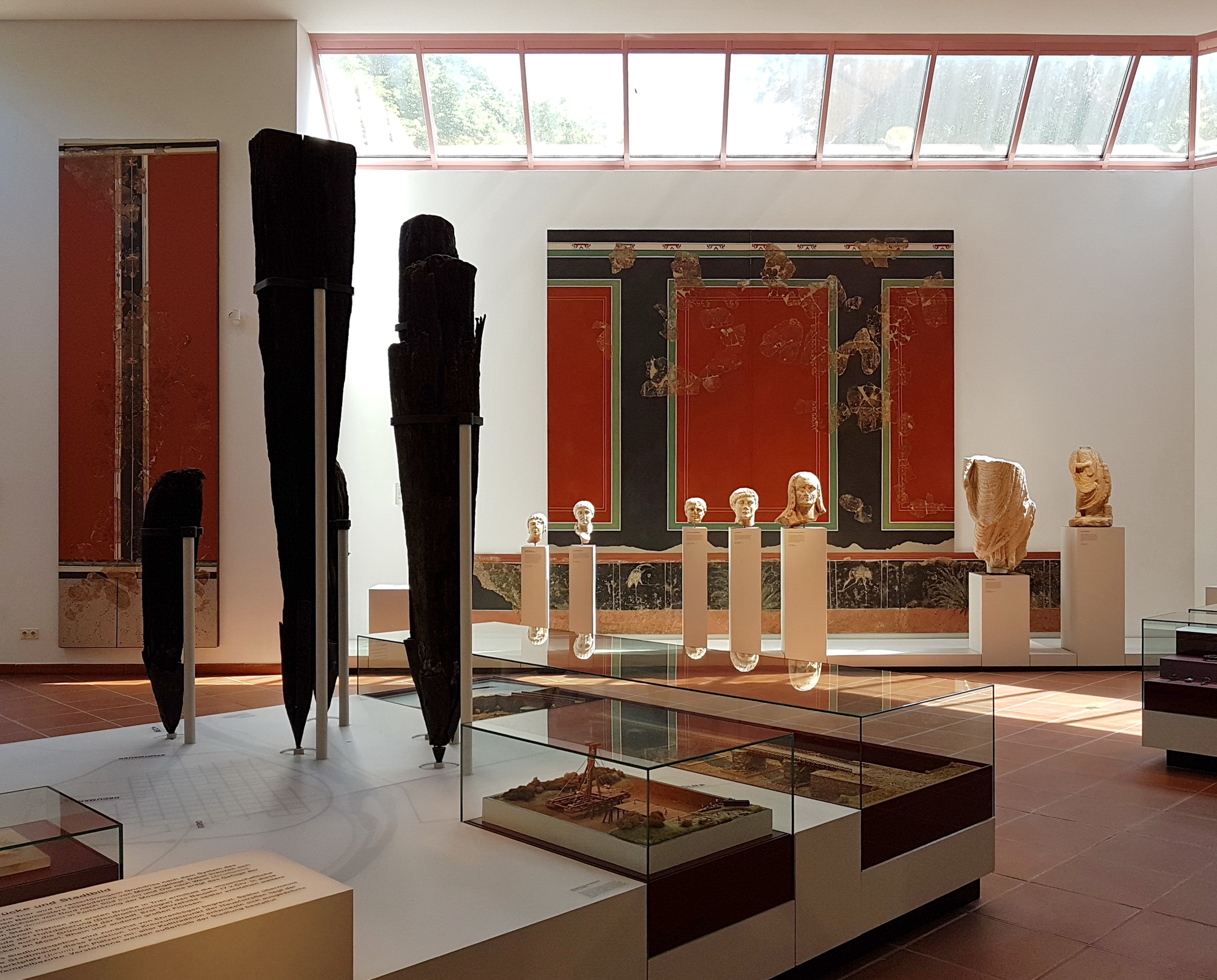
Roman archaeology

The museum was founded in 1877 as the Provincial Museum of the Prussian Rhine Province (Provinzialmuseum der preußischen Rheinprovinz), of which the Rheinisches Landesmuseum Bonn was also part. The first director was the archaeologist Felix Hettner (1877–1902).

In 1885–89 a proper museum building was built at the edge of the palace garden of the Electoral Palace, just outside the Roman wall. The architect of the building, rectangular and of red sandstone, was Clemens Guinbert, Landbaurat from Düsseldorf. Guinbert also built the museum in Bonn. In 1904 the building was enlarged with three wings after a design by Carl Hocheder from Munich. In 1925–26 Hocheder's south wing was replaced by a new office wing. In 1945 around 80% of the building was destroyed by bombs. The rebuilding campaign was led by Zahn and was finished in 1958. It left the museum architecturally as a 'watered-down' version of the original designs. In the 1980s a new section was added by the architects Klaus Gauger and Gerhard Dürr from Neustadt an der Weinstraße.

Since 2008 the museum has been managed by the department of Cultural Heritage of the Bundesland Rhineland-Palatinate (Generaldirektion Kulturelles Erbe Rheinland-Pfalz).

From the inception of the museum in 1877, it has been active in the field of archaeological excavations and research. Many of the artifacts in the museum's collection have been excavated by the museum. The radius of its scientific research is the city of Trier and its wider environs, which includes over 10,000 archaeological sites that are already known to exist. The museum publishes two scientific magazines. Since 2006, the Dr. Heinz Cüpper Award is presented, named after a former director.

== Collection ==
The collection consists of artifacts from the Stone Age up to the end of the Ancien Régime, a period of around 200.000 years. Often, the temporary exhibitions will draw on the museum's forte: the Roman era.

A multimedia presentation, "In the Realm of Shadows" (Im Reich der Schatten), takes place in the department of Roman archaeology twice a day. The show attempts to bring back to life the 'dead' objects in the collection, for instance by projecting the original polychrome onto the sculptures.

=== Prehistory ===
In this section some of the oldest tools made by humans in the area can be seen. A highlight is the Trassem gold hoard of around 1600 BC. Many archaeological finds date from the Celtic era, including weapons and jewellery. A scale model explains the complicated structure of a Celtic defence wall (Murus Gallicus).

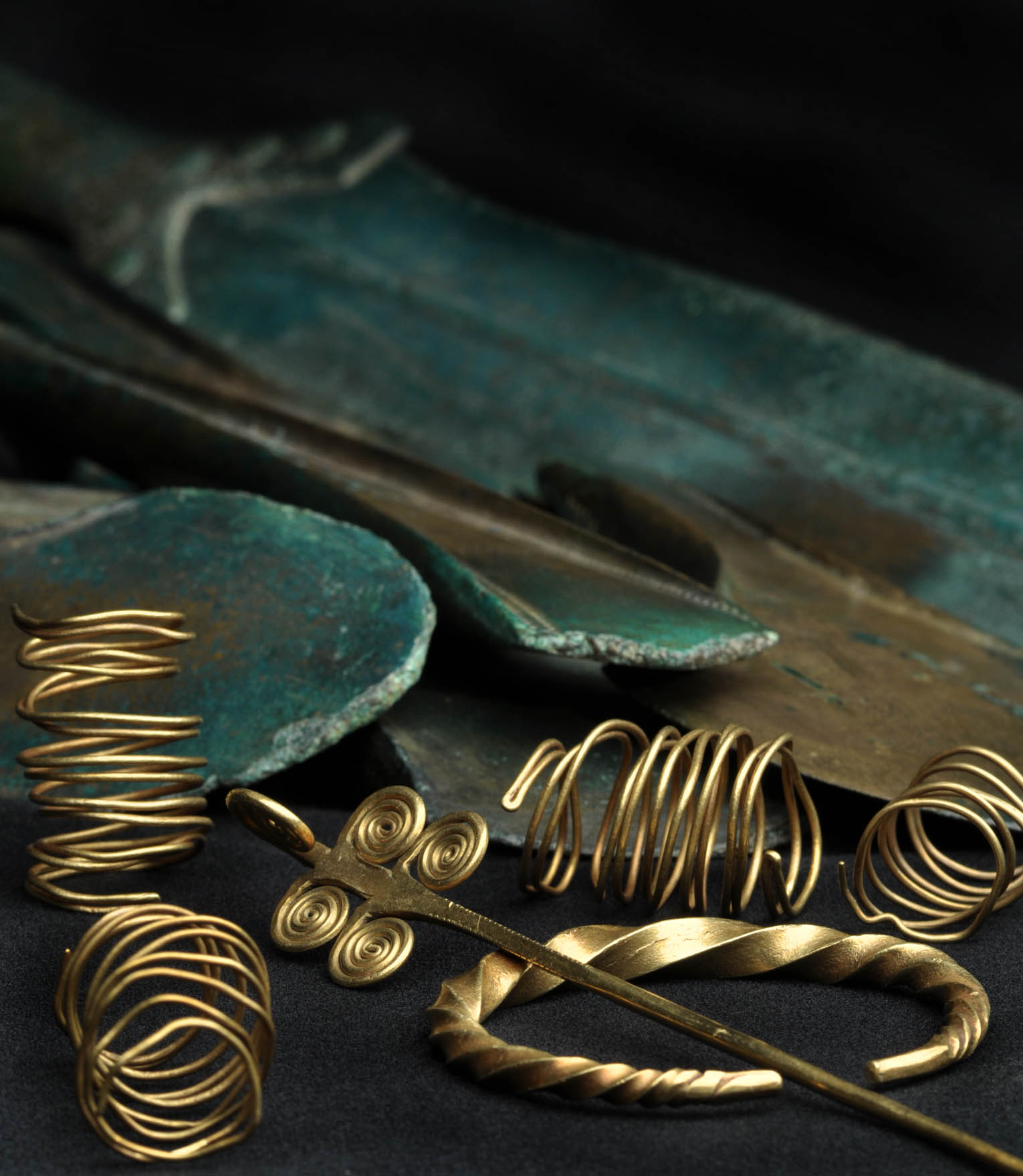
Gold hoard from Trassem

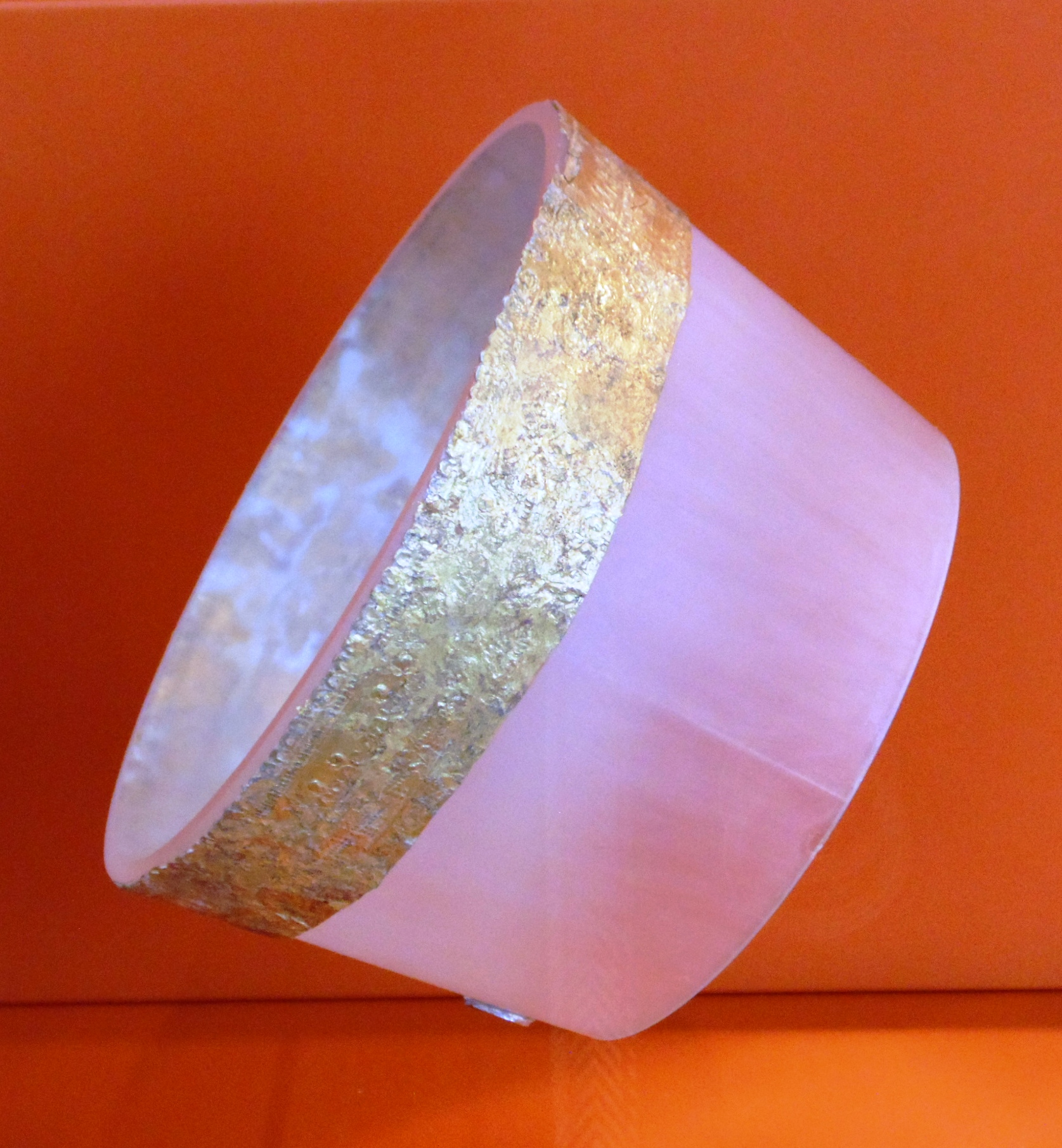
Drinking horn decoration

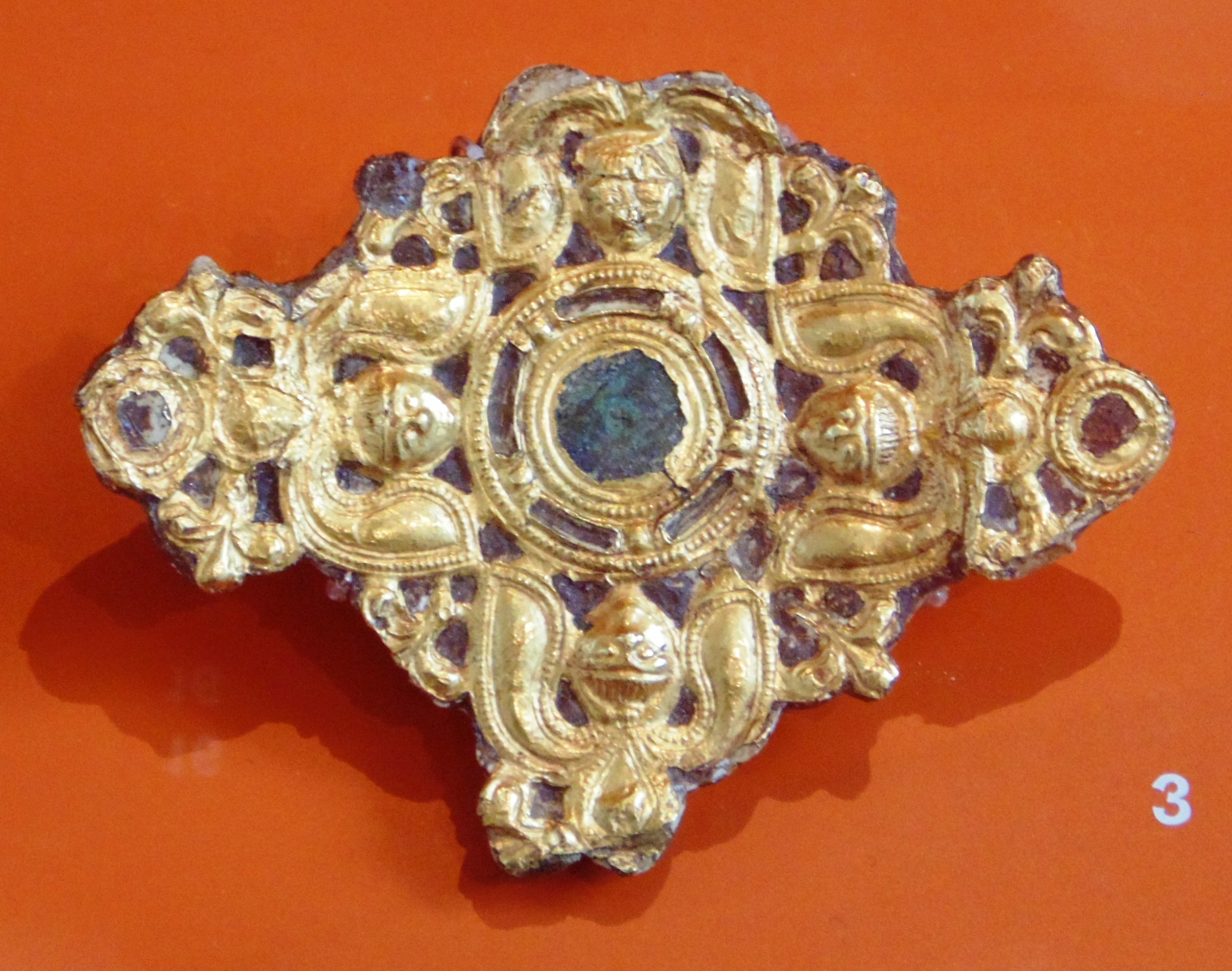
Brooch from Weiskirchen

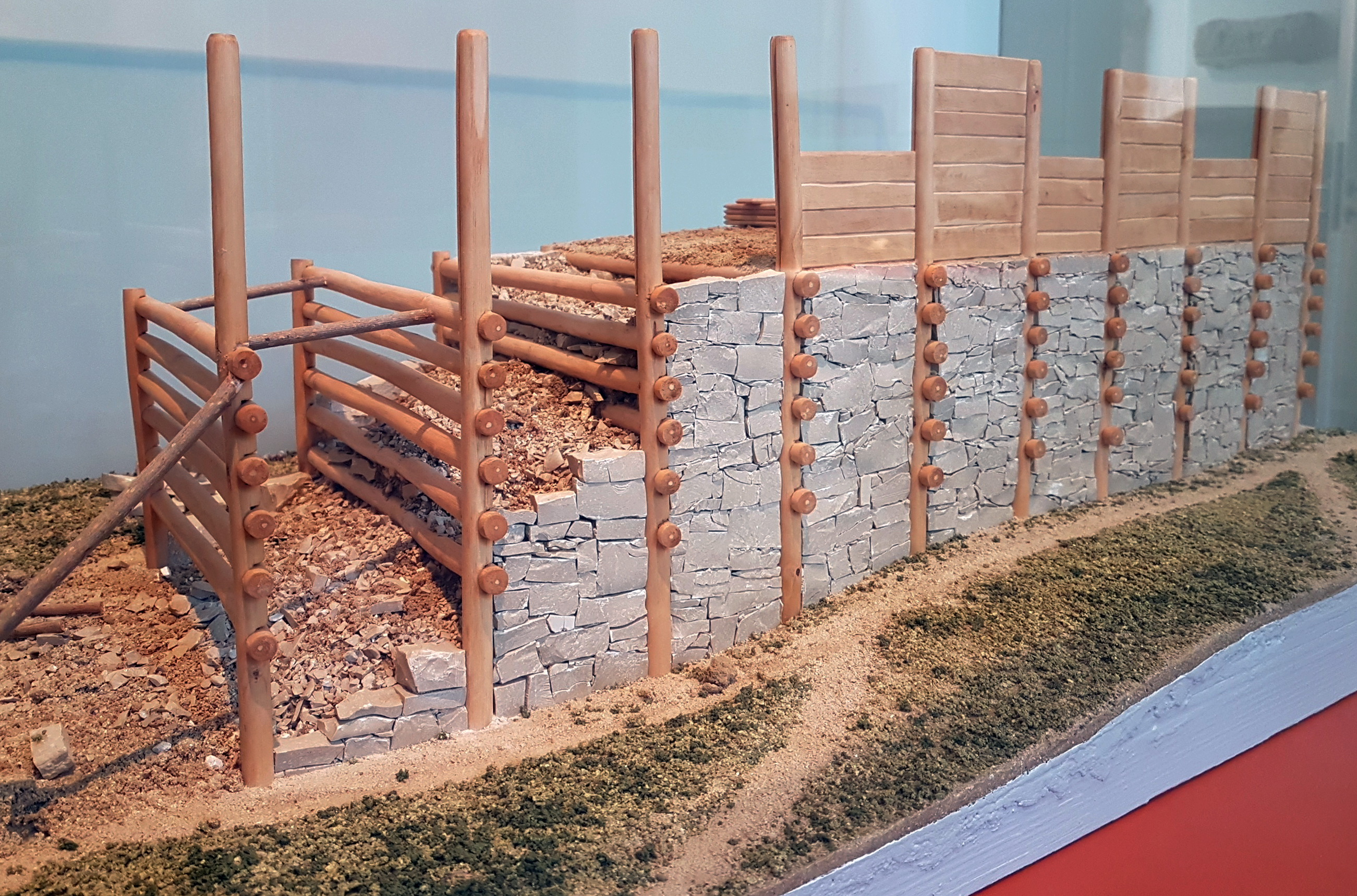
Murus Gallicus model

=== Roman sculptures ===
Roman sculpture takes a prominent place in the collection. A polychromed copy of the 30-meter tall Igel Column (Igeler Säule) from a nearby village fills the museum's courtyard. One of the larger rooms is entirely dedicated to a collection of sculpted grave monuments from Neumagen-Dhron (Noviomagus Treverorum), a Roman army base on the Moselle, a couple of miles downstream of Trier. Among the imposing grave towers it is easy to overlook the "Neumagen Wine Ship", probably a funeral monument of a wine merchant. Many statues and reliefs originate from the city of Trier, for instance from the Imperial Baths, the Barbara Baths, or the Altbachthal tempel complex.

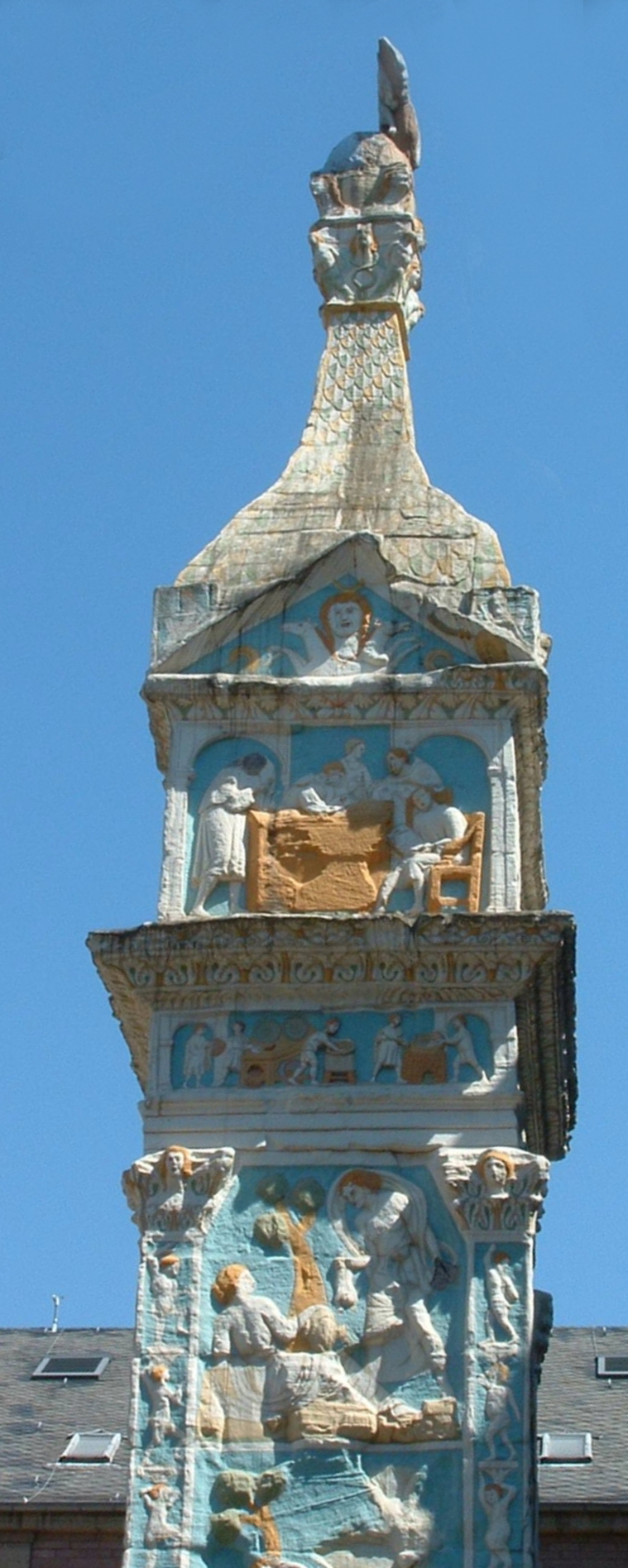
Igel Column (replica)

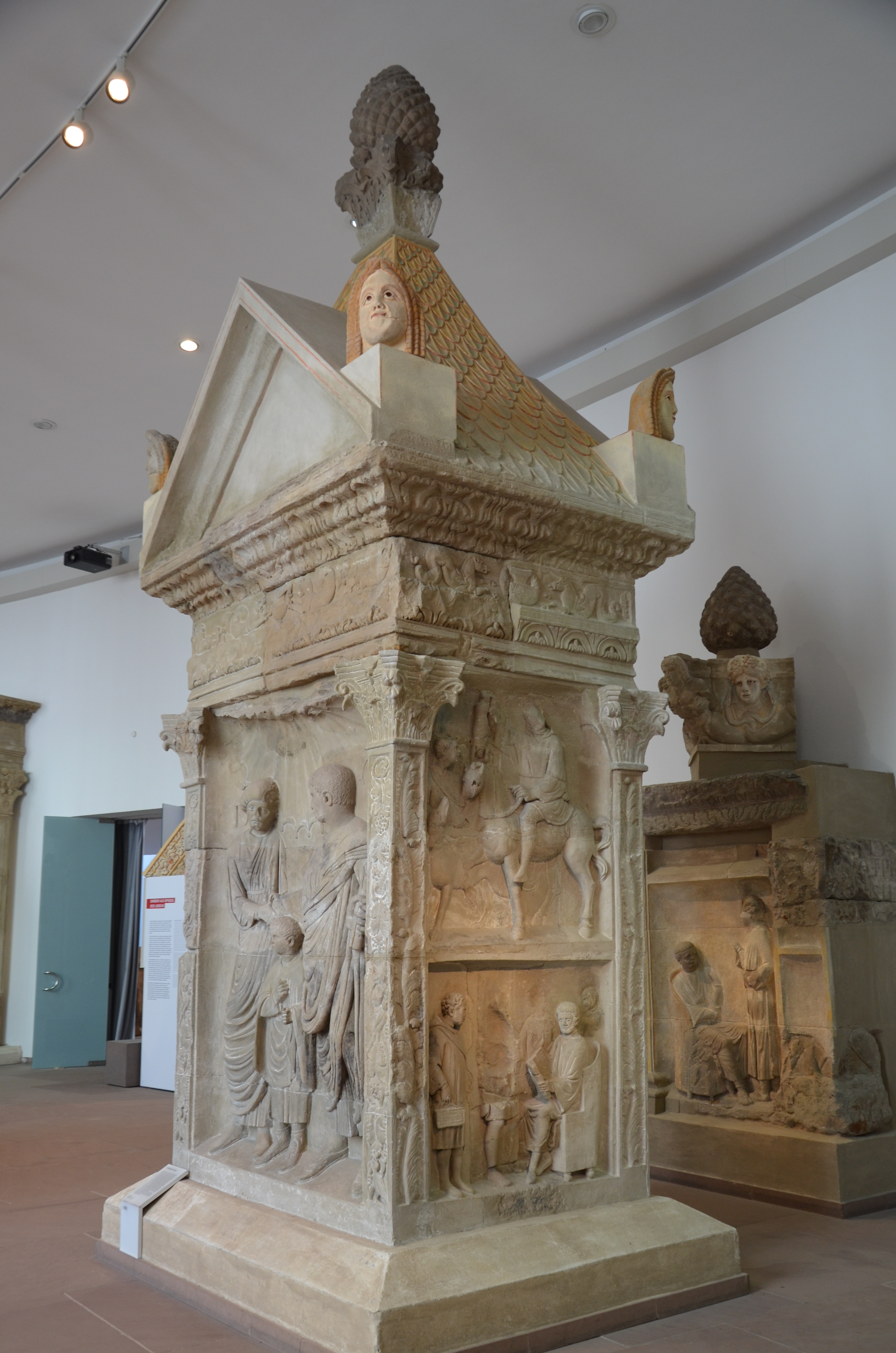
Grave tower from Neumagen

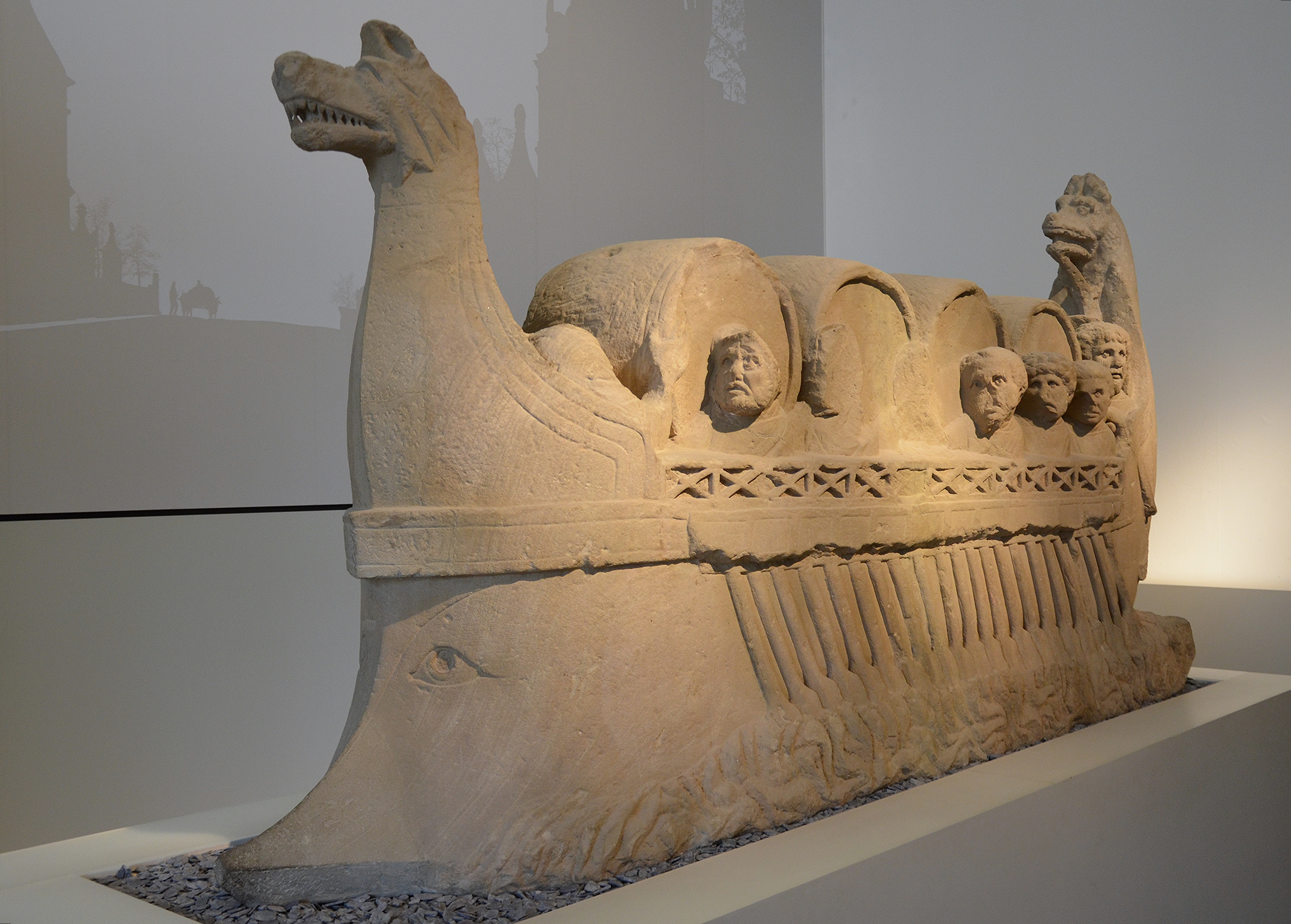
Neumagen Wine Ship

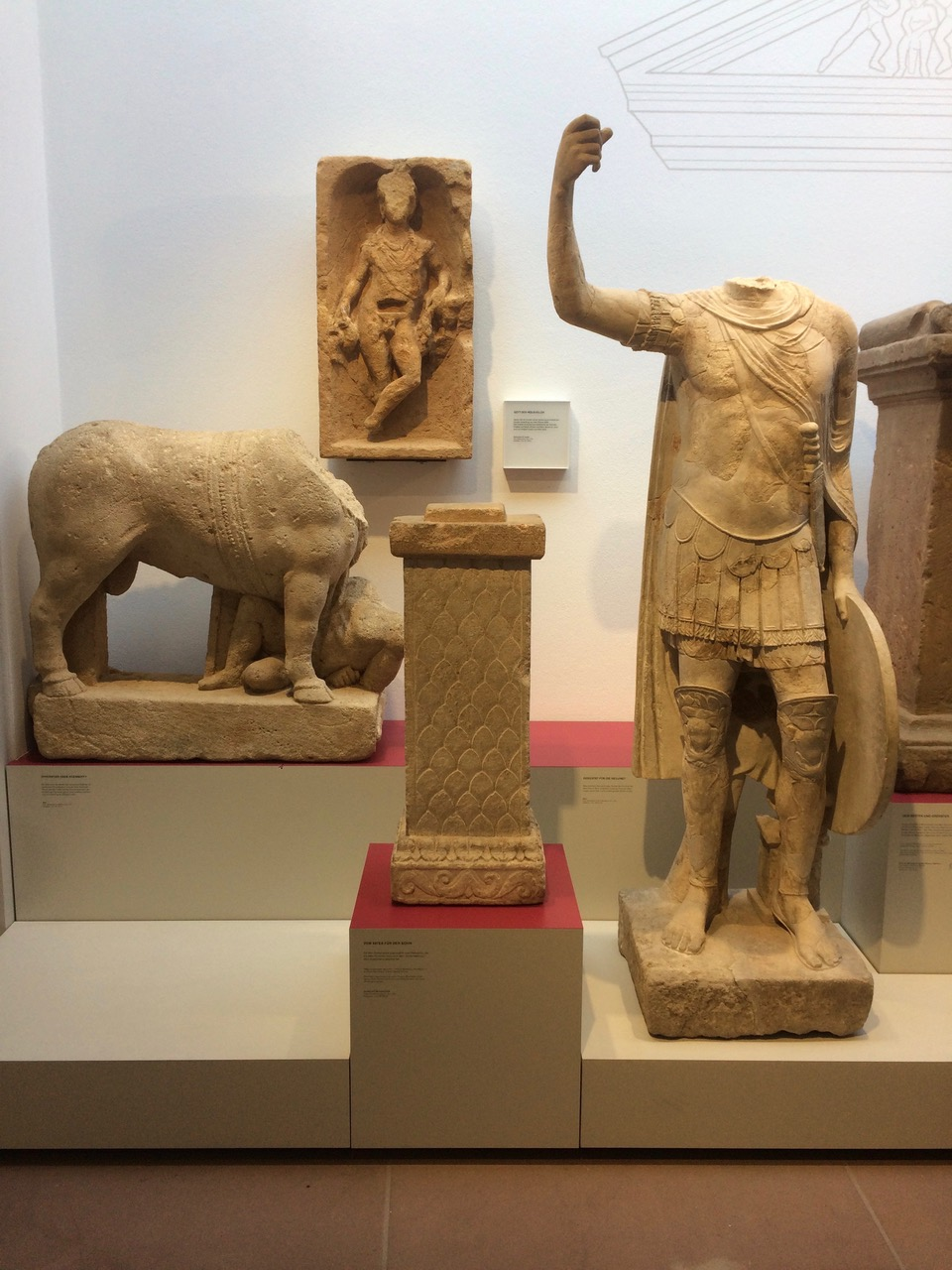
Altbachthal Mars

=== Roman frescos and mosaics ===
The museum owns several reconstructed frescos, either from town houses or public buildings in Augusta Treverorum, or from villae rusticae in the vicinity. The mosaics collection is considered the most extensive north of the Alps. One of the largest is the Monnus Mosaic from the 3rd century, with symbols of the months of the year. The Polydus mosaic from a Trier town house contains a depiction of a quadriga with, above it, the name Polydus.

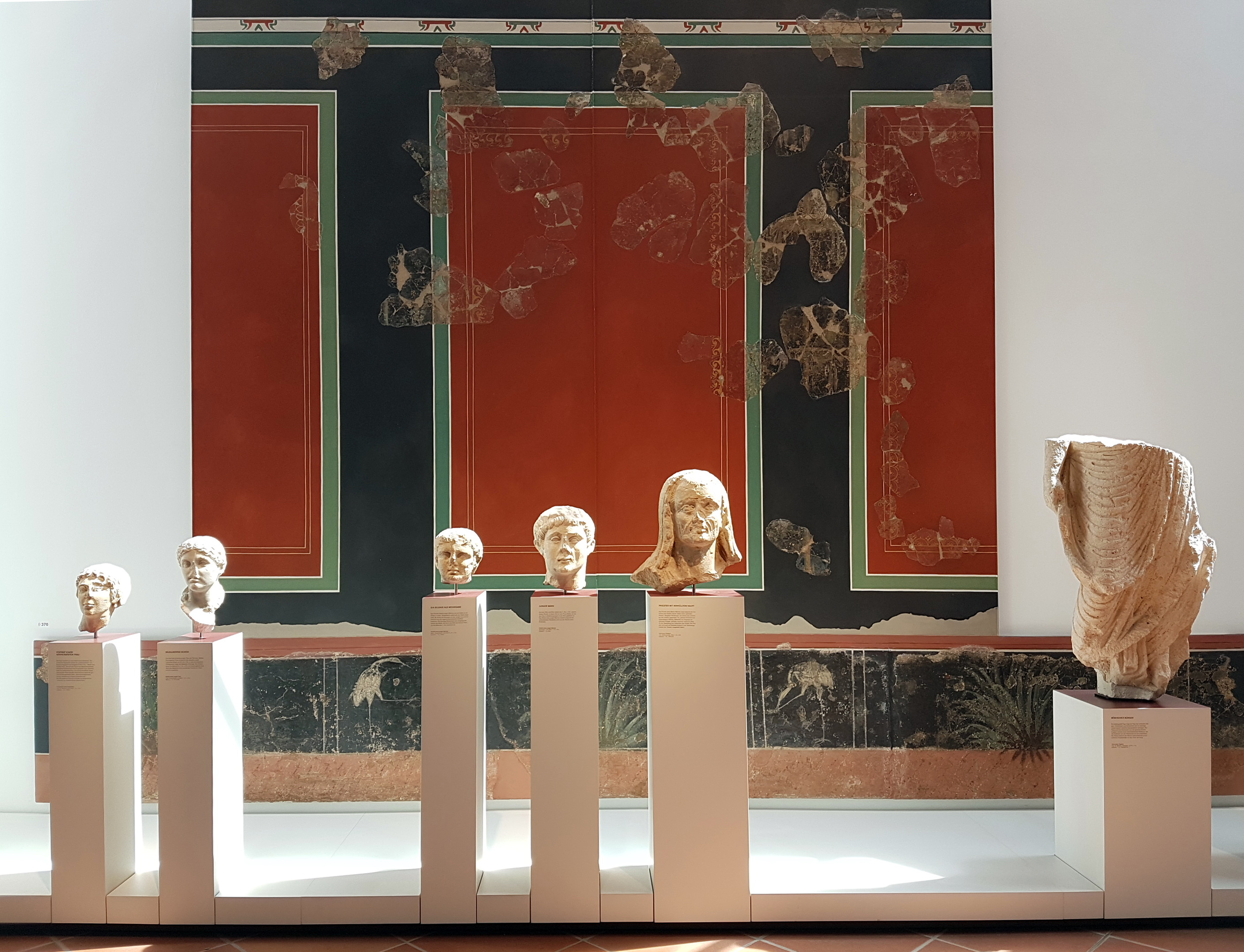
Trier fresco (reconstructed)

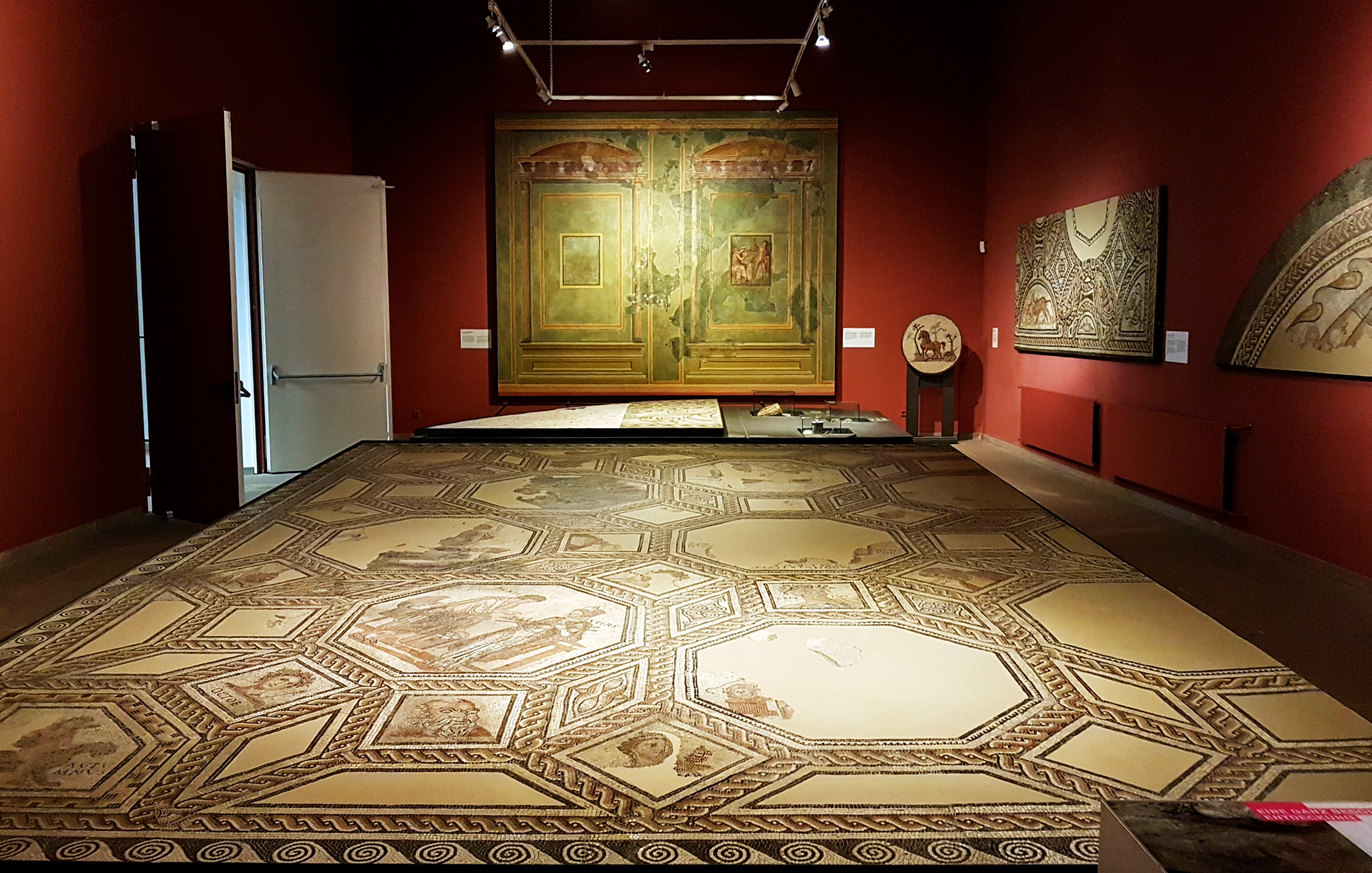
Monnus Mosaic and fresco

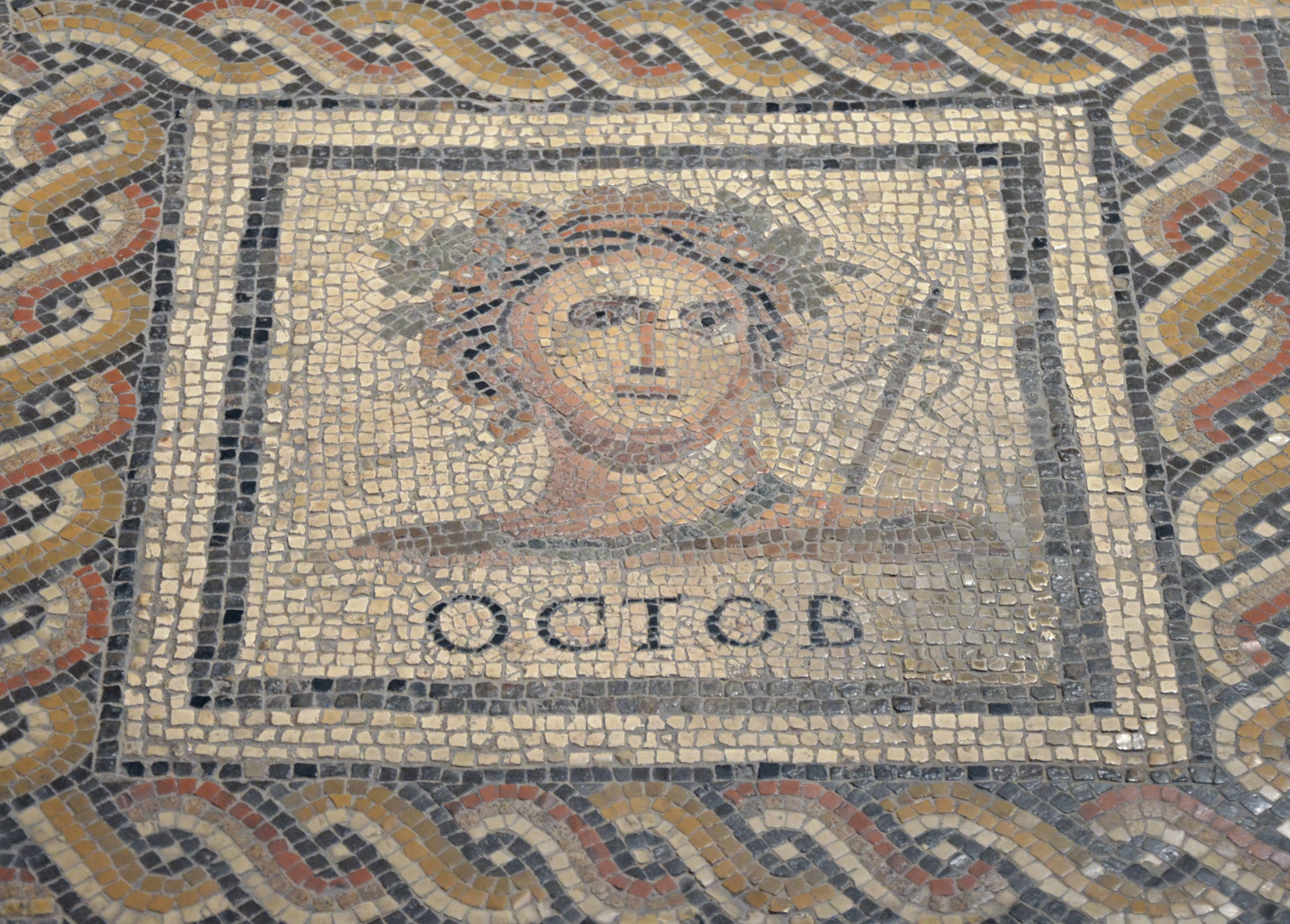
Monnus Mosaic (detail)

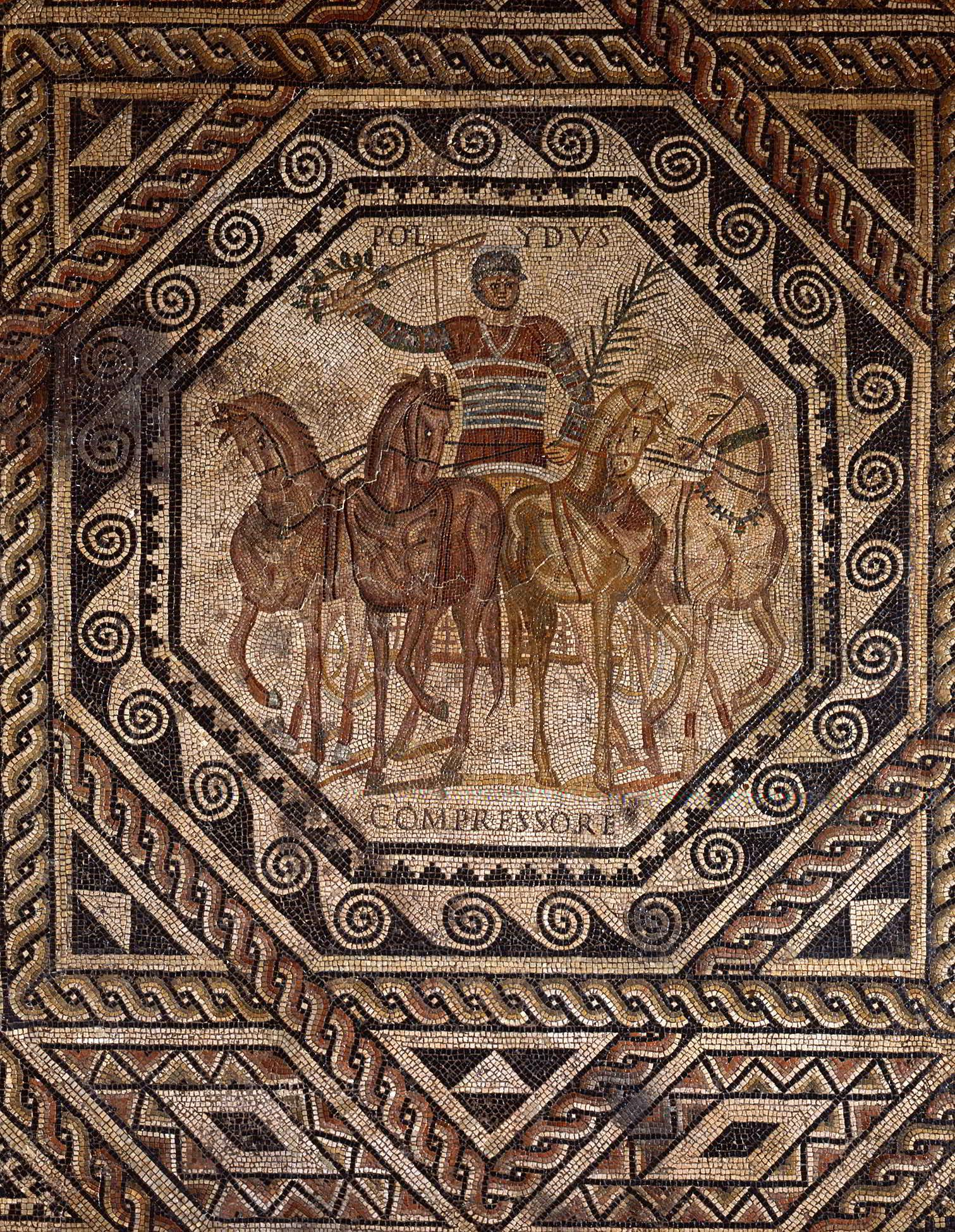
Polydus Mosaic

=== Roman Trier (scale models, utensils, etc.) ===
The staggering number of Roman finds from Augusta Treverorum is an indication of the town's importance during this era. For a while Trier was the northern capital of the Empire. A large scale model rightfully takes up a central place in the exhibition dedicated to Roman Trier. There are also scale models of individual buildings, some of which still exist. The museum has a fine collection of Roman glass. A cage cup from Piesport, found in a grave in Trier, underlines the craftsmanship. The importance of Roman Trier became once more apparent in 1993 when a hoard of thousands of coins was found in the city centre, the largest Roman gold hoard ever found (with 2650 aurei weighing ca. 18,5 kg). The treasure is kept in a separate coin cabinet, containing one of Germany's largest numismatic collections.

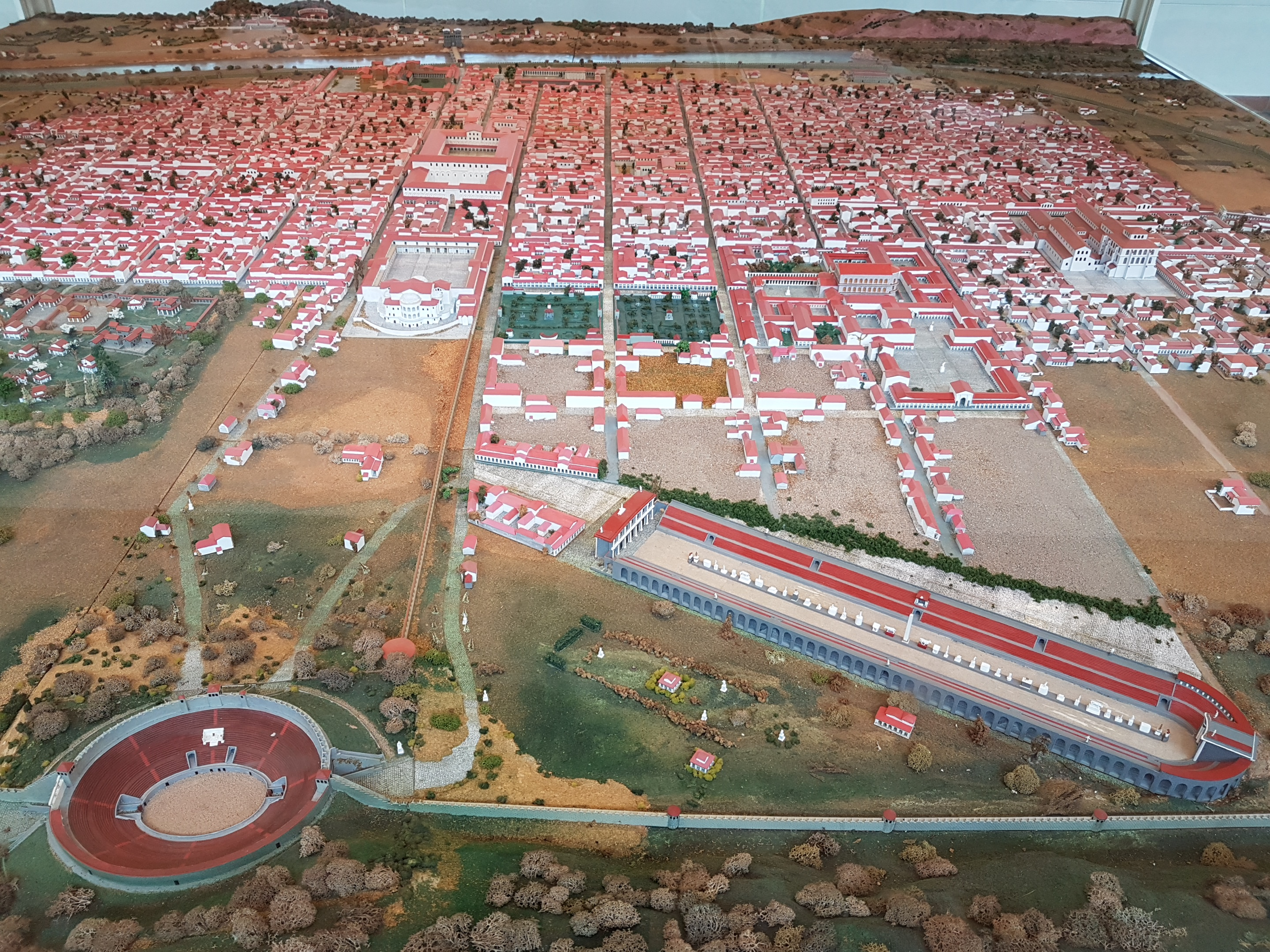
Scale model of Trier

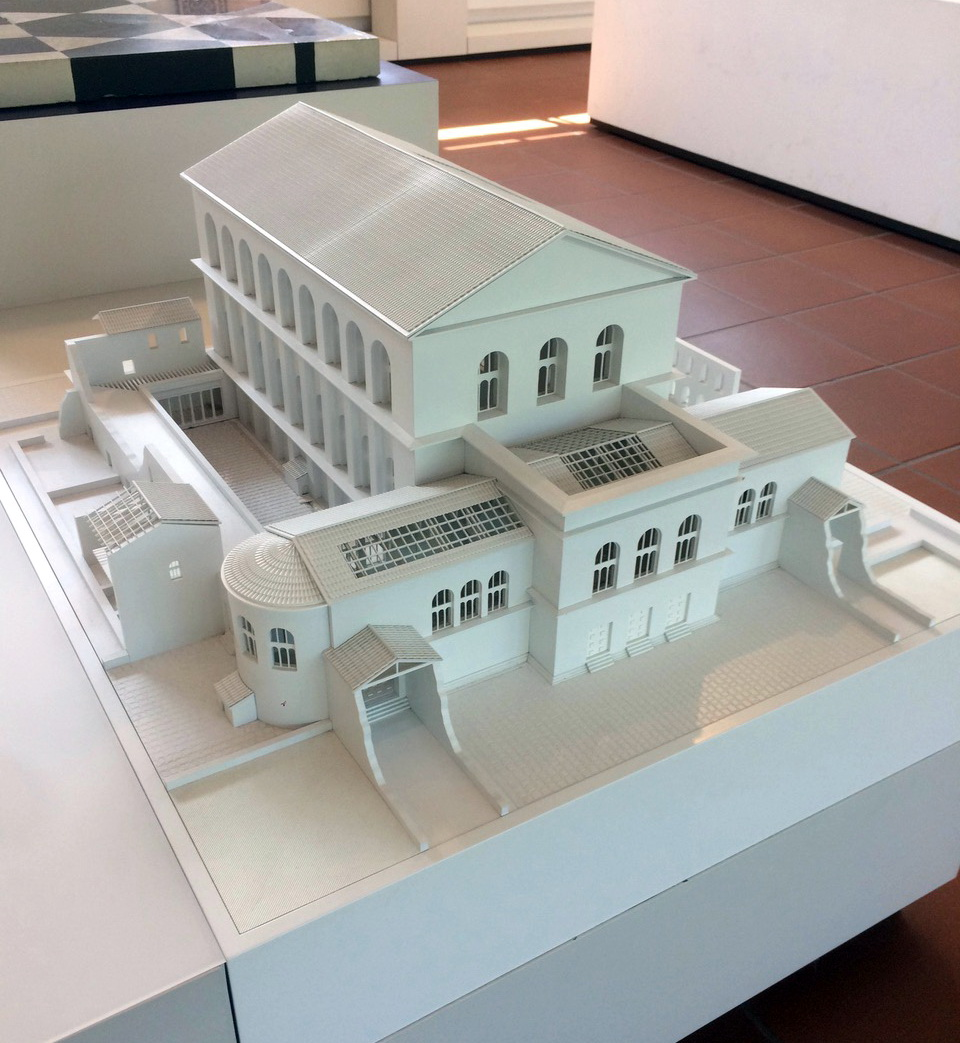
Basilica of Constantine

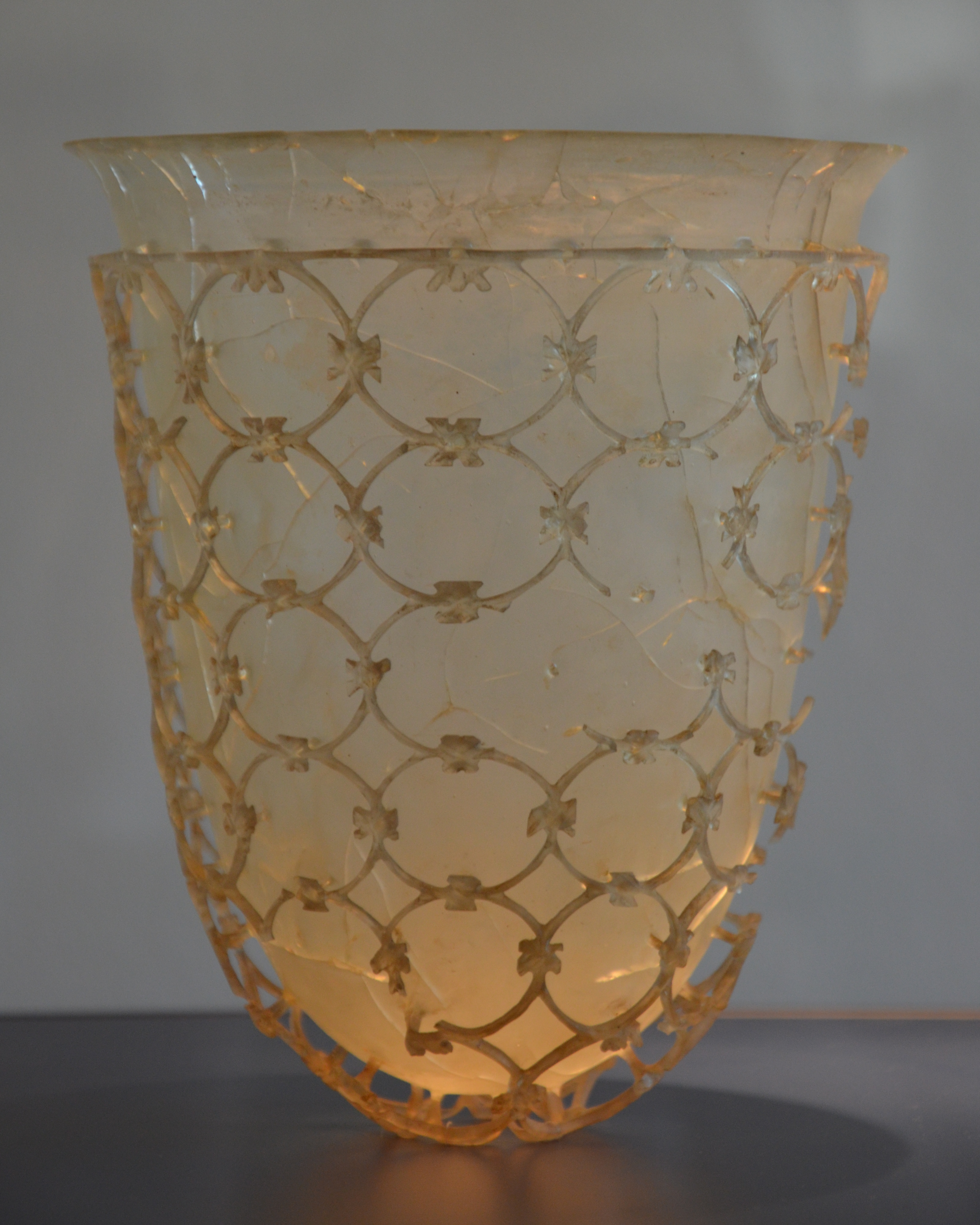
Roman cage cup

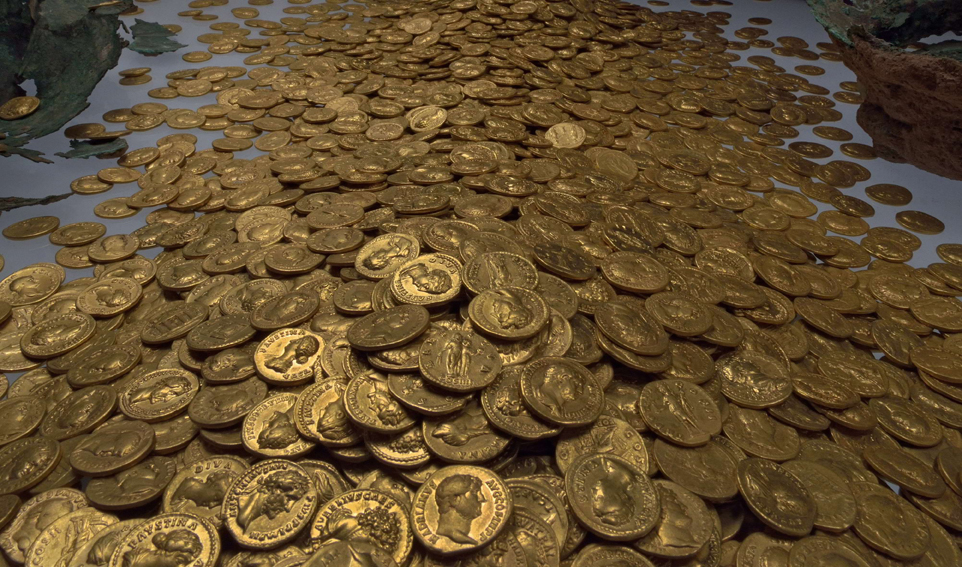
Trier gold hoard

=== Early Middle Ages ===
After the Romans departed, Trier remained an important (Christian) centre in the Frankish Empire, largely due to the continuous presence of the bishops. Proof to this are two gilded disc fibulae and other grave goods from the Merovingian and Carolingian era. Some architectural fragments date from the same period. Small but noteworthy is the collection Early Christian gravestones from the 5th, 6th and 7th century.

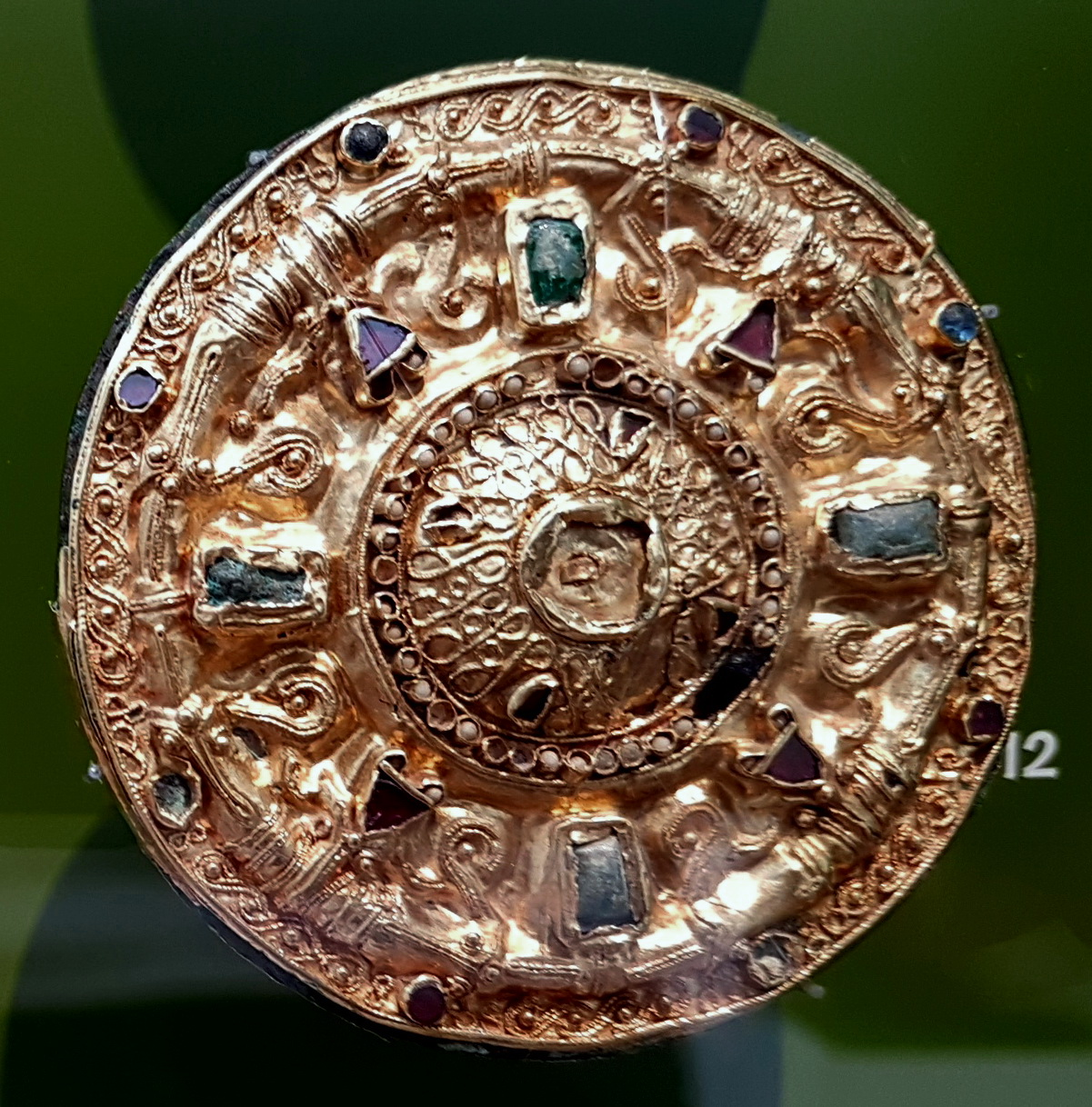
Frankish fibula

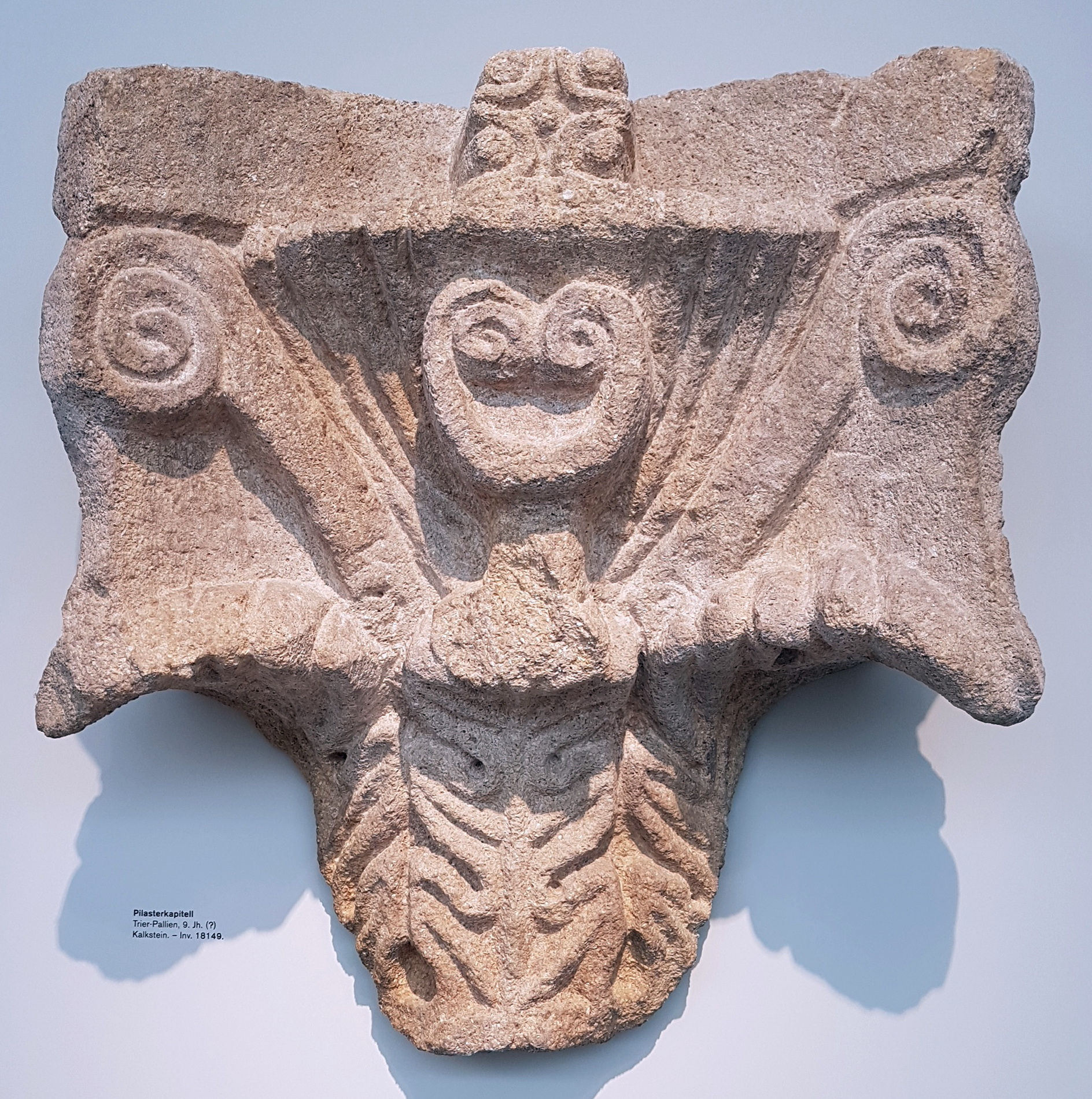
Carolingian capital

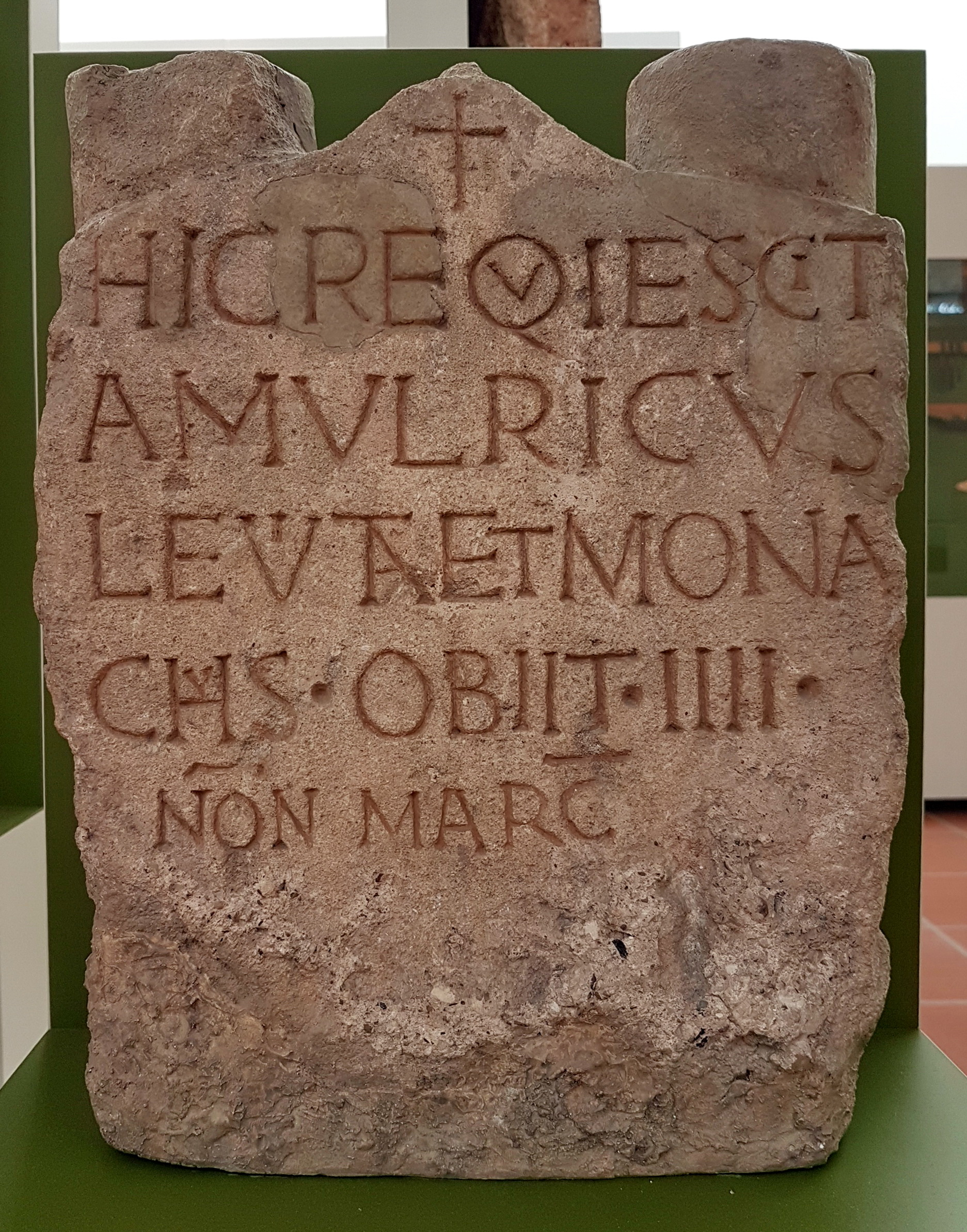
Early Christian gravestone

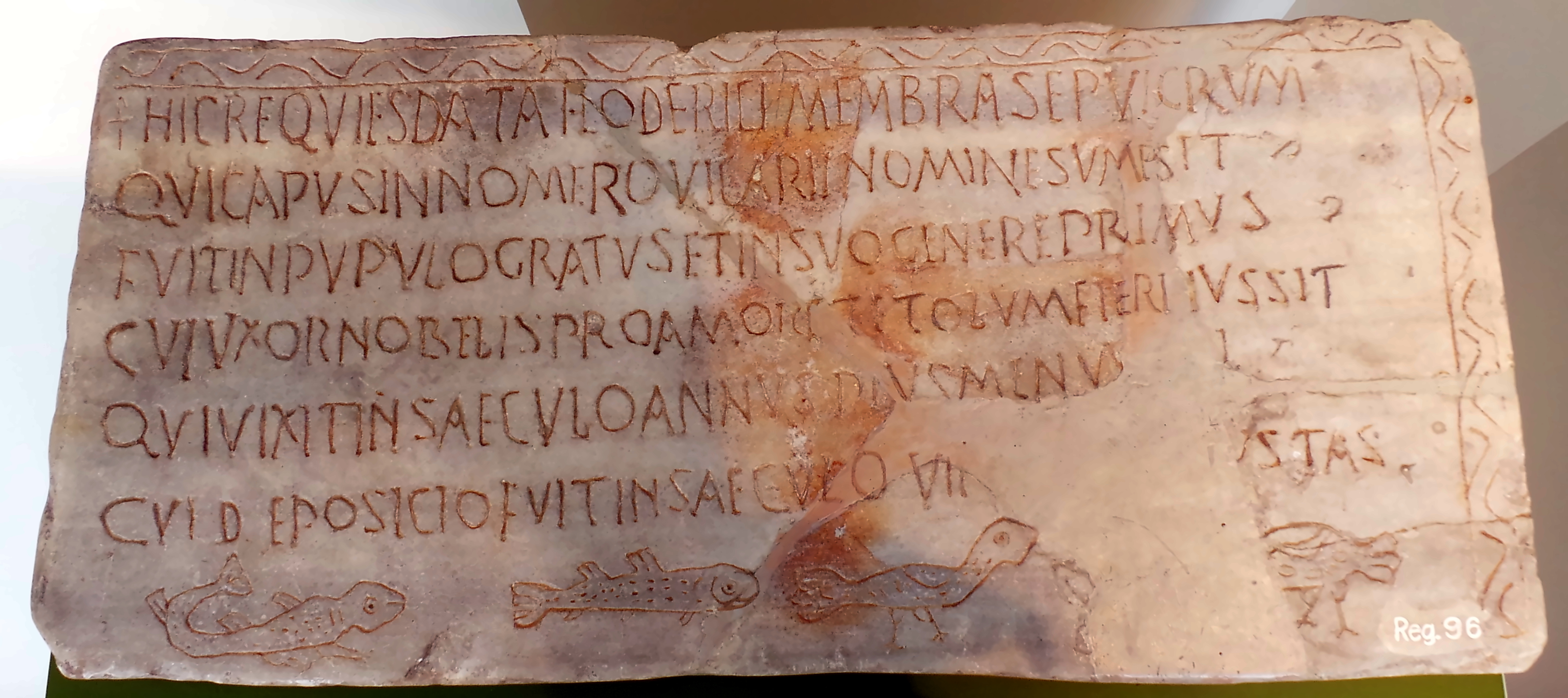
Grafstone of Hlodericus

=== High and Late Middle Ages ===
At the end of the 10th century Trier was a centre of the Ottonian Renaissance. The main products of the so-called Egbert workshops are now in the Treasury of Trier Cathedral and in museums elsewhere in Germany. The Rheinisches Landesmuseum has some stone sculptures from this period but they do not attain to the same level as the metalwork and manuscript illumination from the Egbert workshops. A forte in the collection however is Romanesque sculpture of the 11th and 12th century. Many capitals and reliefs originate from demolished monasteries and churches in Trier, as from the once important Abbeys of St. Matthias, St. Paulin and St. Maximin. The museum possesses several statues of Jesus, the Virgin Mary and various saints from the Late Gothic period, as well as some stained-glass windows from Trier Cathedral.

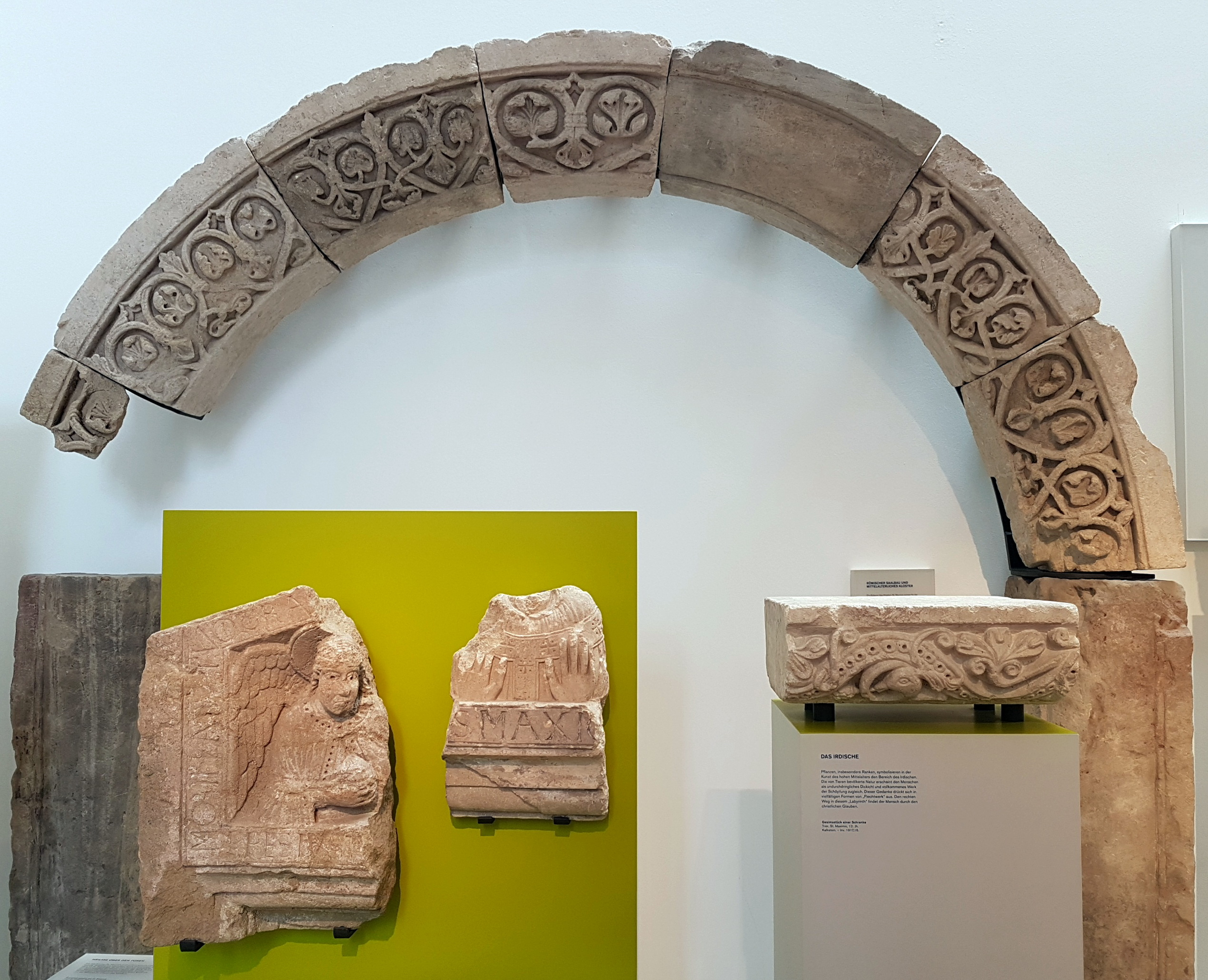
Fragments from St. Maximin's

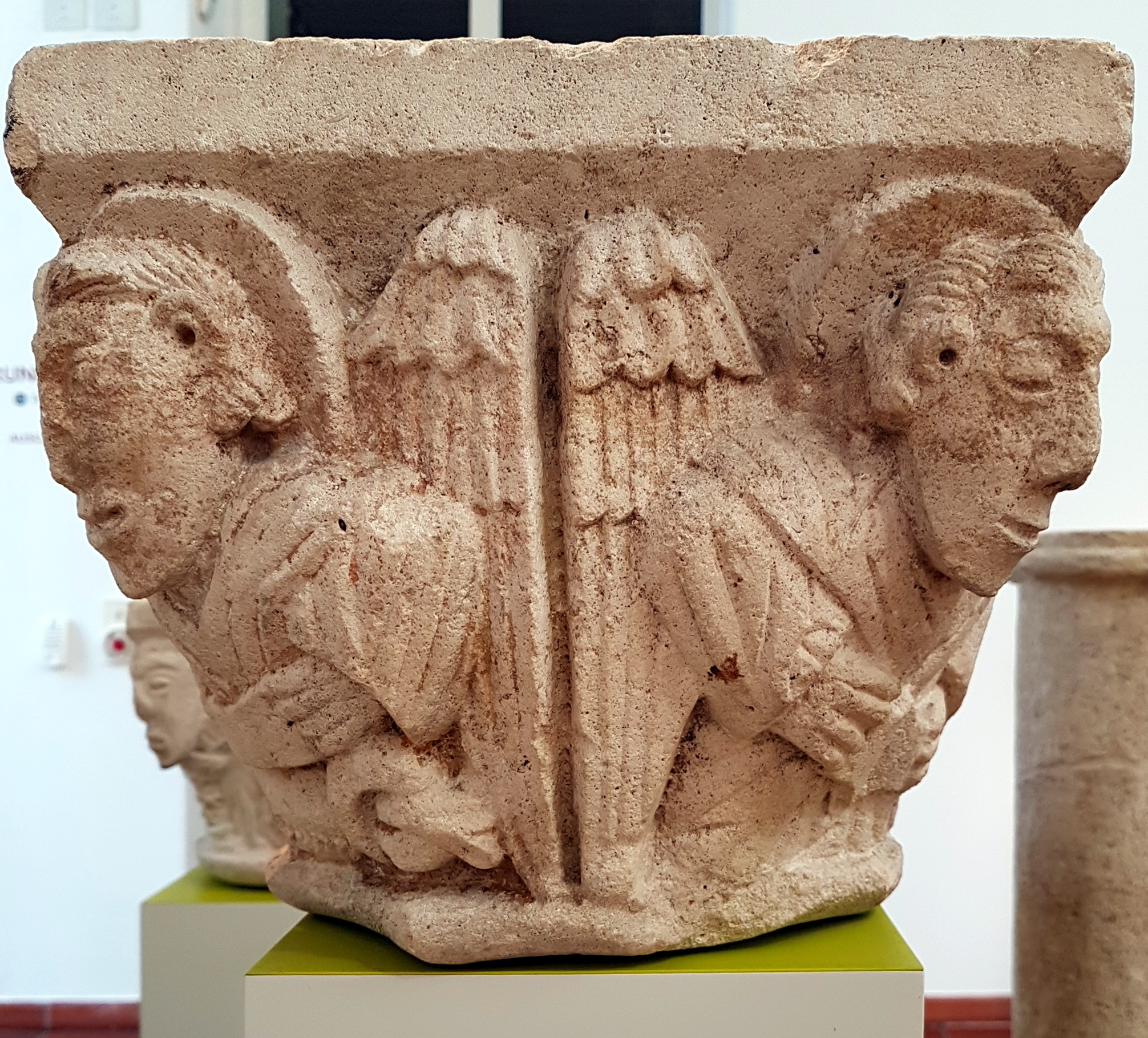
Romanesque capital

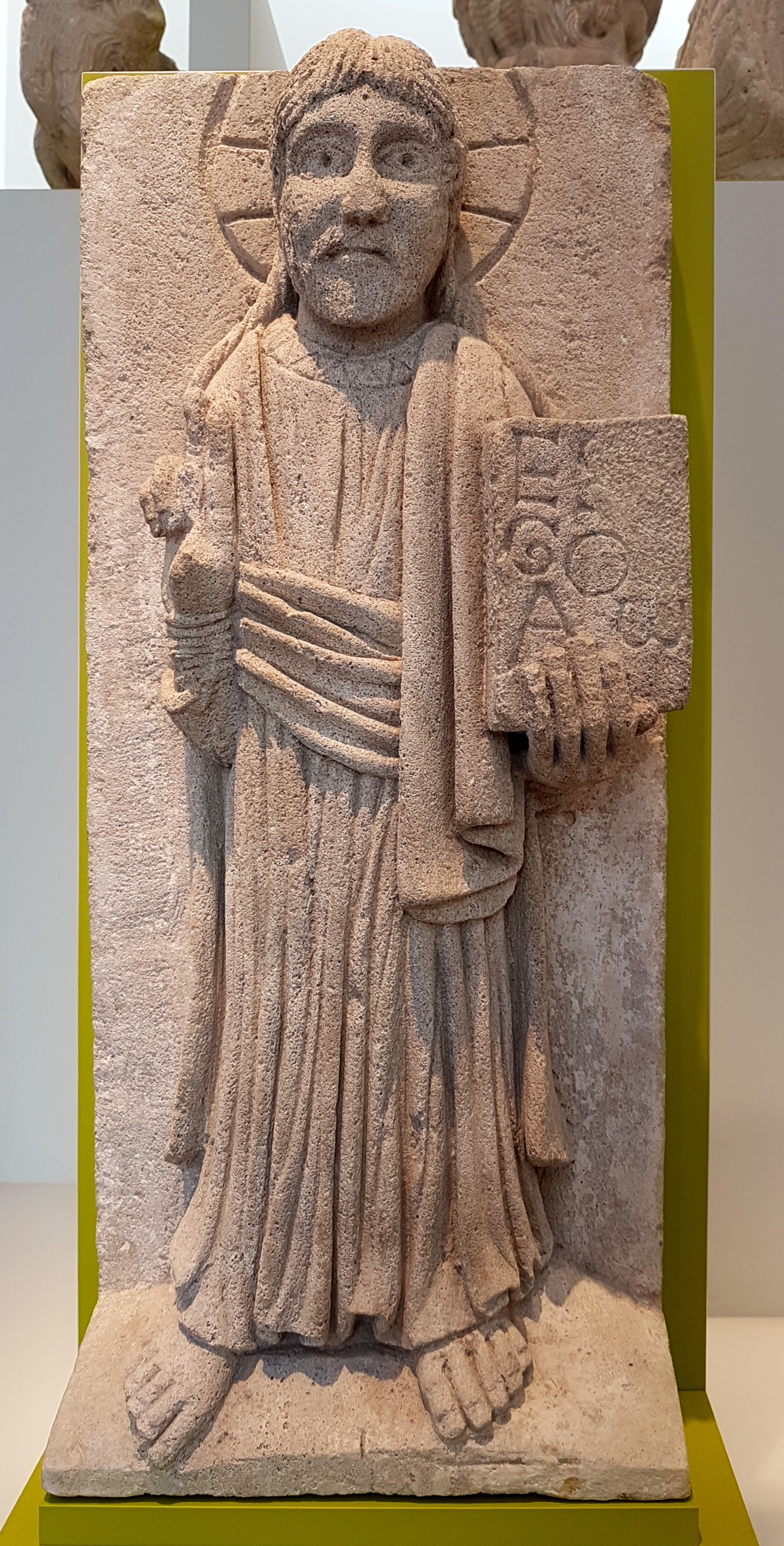
Christ as Α and Ω

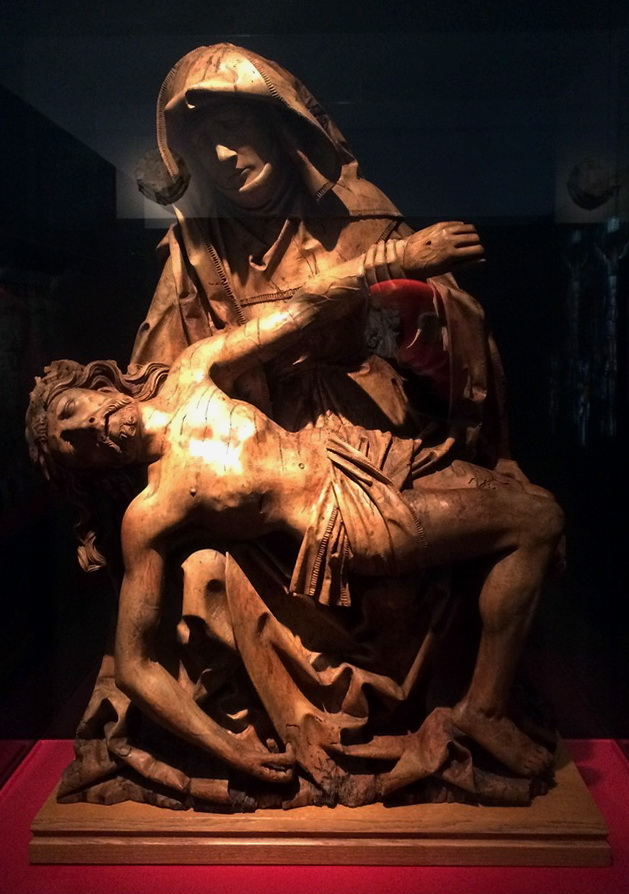
Late Gothic Pietà

=== Modern era ===
A scale model of Porta Nigra/St. Simeon's as it appeared around 1800, clarifies how some Roman monuments in Trier survived as churches. A magnificent triumphal arch is a reconstruction of the funeral monument that Christoph von Rheineck had erected in the Liebfrauenkirche in 1535. It is the earliest Renaissance monument in Germany. The original sculptures are kept in the Museum am Dom. A much more humble 17th or 18th-century relief of the three first bishops of Trier from the former abbey of St. Matthias is accompanied by a pious poem in Latin and German. Other objects from this period testify of the wealth at the Trier episcopal and electoral court.

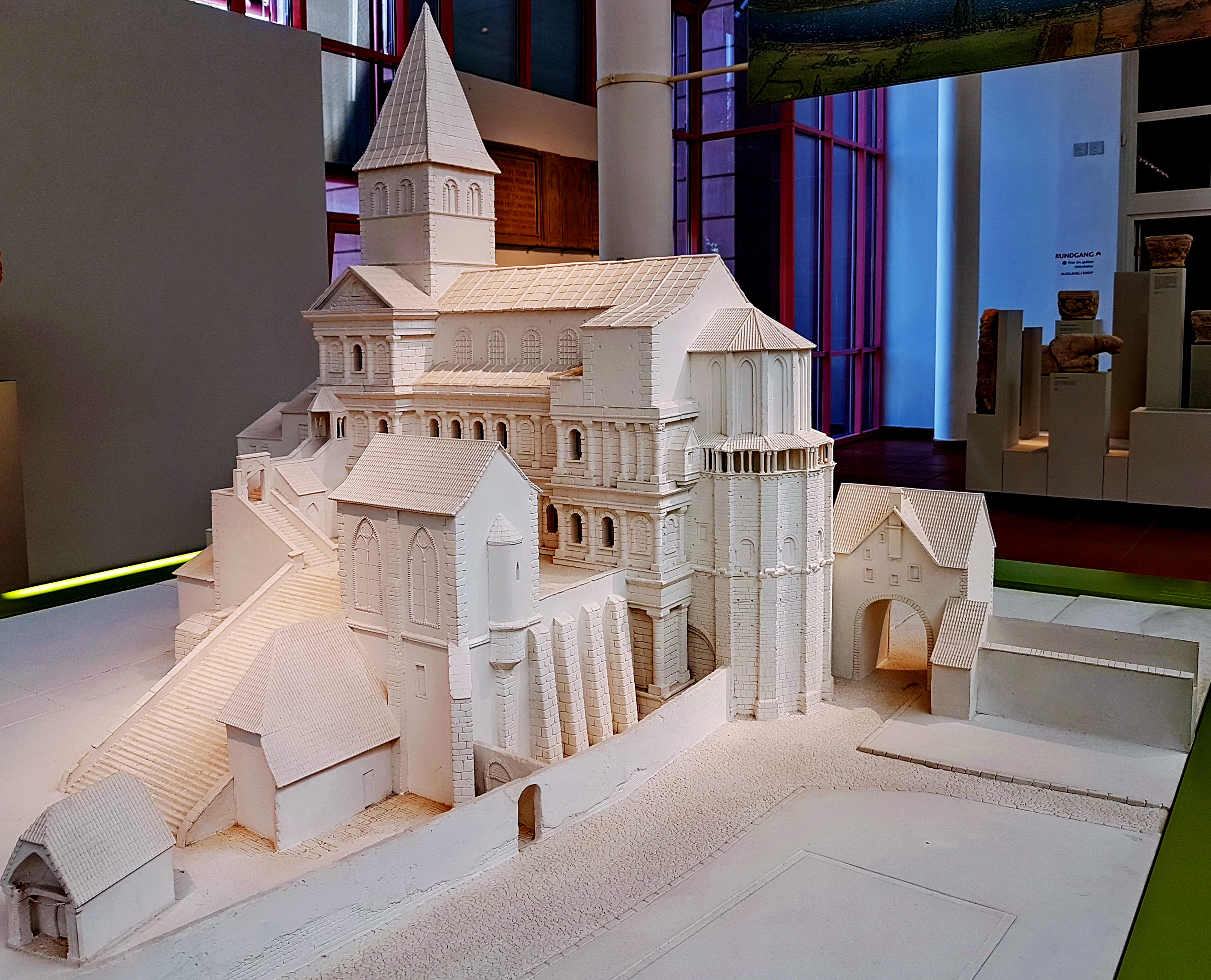
Scale model St. Simeon's

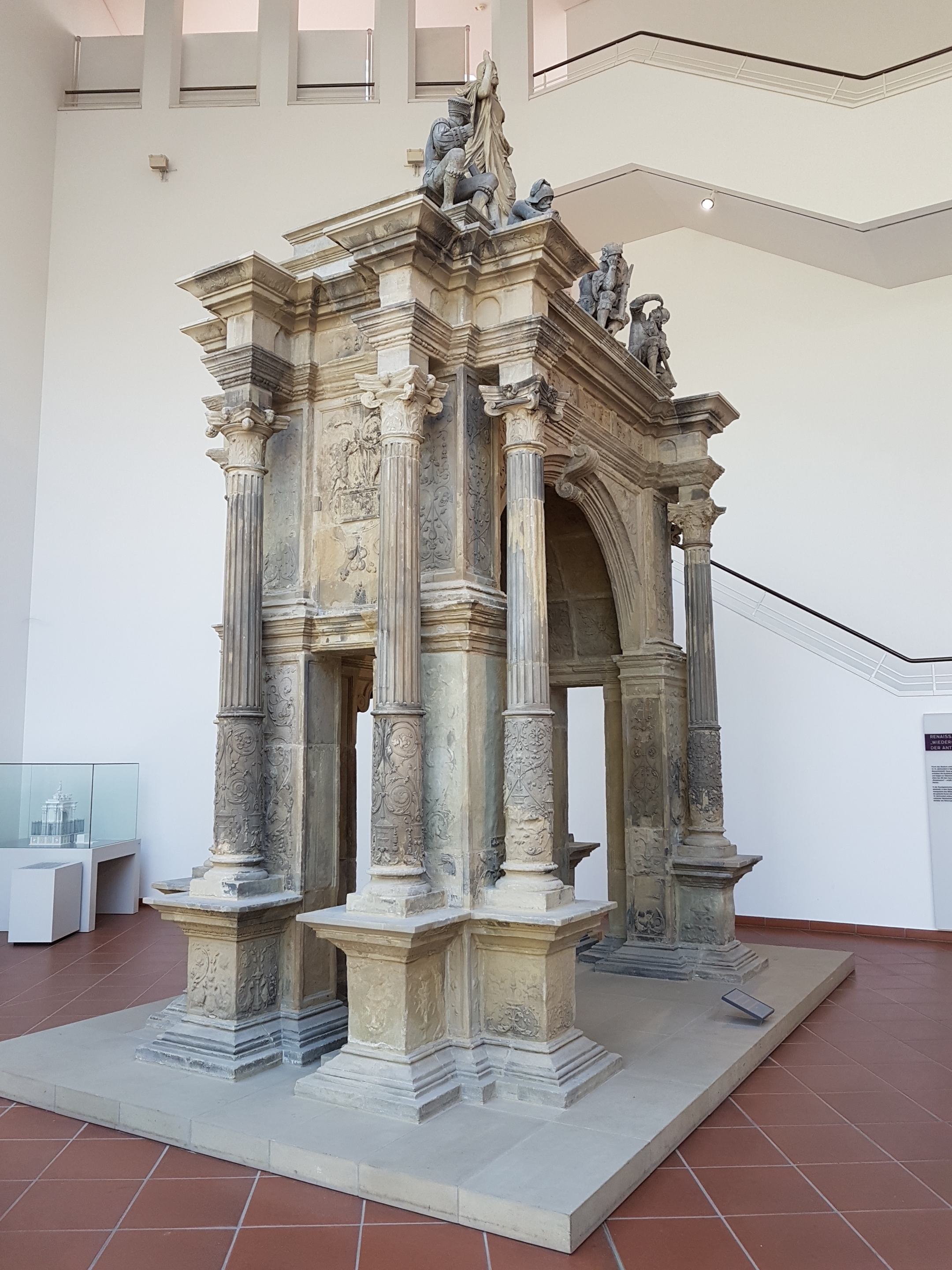
Renaissance triumphal arch

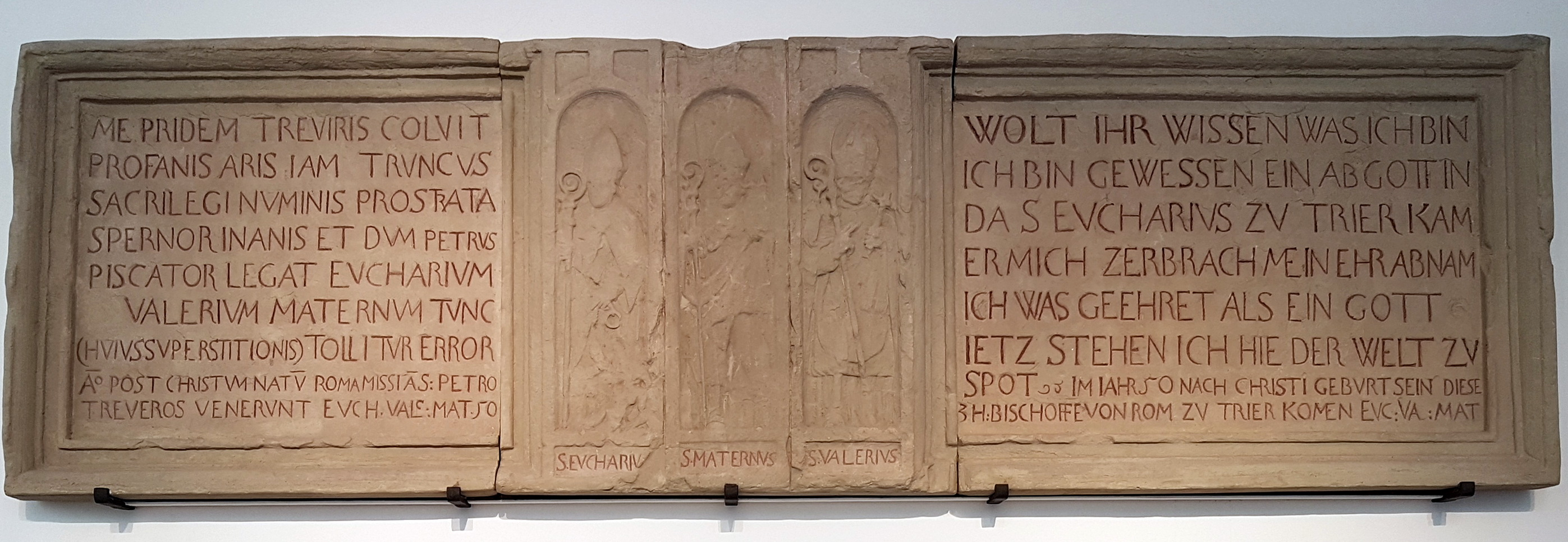
Relief Trier bishops

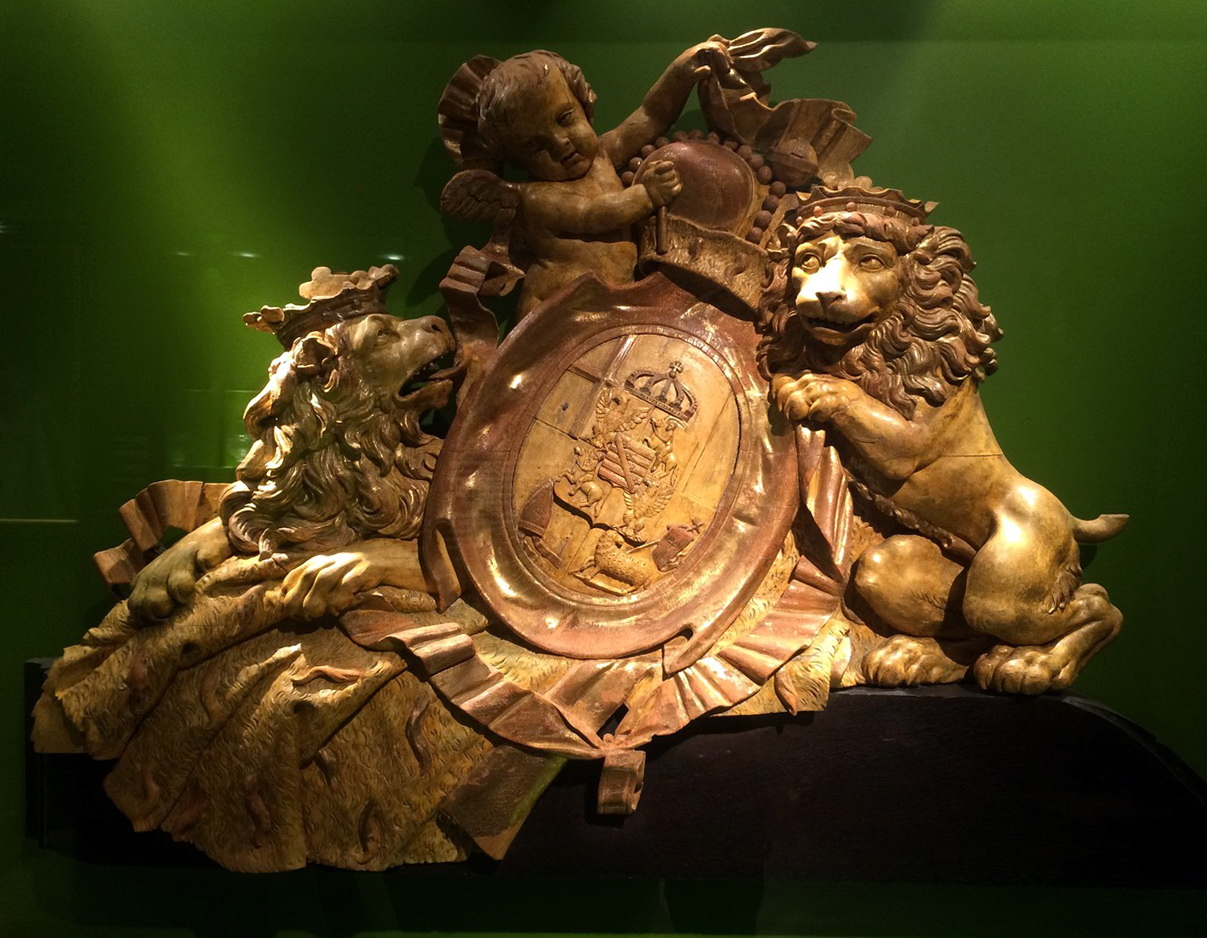
Electoral coat of arms

== See also ==
- History of Trier
- Electoral Palace, Trier
- Rheinisches Landesmuseum Bonn
- Romano-Germanic Central Museum (Mainz)
