= Forum Baths, Trier =

Roman baths in Trier, Germany

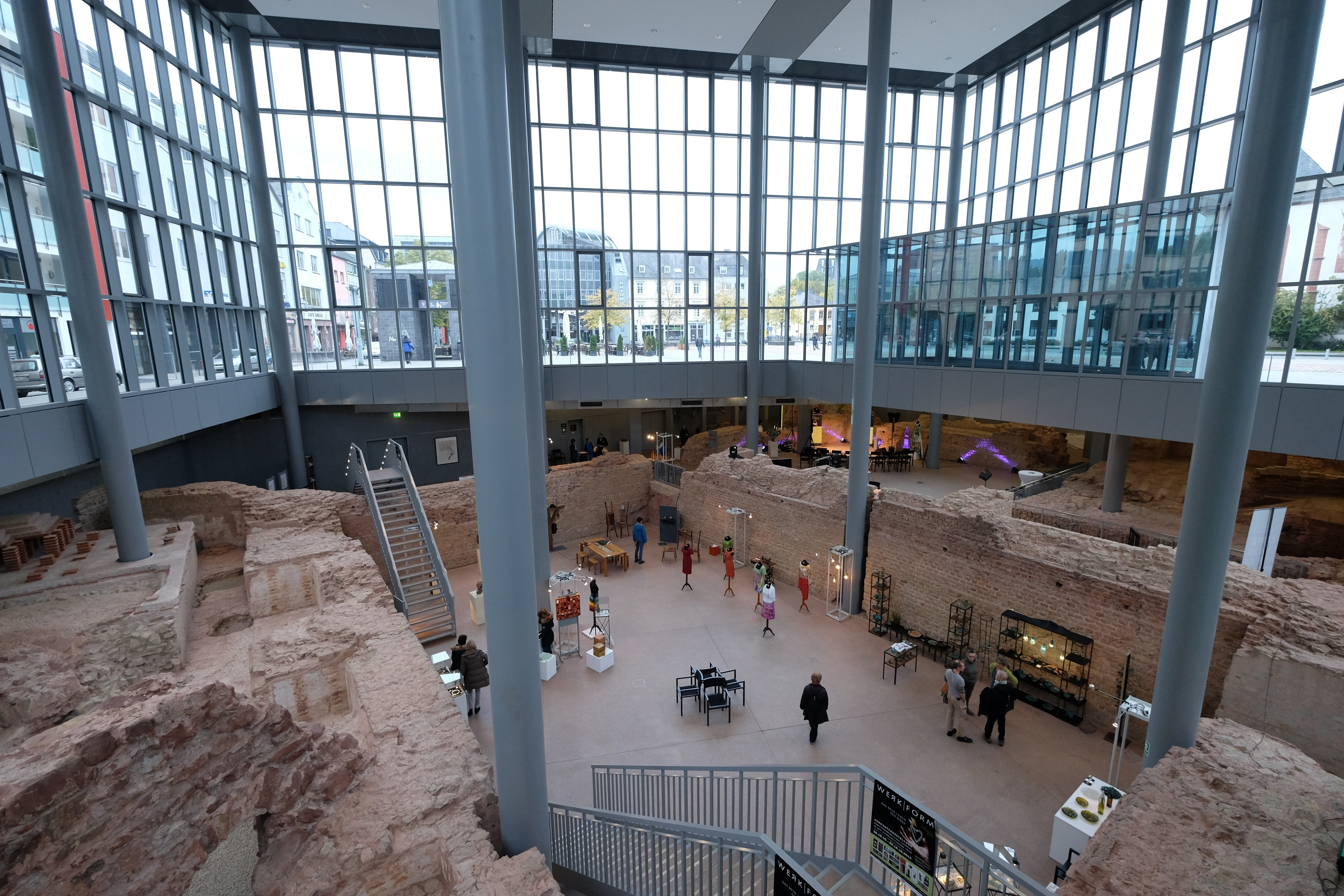
Interior of modern Museum

49.752736°N 6.63766°E

The Forum Baths of Trier (German: Thermen am Viehmarkt or Viehmarktthermen) are a ruin of a Roman bath complex in Augusta Treverorum, modern-day Trier, Germany. The baths were discovered in 1987.

== History ==
=== Roman Period ===
The Forum Baths of Trier were converted in the 4th century C.E. from some older buildings, dated to around the 2nd century C.E. The structure encompassed 8364 m^{2} . The bath house utilized the passive heating of the sun, like many Roman baths, and oriented the caldarium and tepidarium to the south, and the frigidarium to the north.

Along with the other bathhouses, the Forum Baths remained in use through the end of the fourth century. But the complex fell out of use during the early fifth century as Trier was repeatedly sacked during the Migration Period.

=== Later Use ===
In the 13th century, the remains of the bath began being used as a quarry for local buildings. In the 17th and 18th centuries, the Capuchin Order built some of the buildings for their monastery over the eastern part of the bathhouse. In 1802, the monastery was dissolved and nine years later, in 1811, the garden was transformed into a cattle market (German: Viehmarkt), from which the ruins get their name.

== Gallery ==
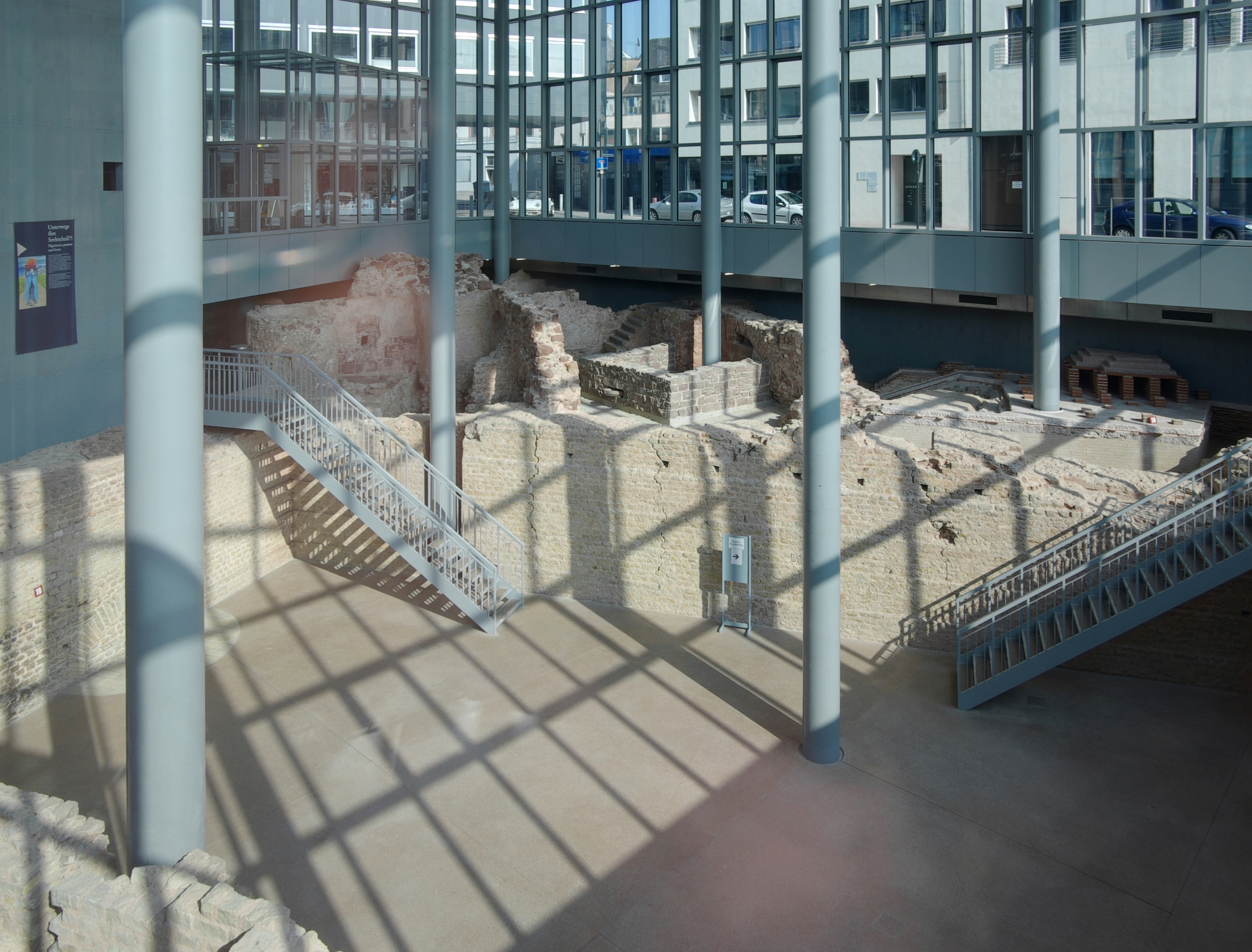
Current state of part of the remains

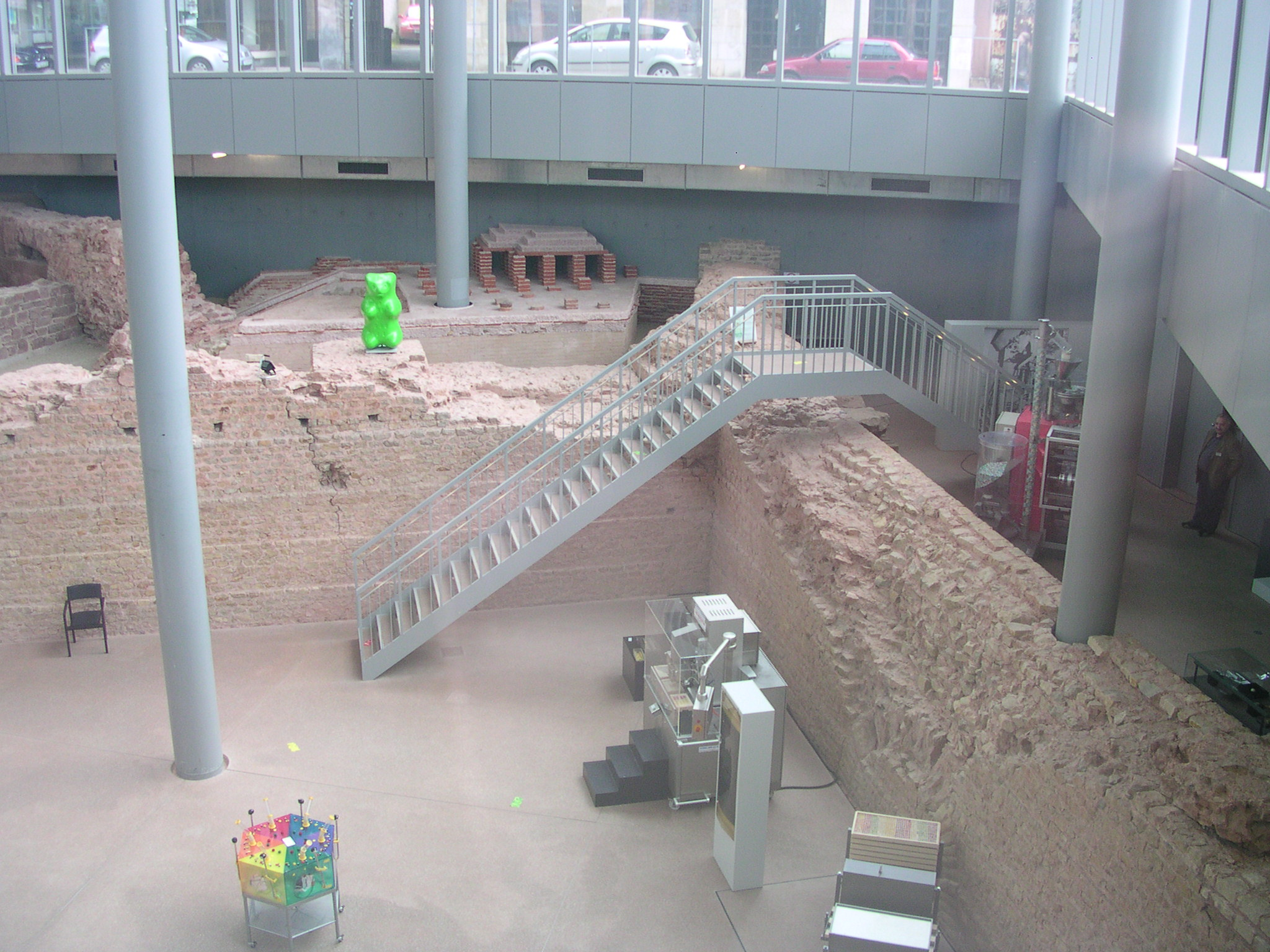
Current state of part of the remains

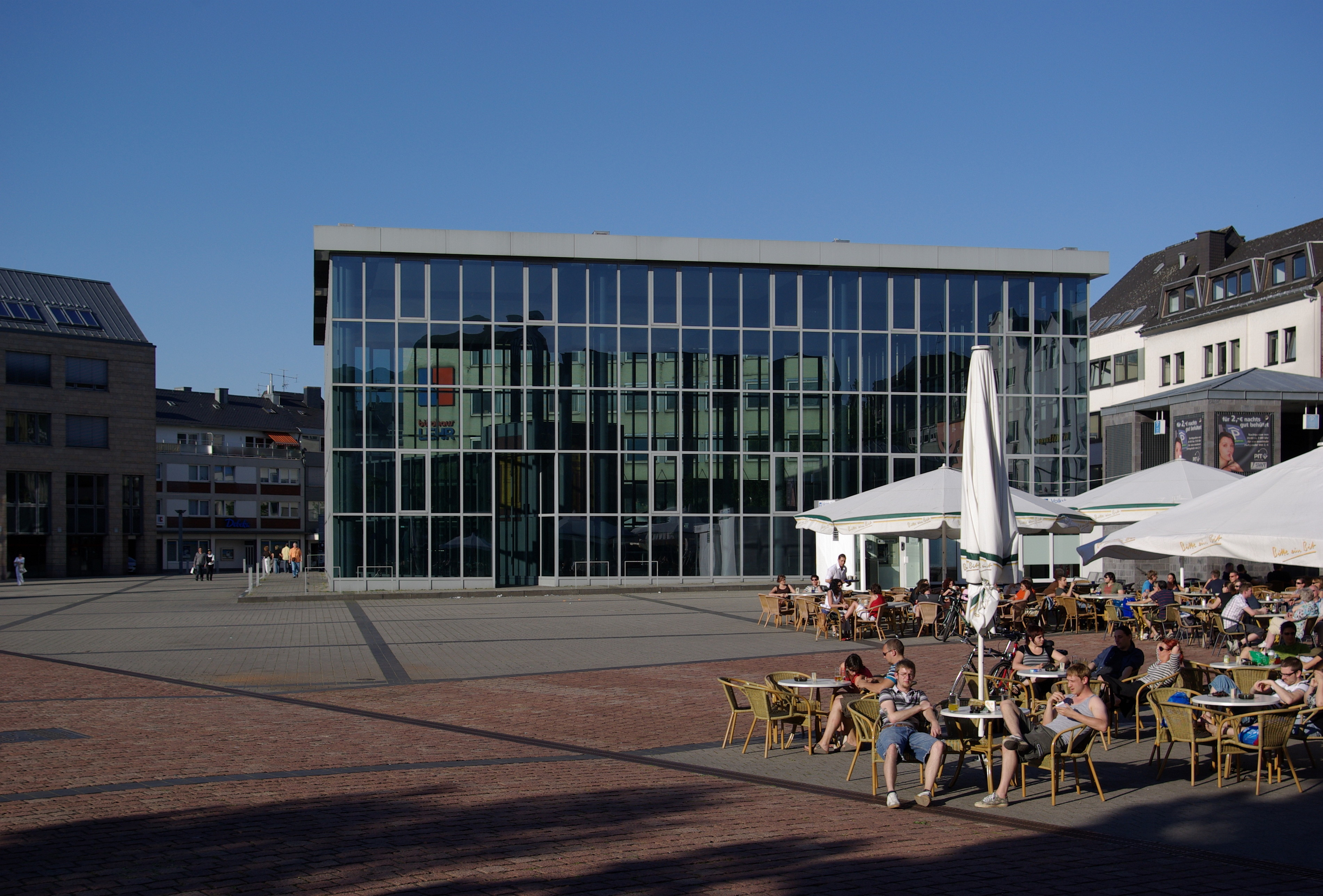
External view of the museum

== See also ==
- Ancient Roman bathing
- Thermae
- Barbara Baths
- Trier Imperial Baths
- List of Roman public baths
