= Trier Imperial Baths =

UNESCO World Heritage Site
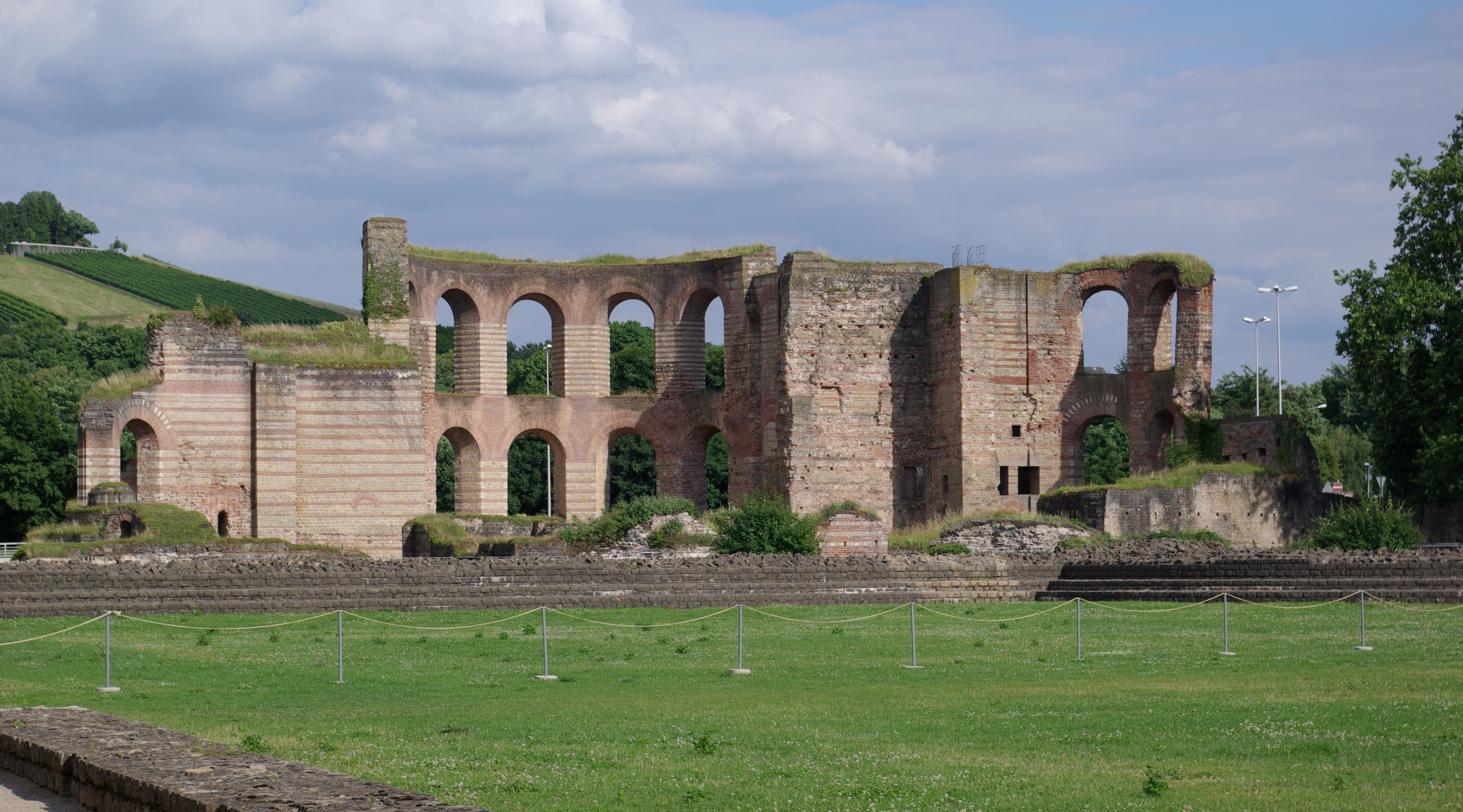

- Location within Germany Location within Rhineland-Palatinate
- Location: Trier, Rhineland-Palatinate, Germany
- Part of: Roman Monuments, Cathedral of St Peter and Church of Our Lady in Trier
- Criteria: Cultural: (i), (iii), (iv), (vi)
- Reference: 367-006
- Inscription: 1986 (10th Session)
- Coordinates: 49°44′59″N 6°38′32″E

The Trier Imperial Baths (German: Kaiserthermen) are a large Roman bath complex in Trier, Germany. The complex was constructed in the early 4th century AD, during the reign of Constantine I. During that time, Trier was a major imperial hub, being a primary residence for Constantine's son Crispus. The baths were built around hot water pools reaching 40°C. Underneath the complex was a network of underground passageways used by the staff which can still be seen today, along with the remains of the sewer system. However, the baths were never completed and were made into a castle in the Middle Ages.

== History ==
=== Roman Period ===
Constantius Chlorus initiated construction of the baths shortly before 300 C.E. and construction ceased around 316 C.E. with the baths still incomplete. Like Imperial baths found in Rome, such as the Baths of Caracalla or the Baths of Trajan, the Trier Imperial Baths were divided into two parts, the thermae and the palaestra. The palaestra measures 160 by 130 meters, while the main bath building is west of these exercise grounds.

== Gallery ==
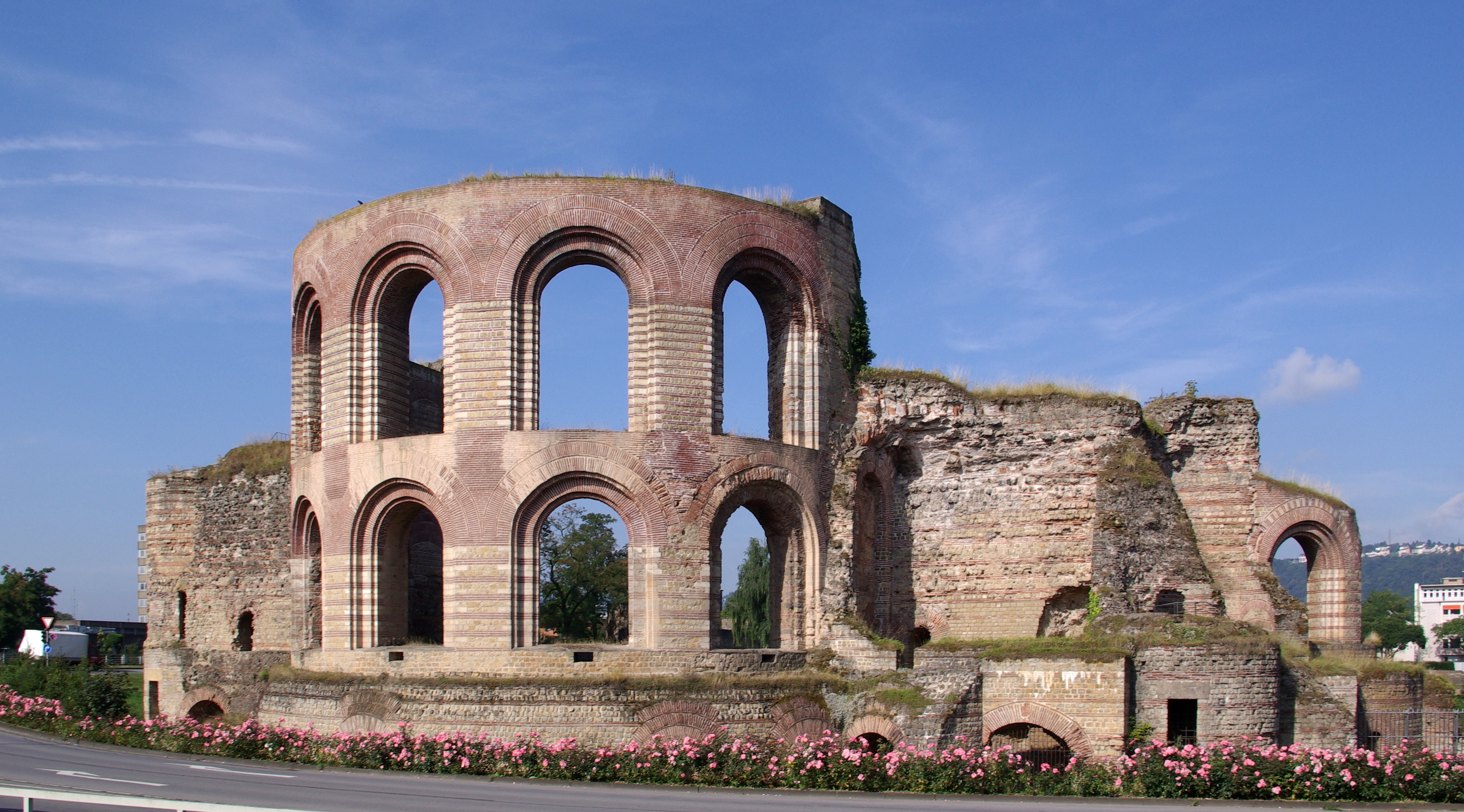

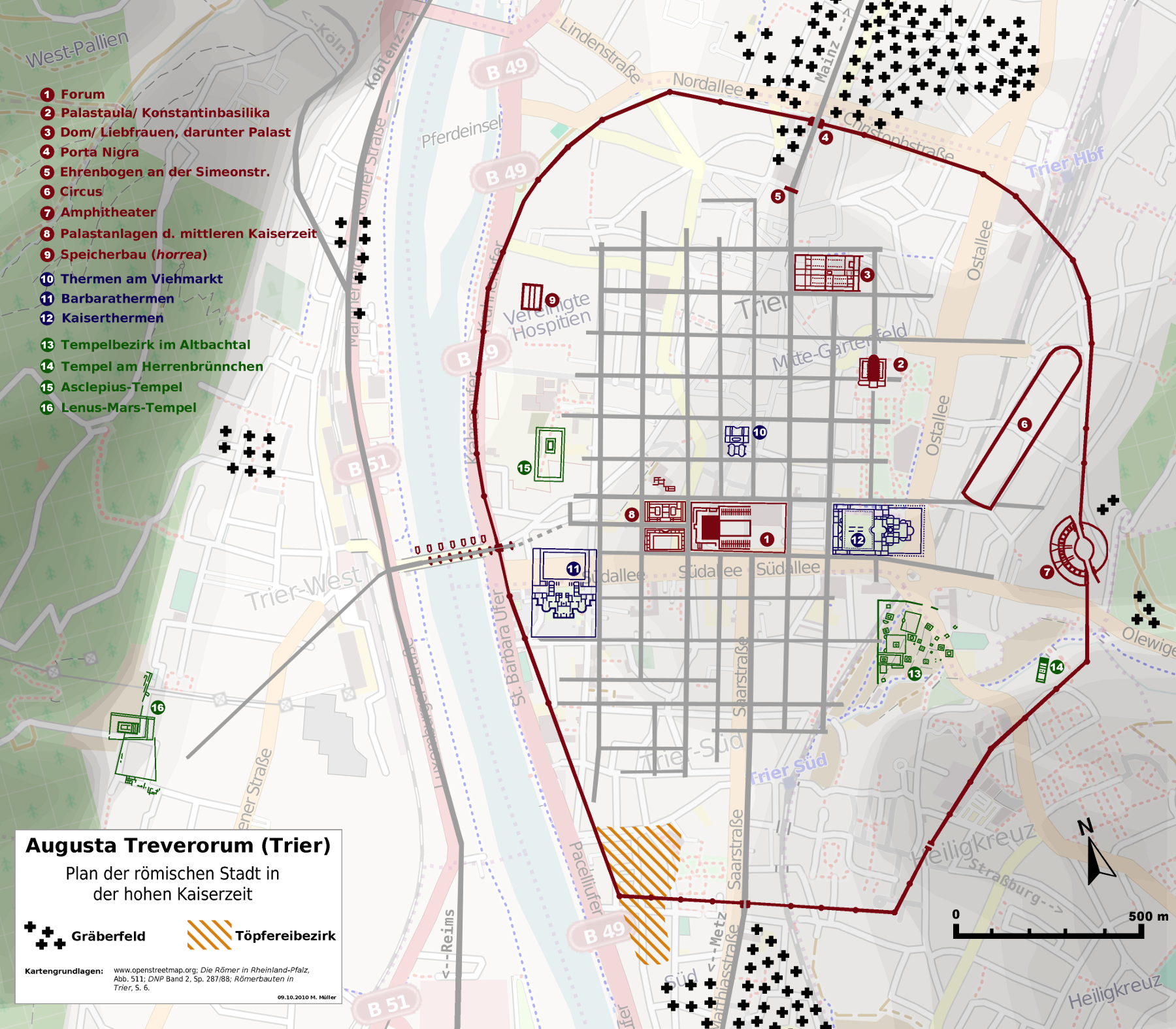
Augusta Treverorum City Plan

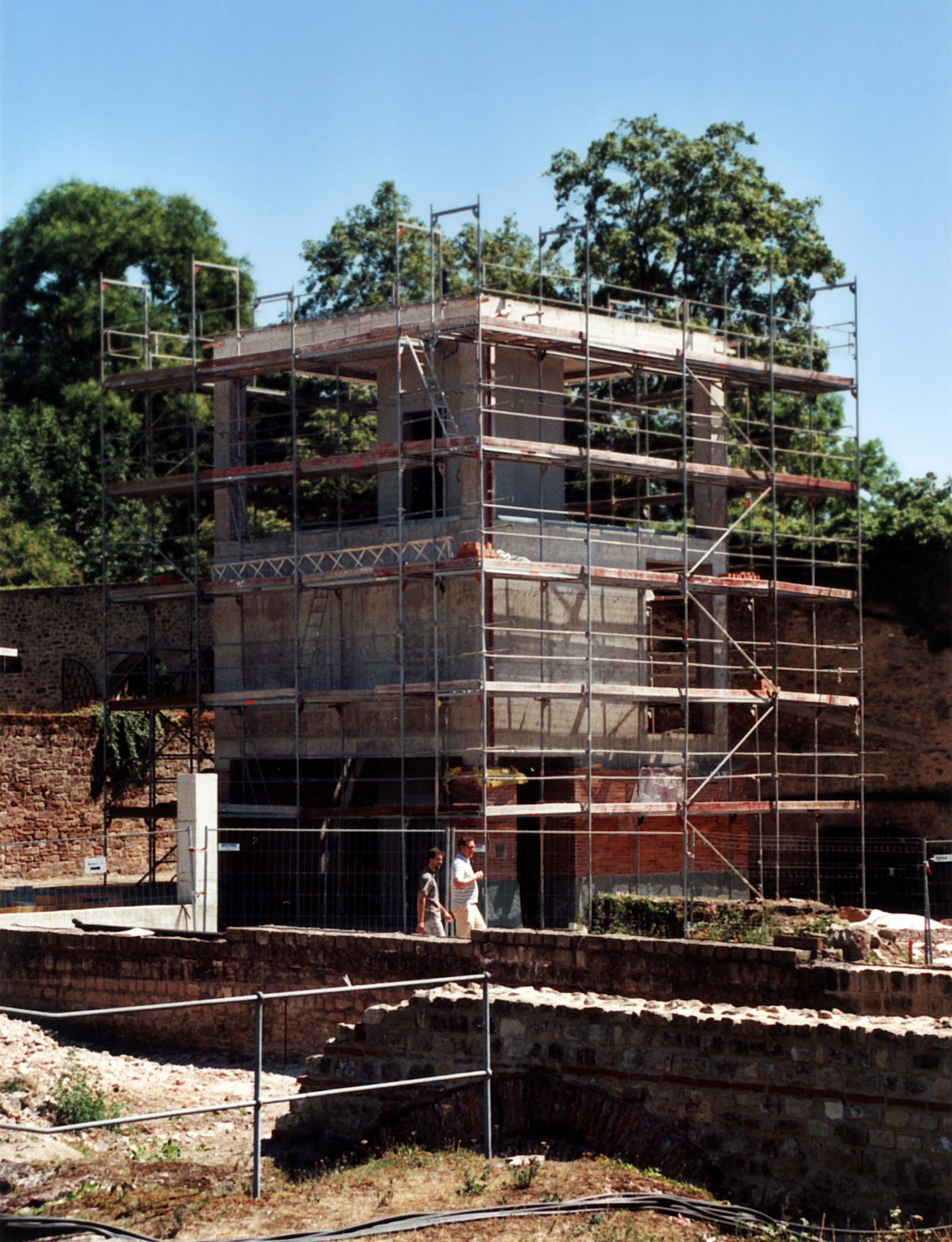

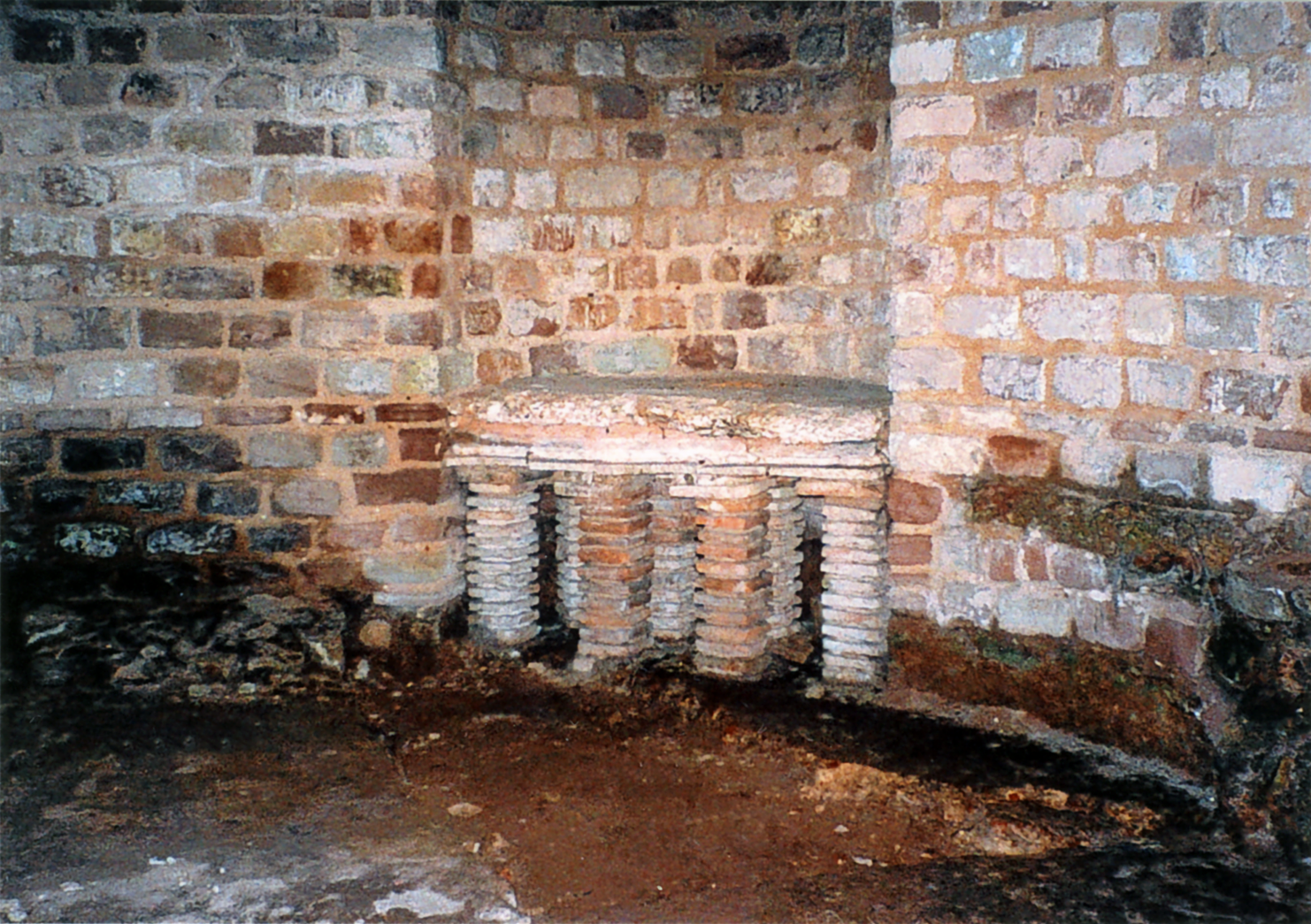

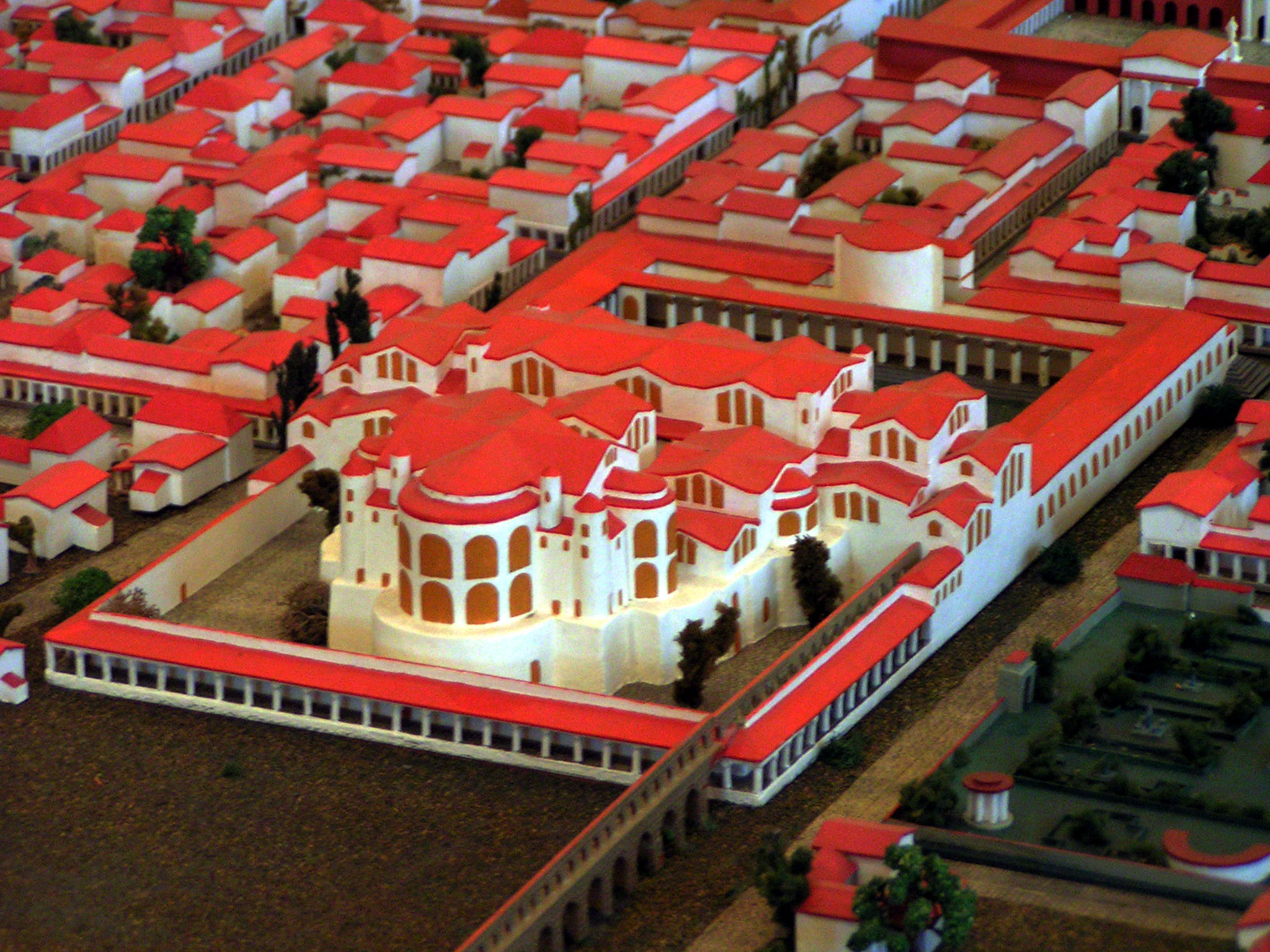
Model of the Baths

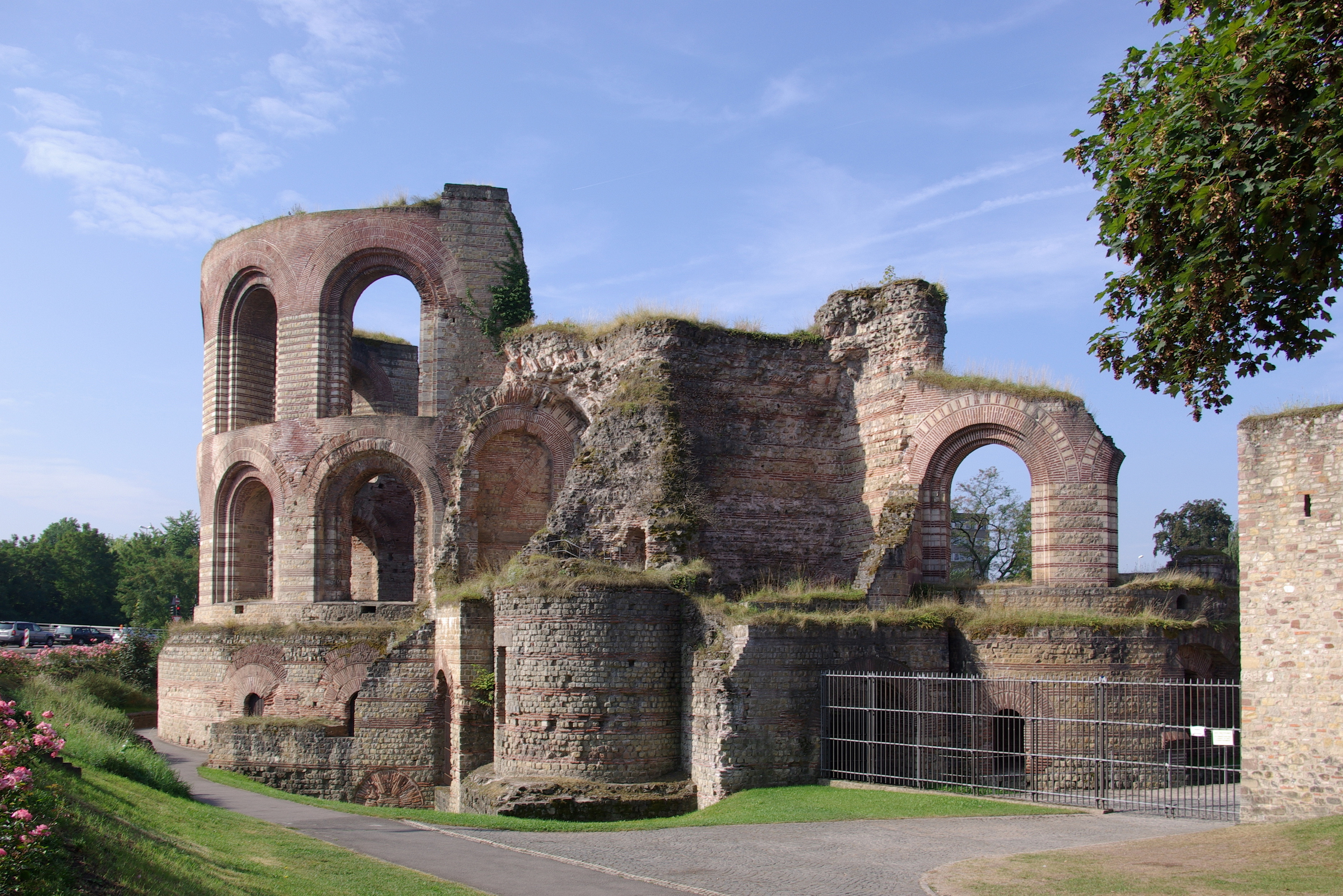

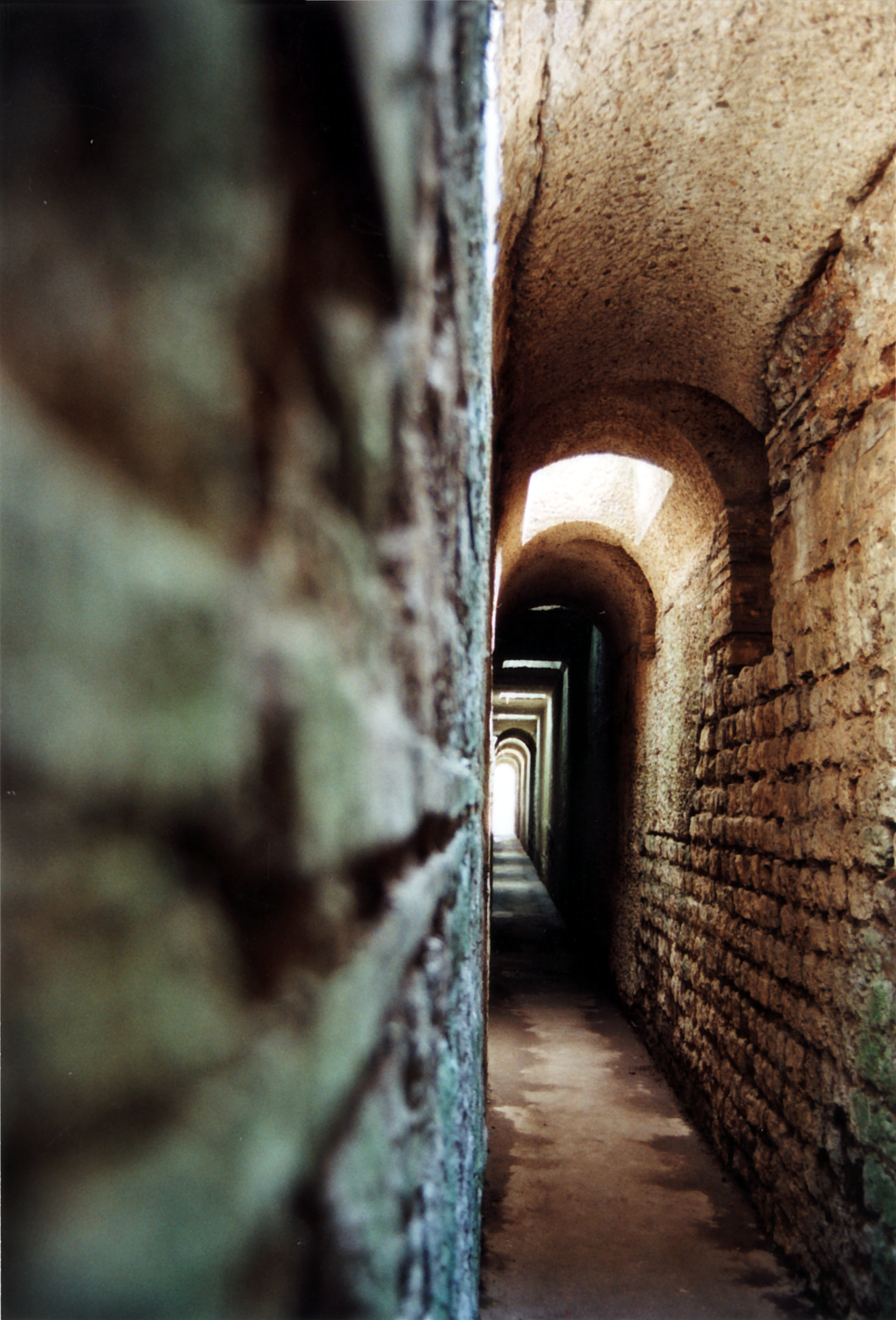

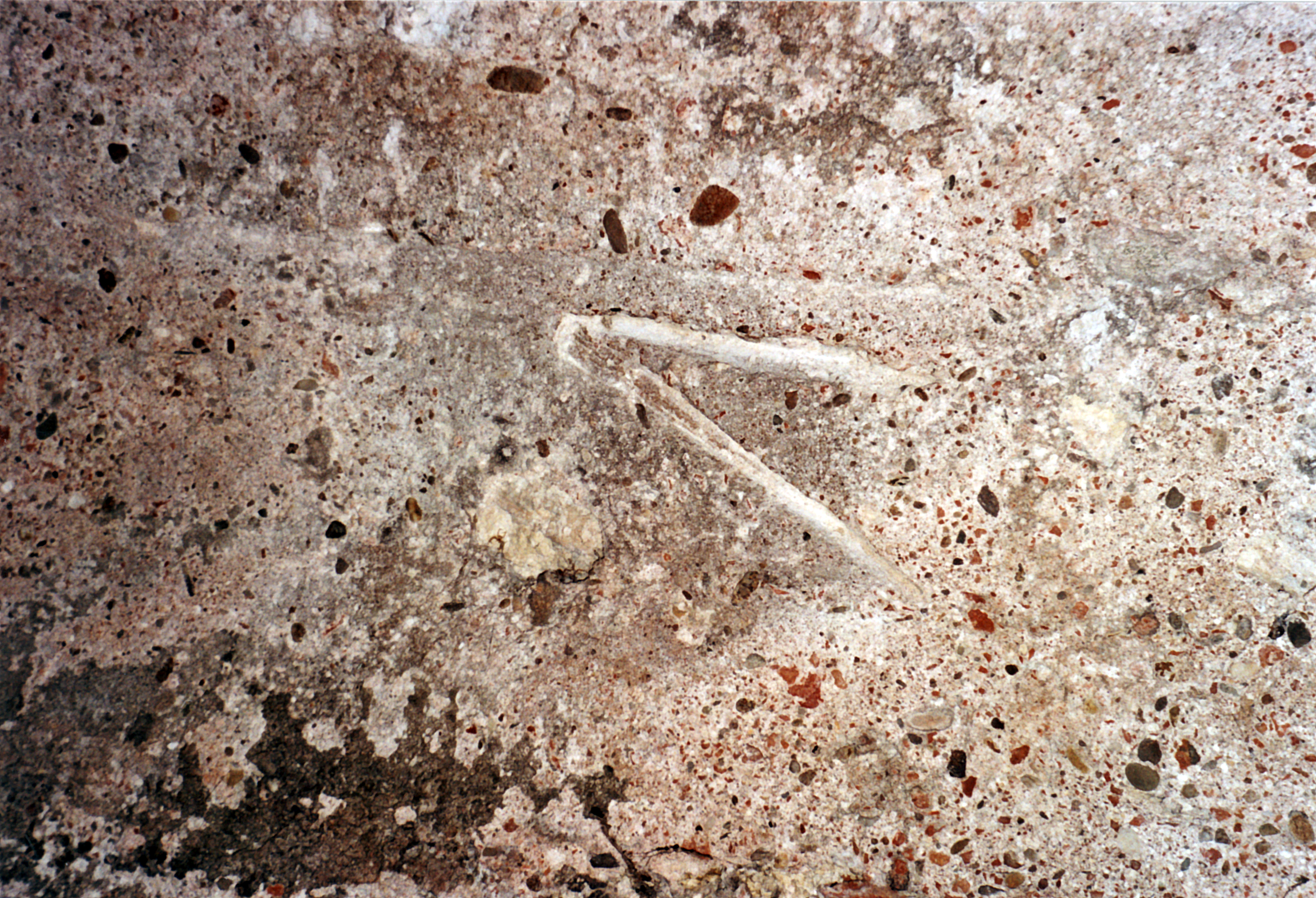

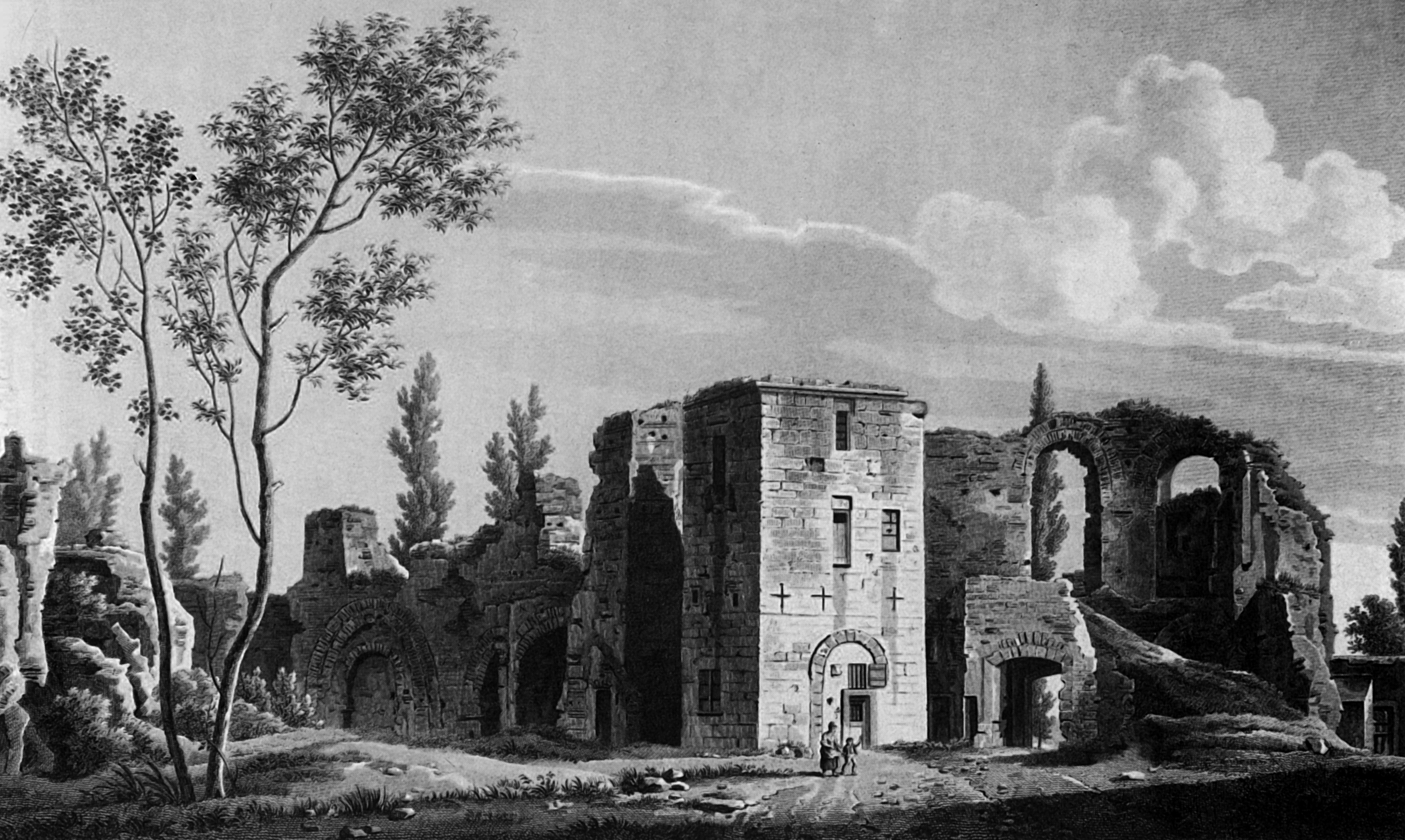

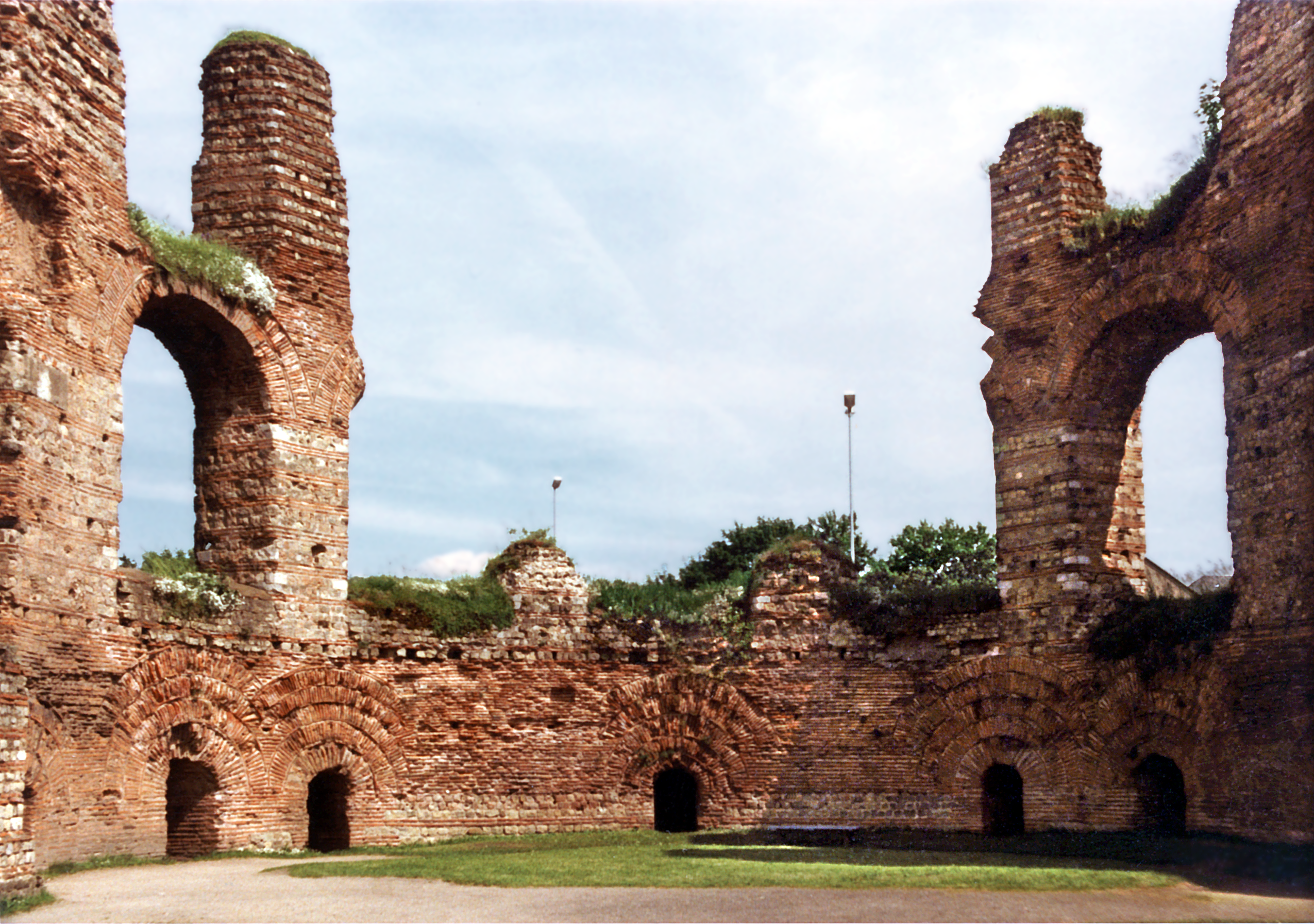
1983, before some restoration

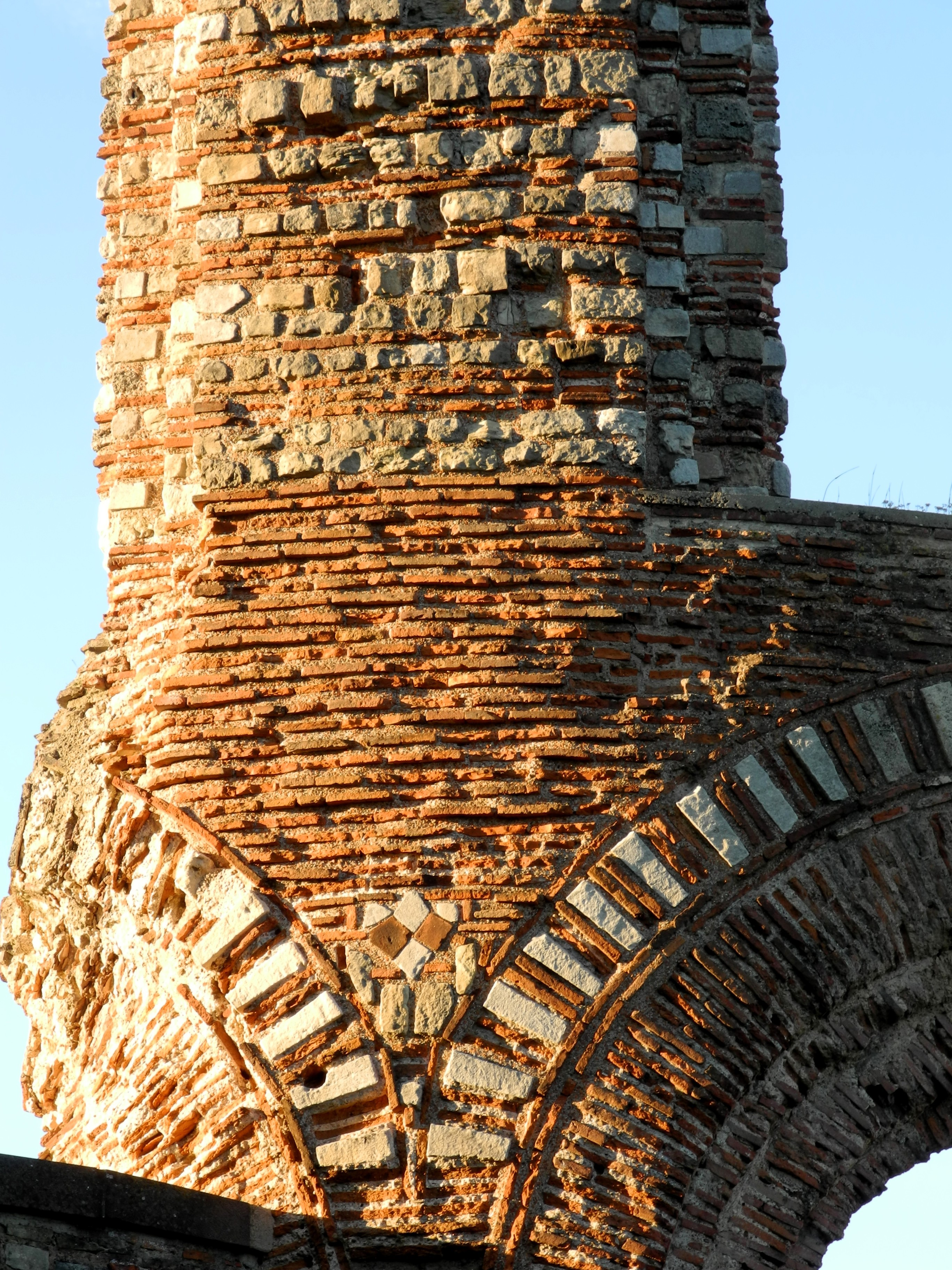

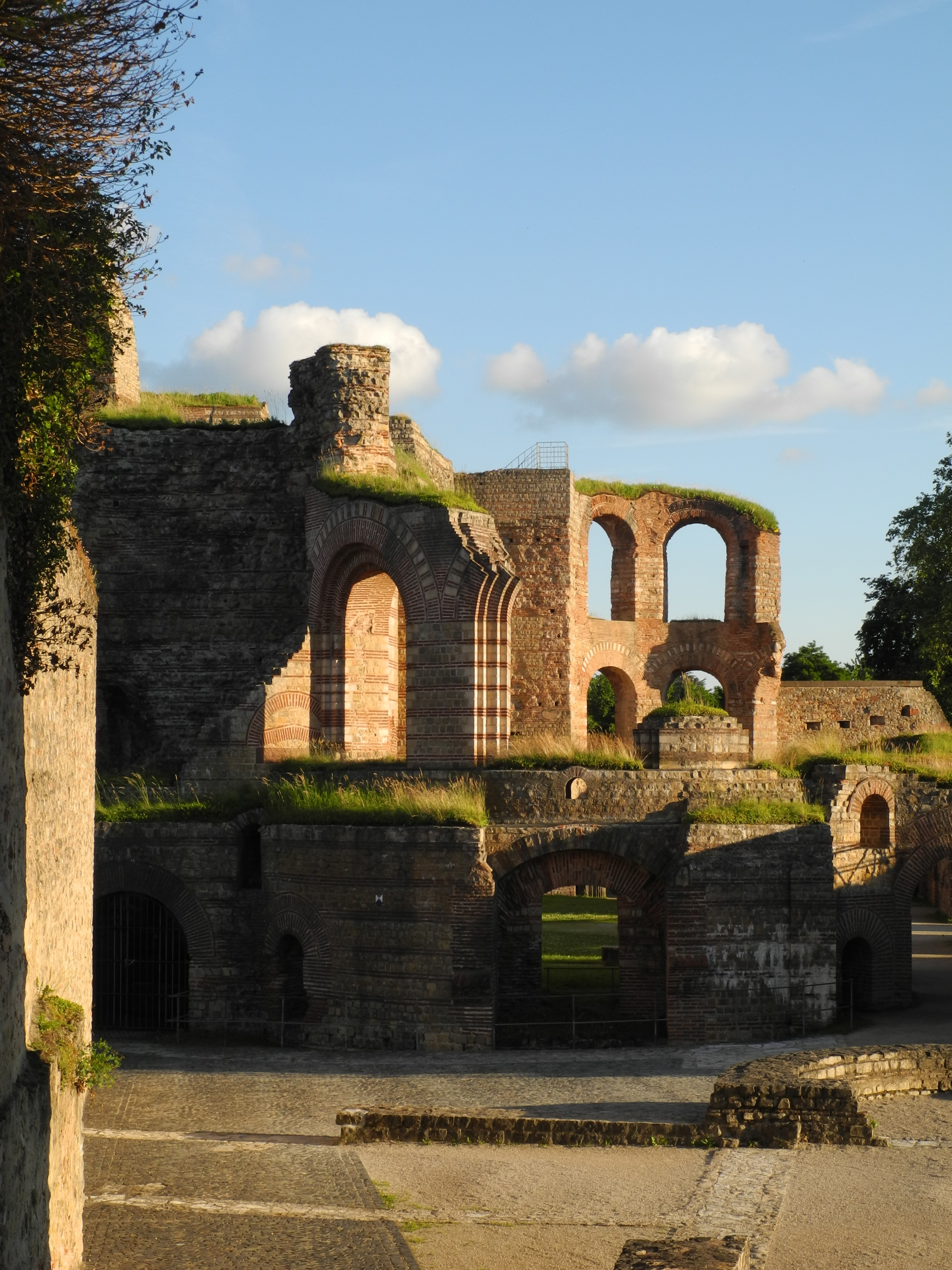

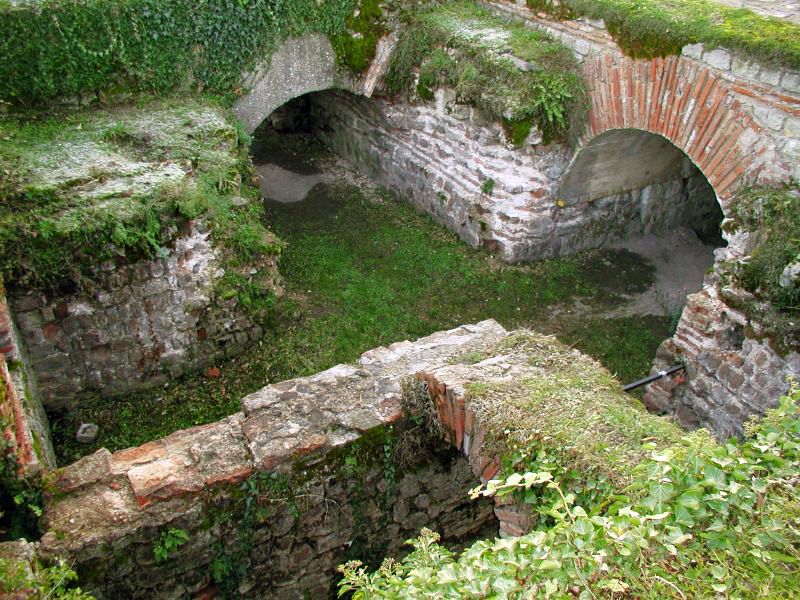
remains of walls and subterranean passages

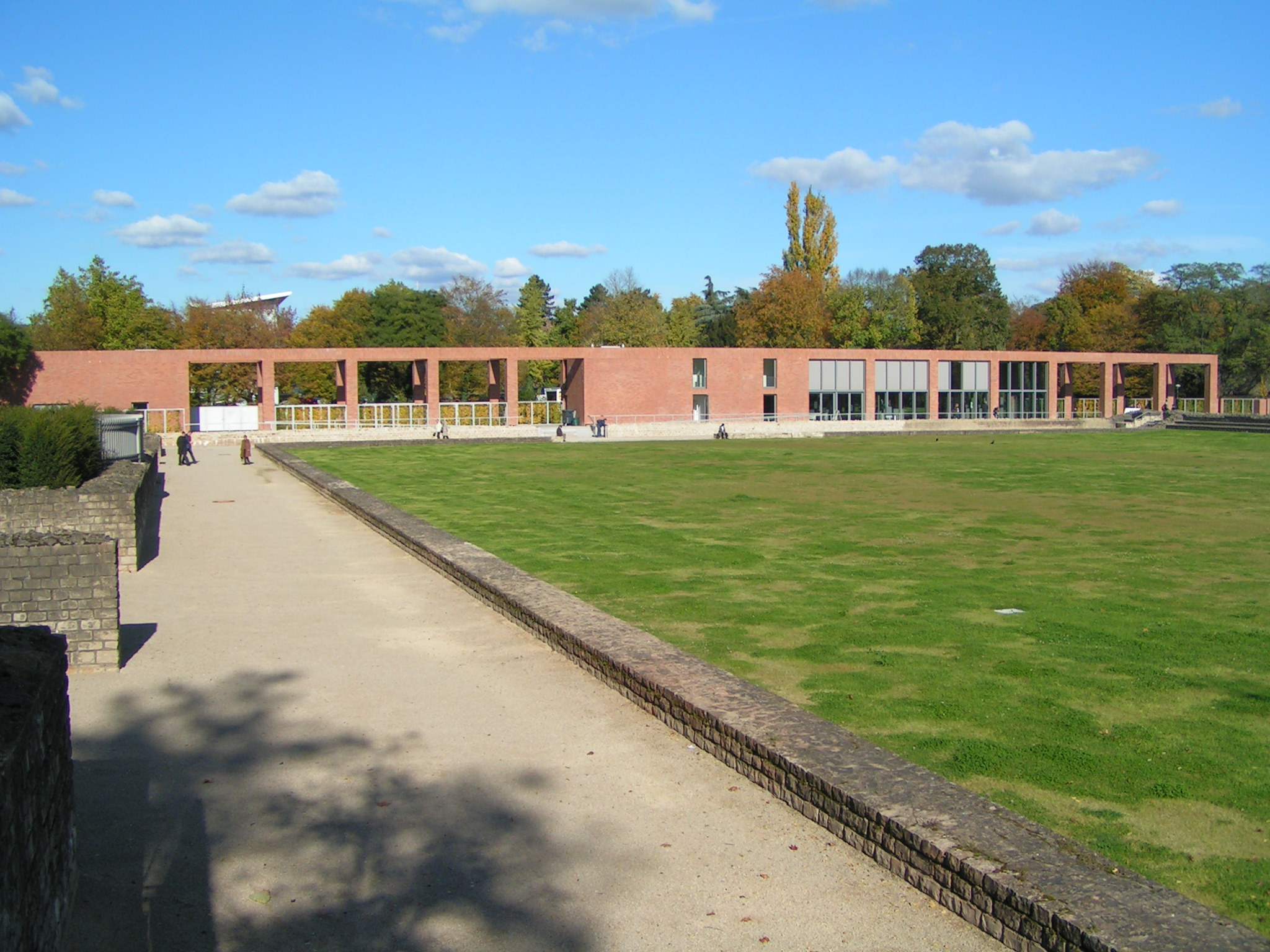

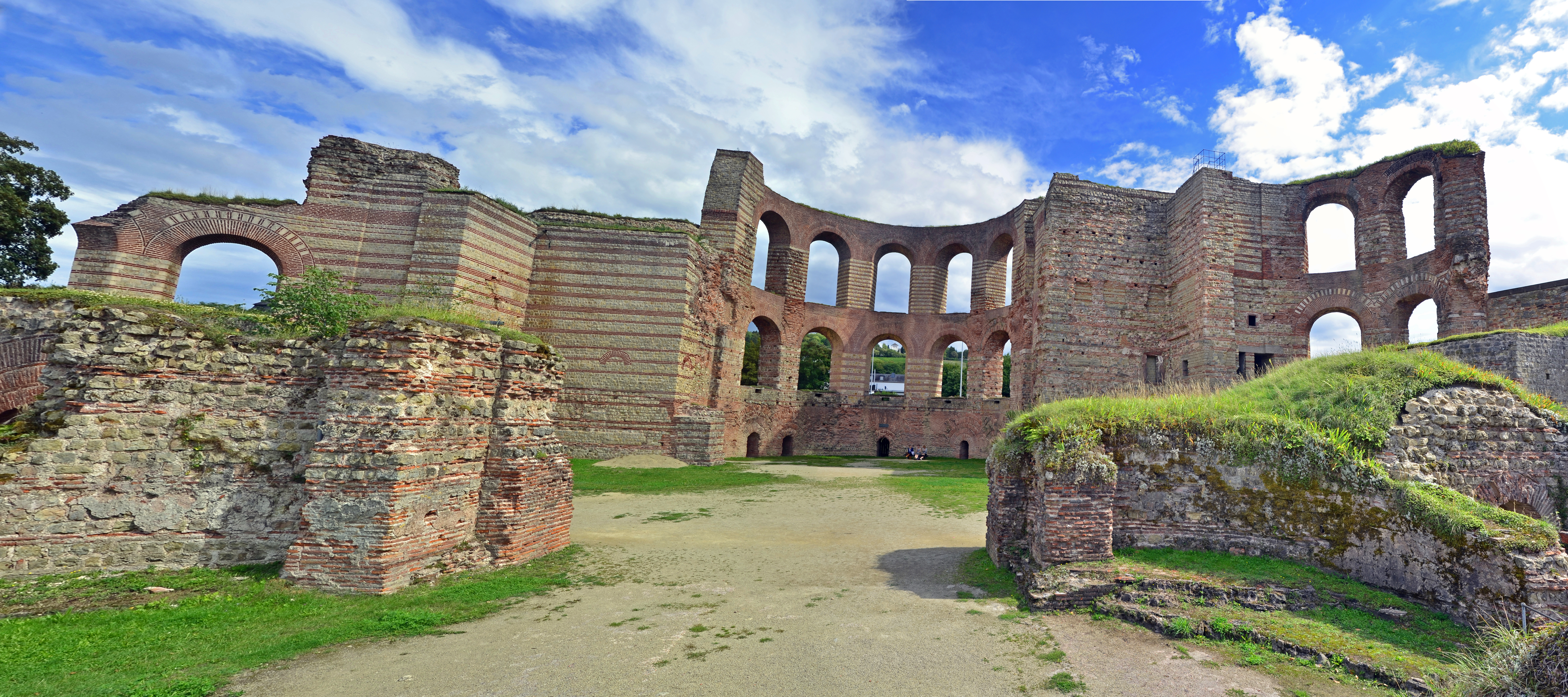

== See also ==
- Forum baths
- Barbara Baths
- List of Roman public baths
