= Barbara Baths =

UNESCO World Heritage Site
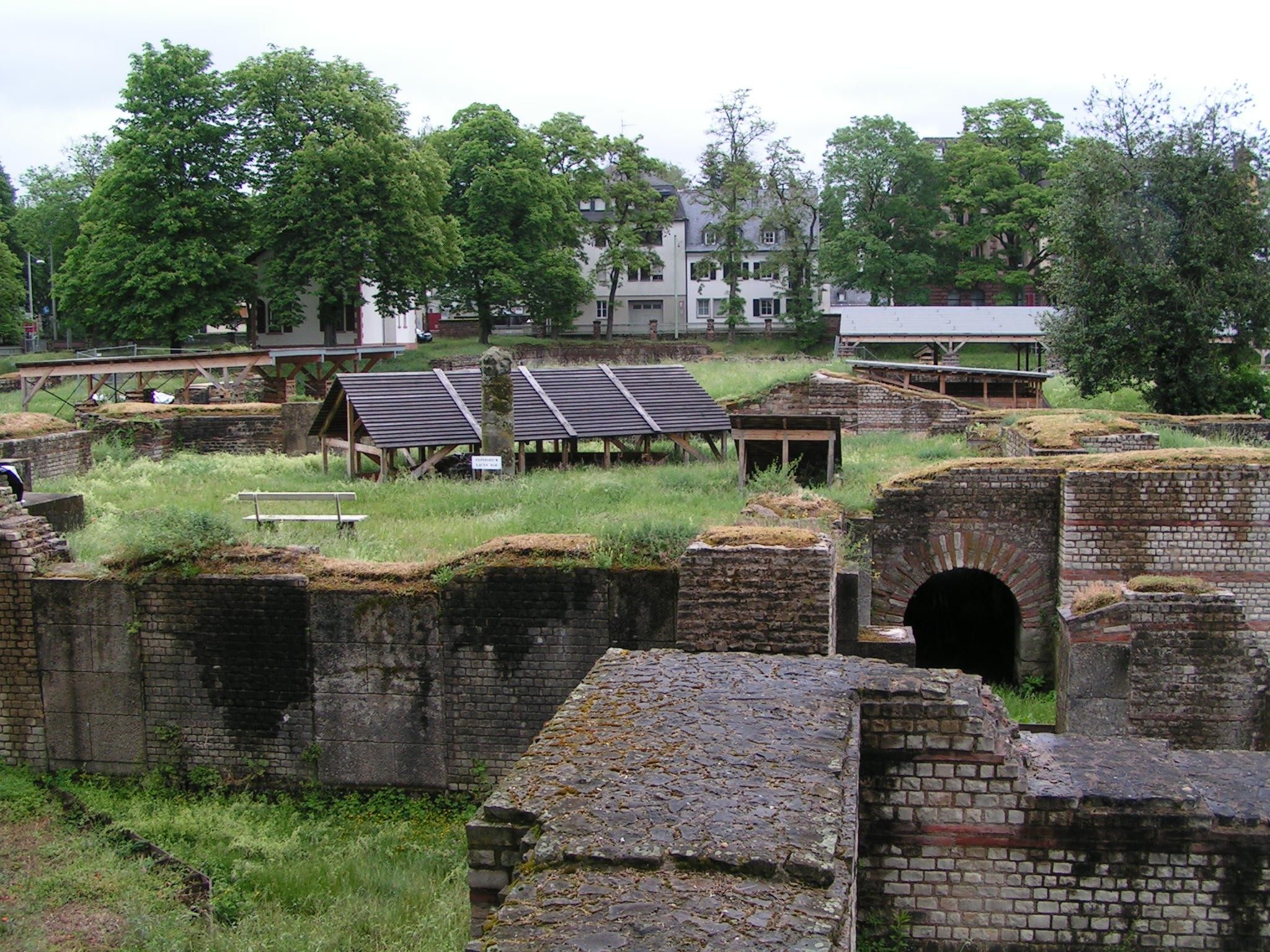
- Trier Barbarathermen

- Location within Germany Location within Rhineland-Palatinate
- Location: Trier, Rhineland-Palatinate, Germany
- Part of: Roman Monuments, Cathedral of St Peter and Church of Our Lady in Trier
- Criteria: Cultural: (i), (iii), (iv), (vi)
- Reference: 367-003
- Inscription: 1986 (10th Session)
- Coordinates: 49°45′00″N 6°37′49″E

The Barbara Baths (German: Barbarathermen) are a large Roman bath complex in Augusta Treverorum, modern-day Trier, Germany. Stretching over 42,000 square meters, it is the largest Roman bath north of the Alps. Along with other sites in Trier, the bath complex was designated a UNESCO World Heritage Site in 1986 as part of the Roman Monuments, Cathedral of St. Peter and Church of Our Lady in Trier site, because of its historical importance and sprawling architecture.

== History ==
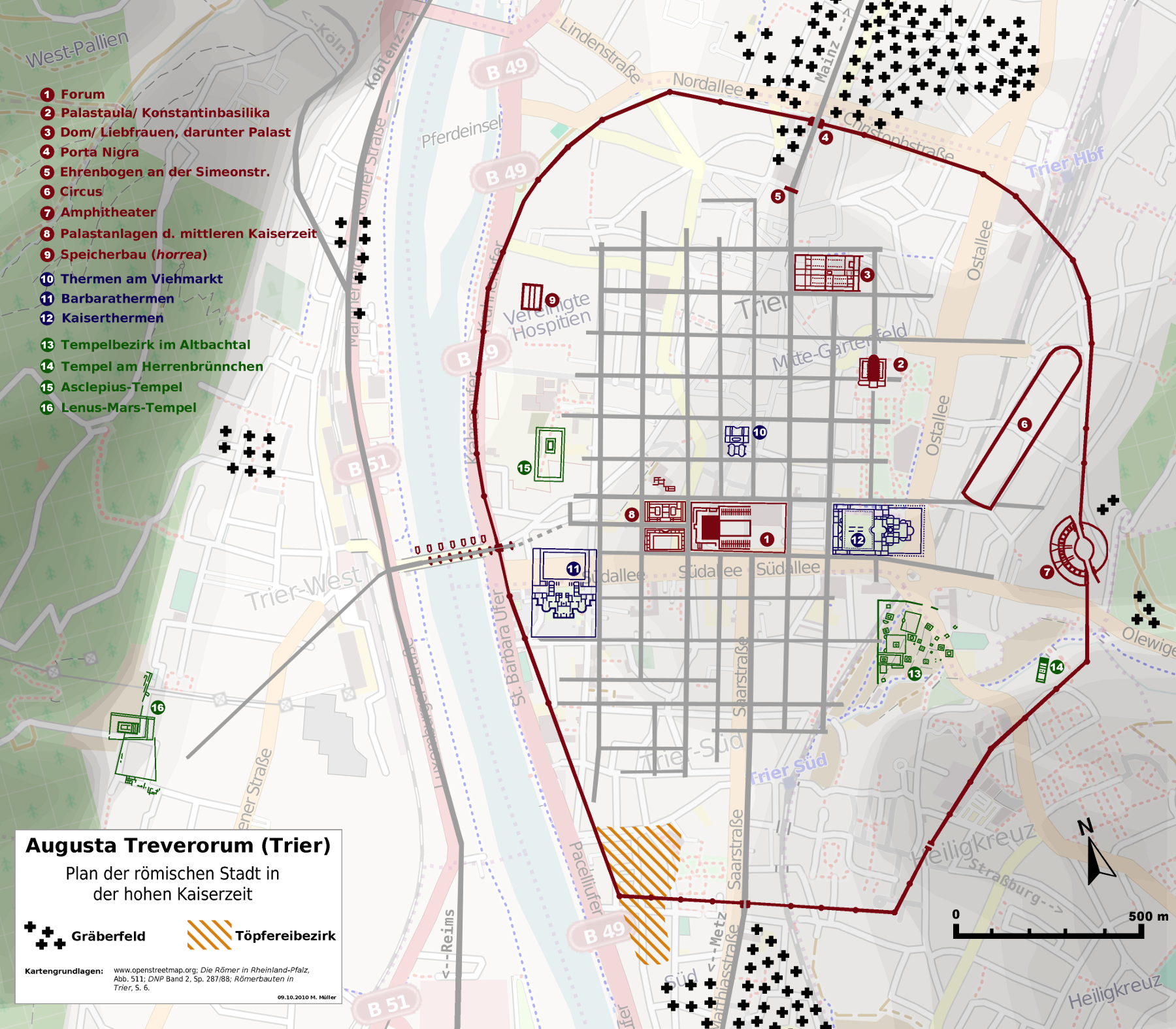
Augusta Treverorum Stadtplan

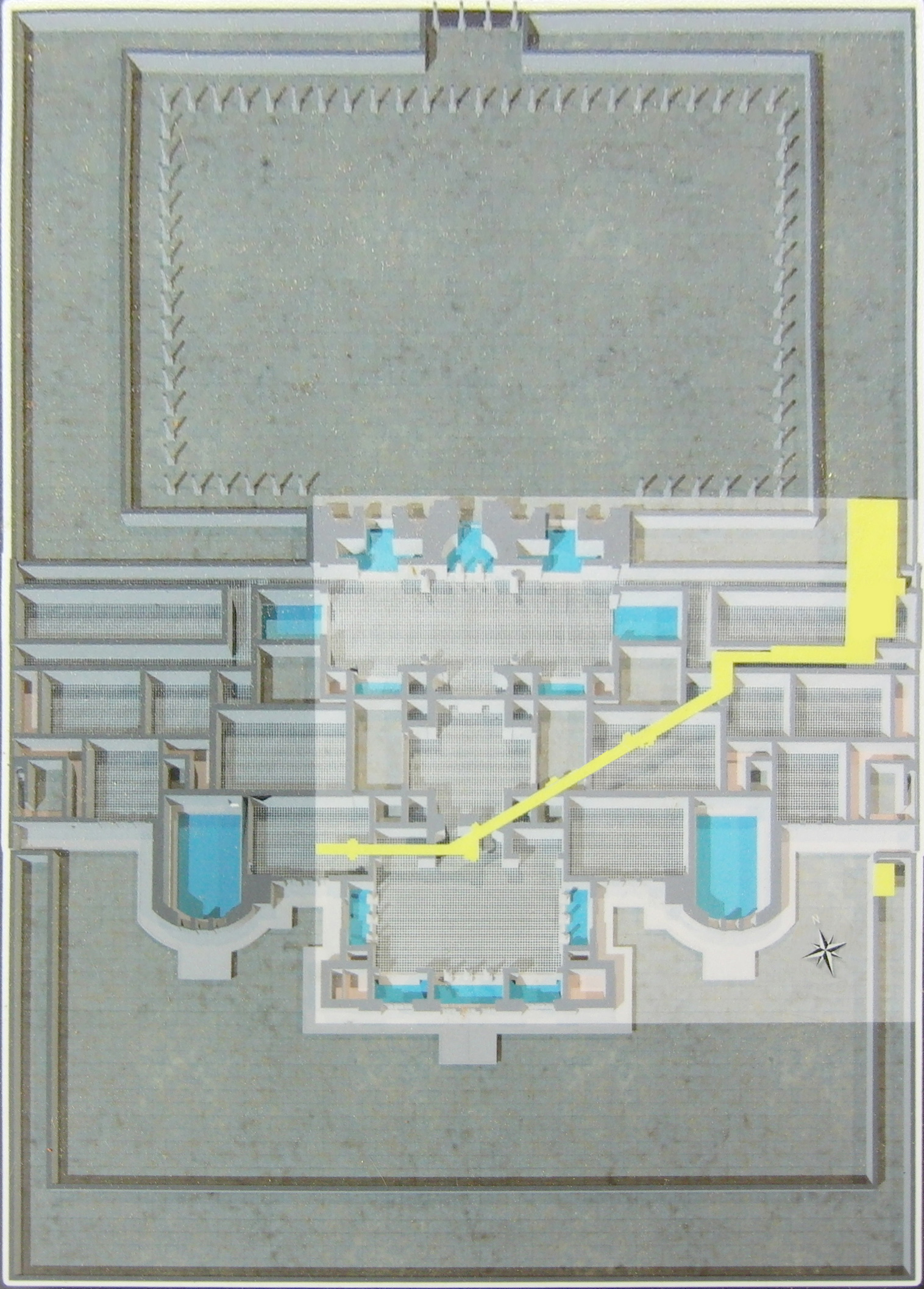
Floor plan of Barbara Baths with modern bridge and entrance marked in yellow

=== Roman Period ===
The Barbara Baths were built in the second half of the 2nd century C.E. along with a burst of building activity including a new bridge, an amphitheater and large forum. The Barbara Baths were built to meet the growing need for bathing in Trier when the Forum Baths became too small, the Barbara Baths, when completed, would measure 172 m x 240 m and encompass two city blocks. Their size would also increase demand for water, which would be supplied from the Ruwer aqueduct. This burst of activity appears to be a part of displays of wealth fitting the seat of the Roman Procurator of Gallia Belgica Germania Inferior and Germania Superior. The bathing rooms and swimming pool was modeled after baths from North Africa. The heated rooms of the bathhouse are notable for using a two-story hypocaust. A marble torso of an Amazon warrior, now in the Landesmuseum Mainz, indicates that the bath complex would have been elaborately decorated with imported statues from Italy. It remained in use through the end of the fourth century. But the complex fell out of use during the early fifth century as Trier was repeatedly sacked during the Migration Period.

=== Later usage ===
The extensive ruins were used as for many things following the collapse of the Western Roman Empire. As early as the 5th century C.E. there are recognizable remains of residential buildings, the beginnings of the suburb of St. Barbara. Early Christian grave inscriptions demonstrate a possible Merovingian period church. Later in the Middle ages fortifications were installed in the ruins as seen in Matthäus Merian and Alexandre Wiltheim's drawings. Stating in 1611 C.E. the remains were recycled as building material for constructing a Jesuit College, which was later destroyed.

=== Current Remains ===
Only the foundations and the subterranean service tunnels have survived, but the technical details of the sewer systems, the furnaces, the pools, and the heating system can be studied better than in the other two baths of Trier. The site is open to visitors and the remains can be viewed from a footbridge, with waysides along the bridge to help visitors.

== Gallery ==
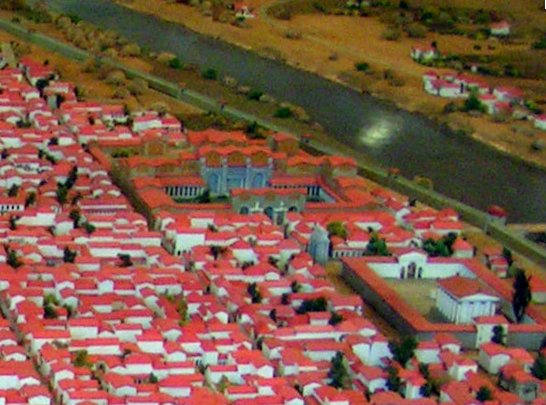
Model of Augusta Treverorum showing location of Barbarathermen Trier ca. 360–370 AD

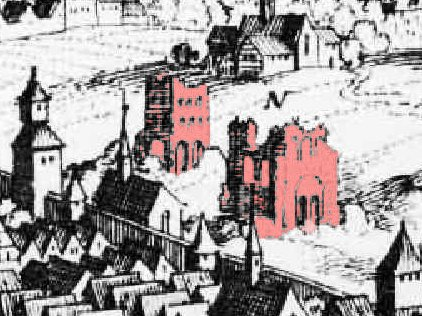
ca 1548 from an engraving by Matthäus Merian published 1646

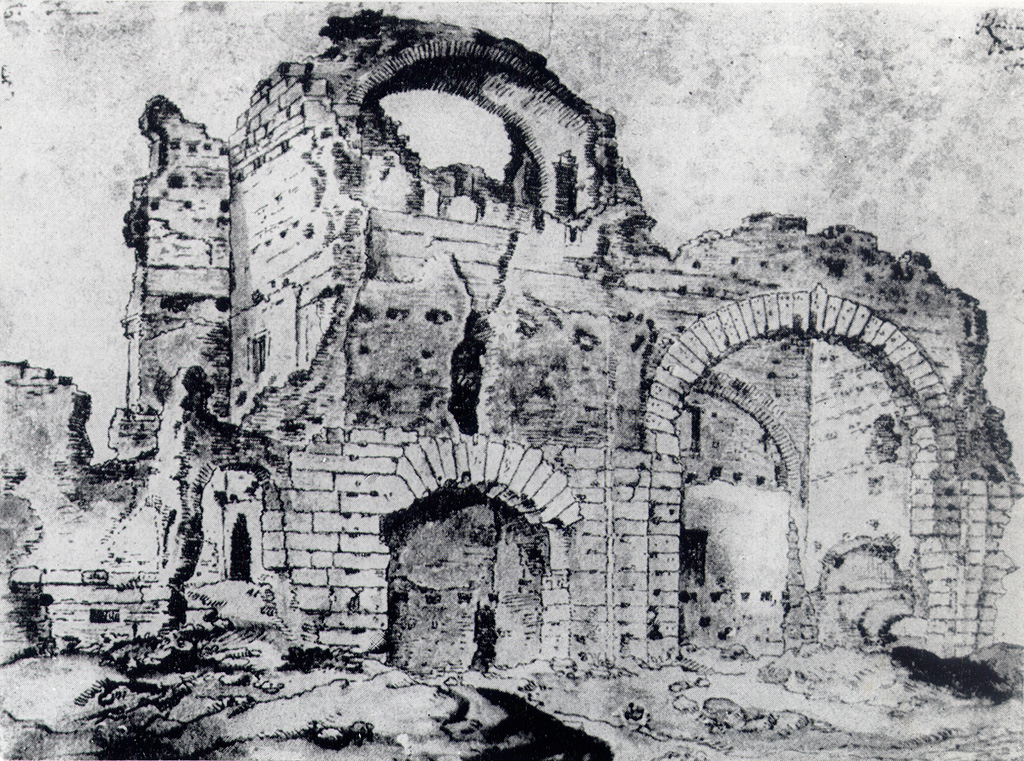
Ruins of Barbara Baths by Alexandre Wiltheim, c. 1620

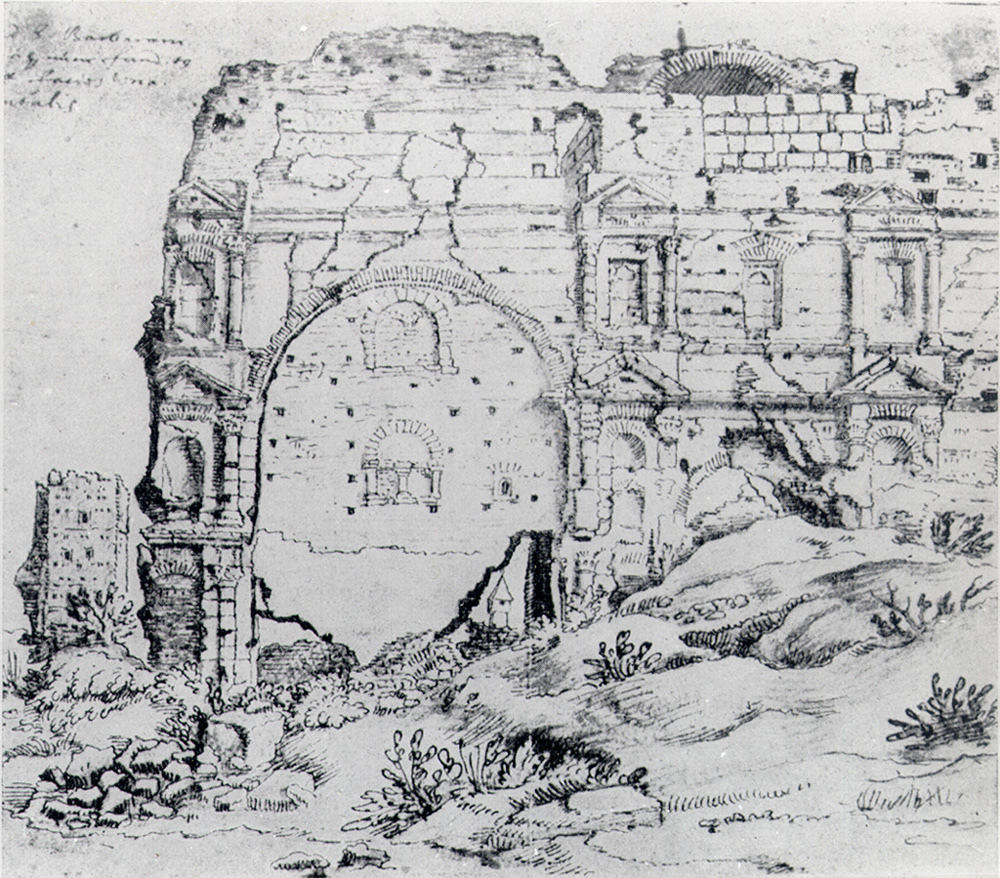
Ruins of Barbara Baths by Alexandre Wiltheim, c. 1620

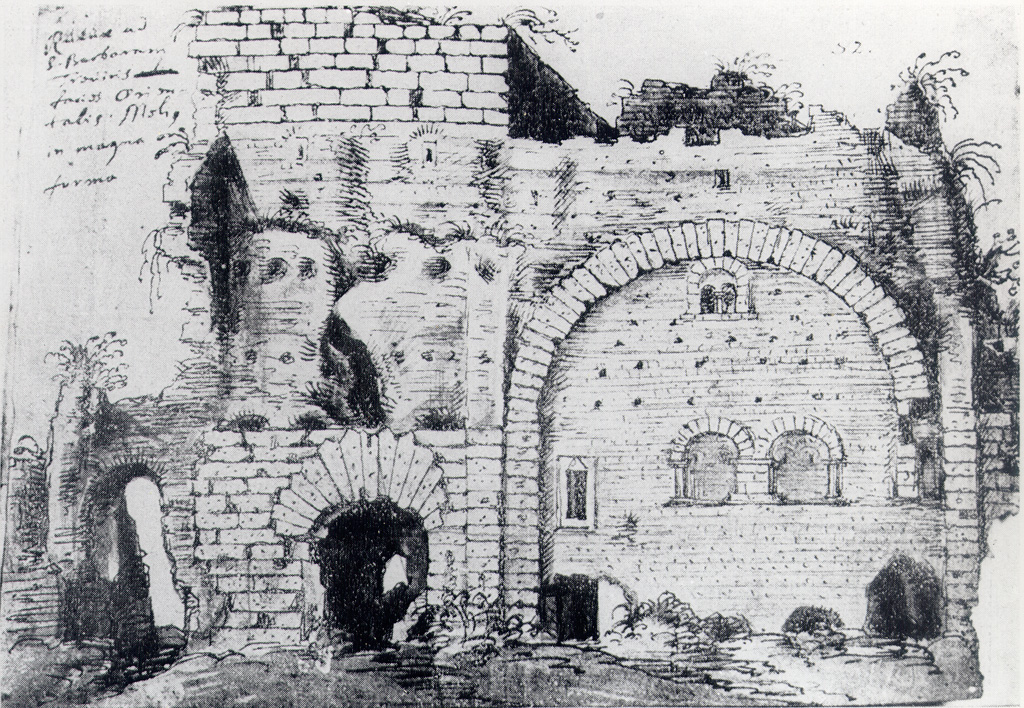
Ruins of Barbara Baths by Alexandre Wiltheim, c. 1620

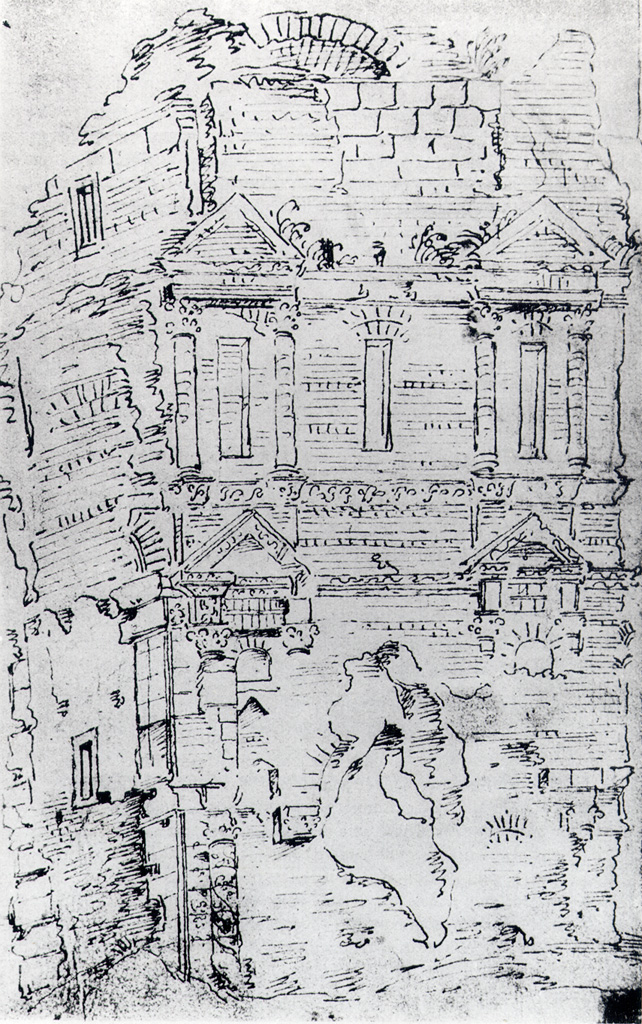
Ruins of Barbara Baths by Alexandre Wiltheim, c. 1620

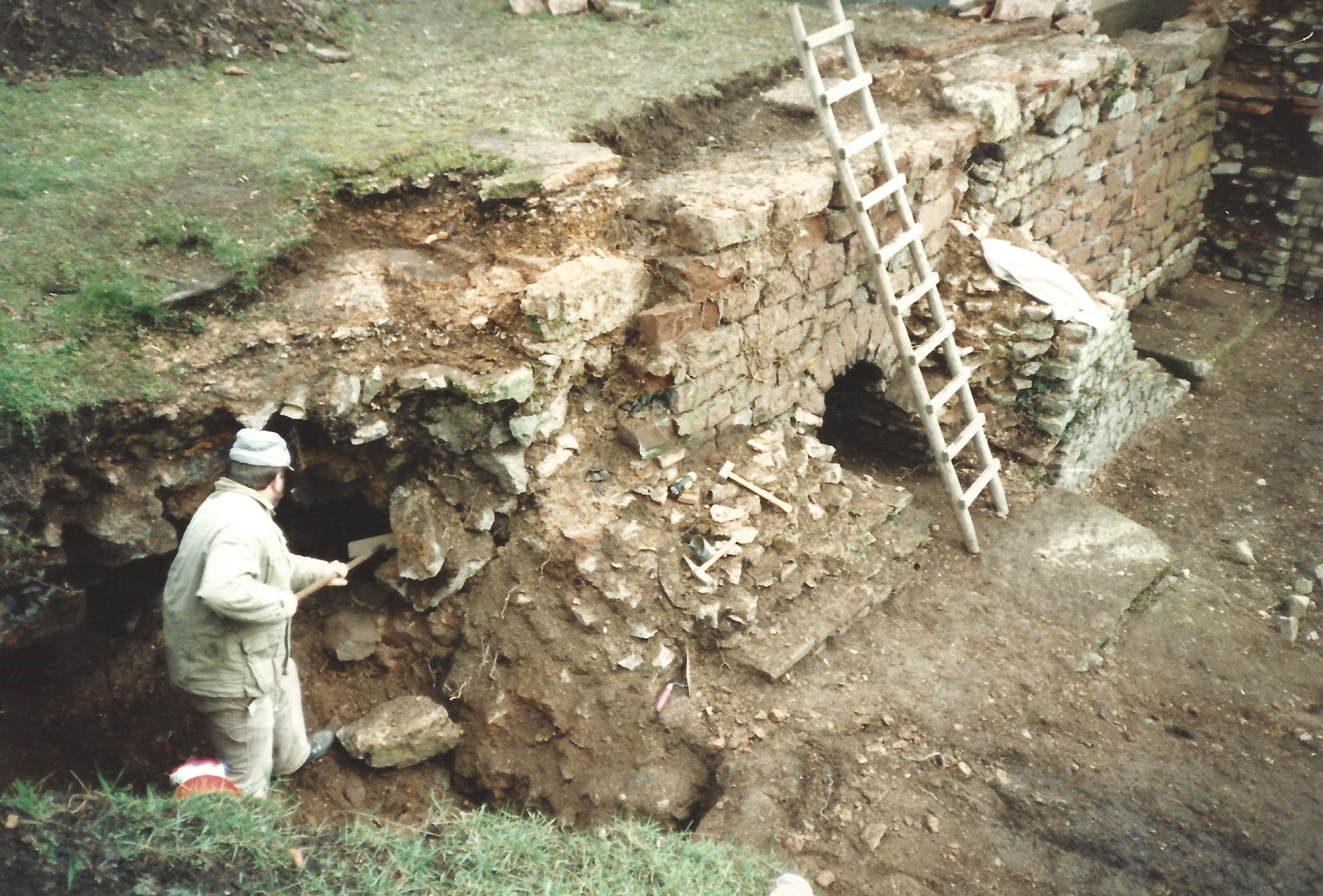
Conservation and restoration of the Roman ruins (1990)

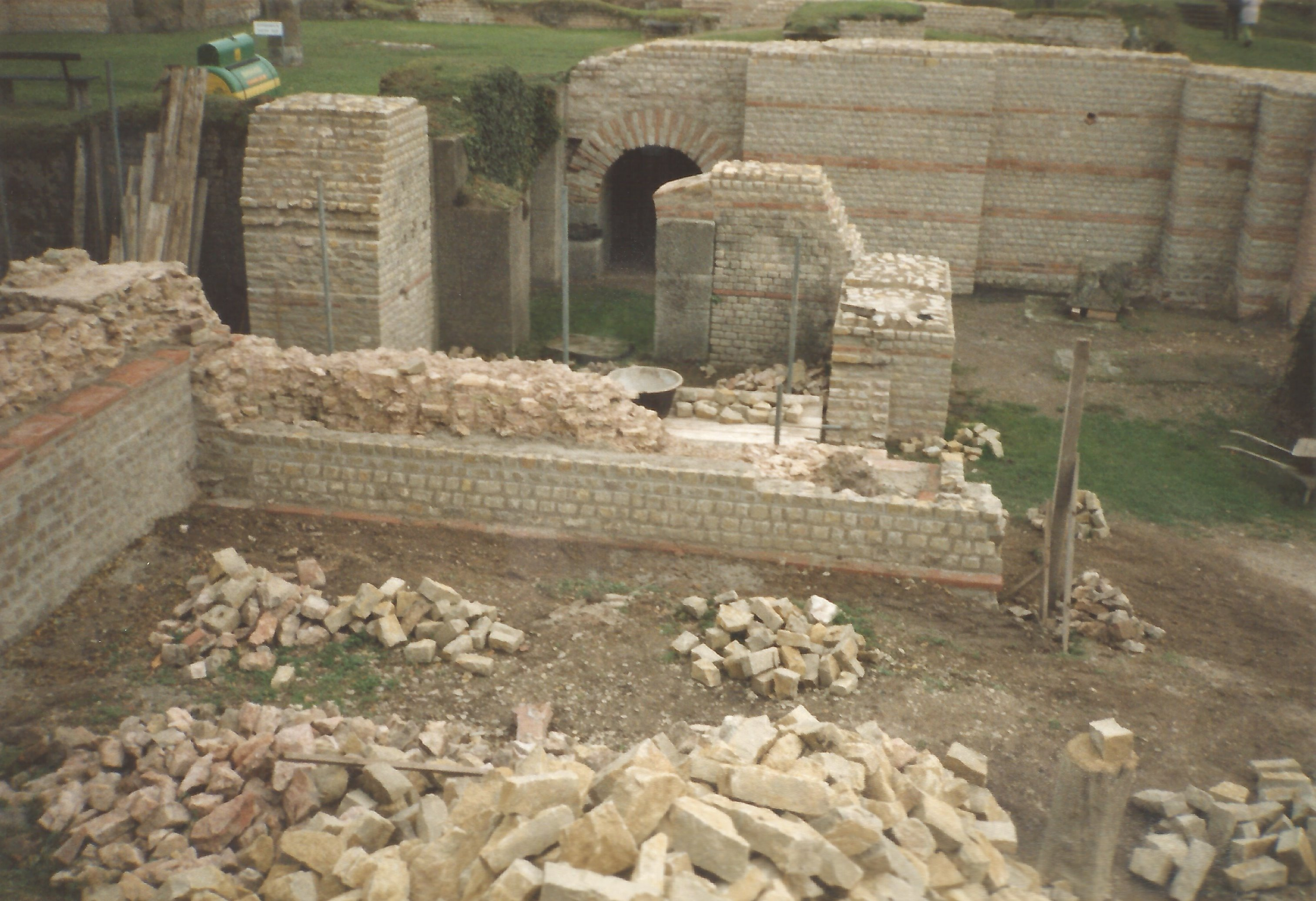
Conservation and restoration of the Roman ruins (1990)

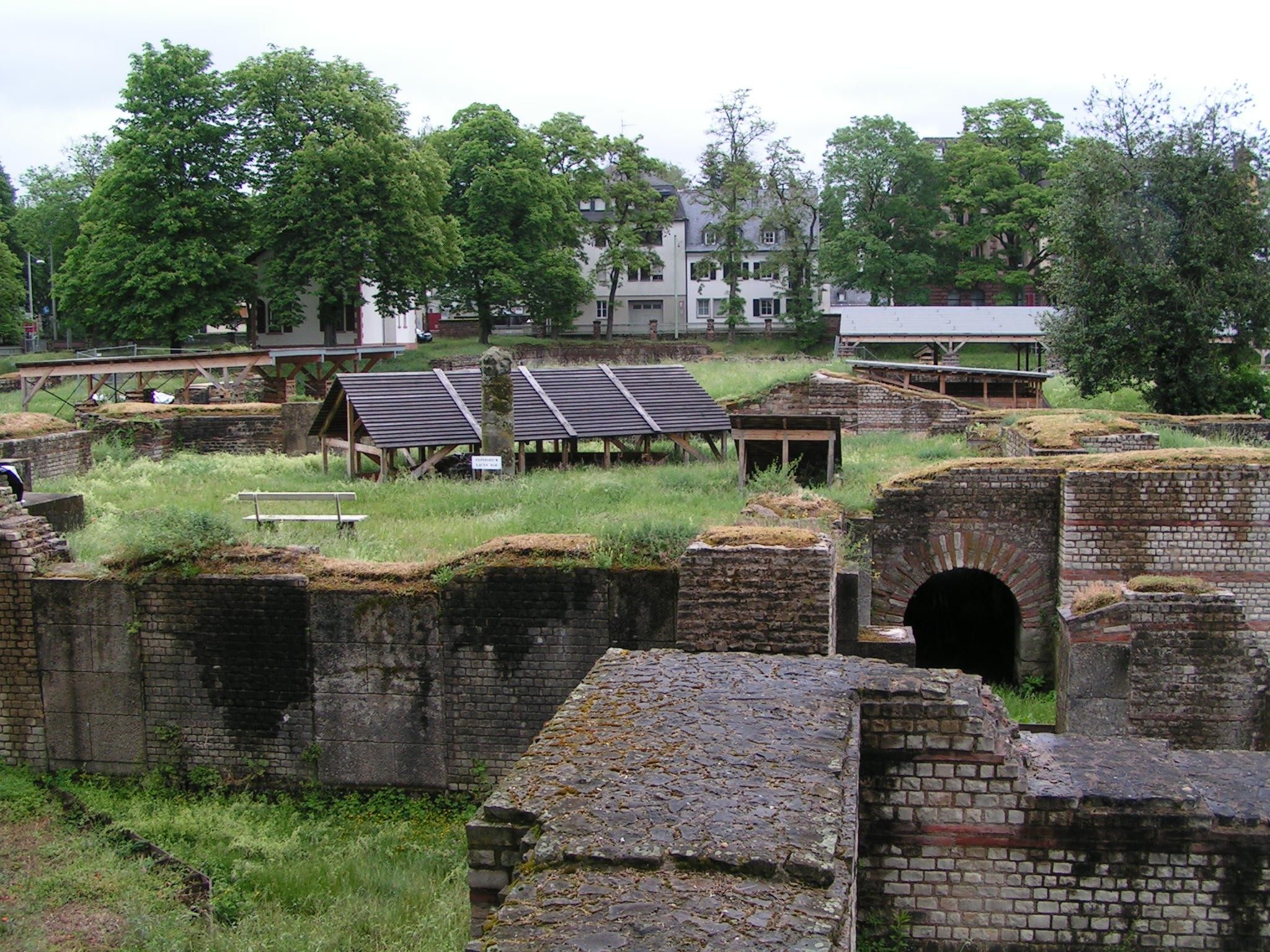
Barbara Baths Today

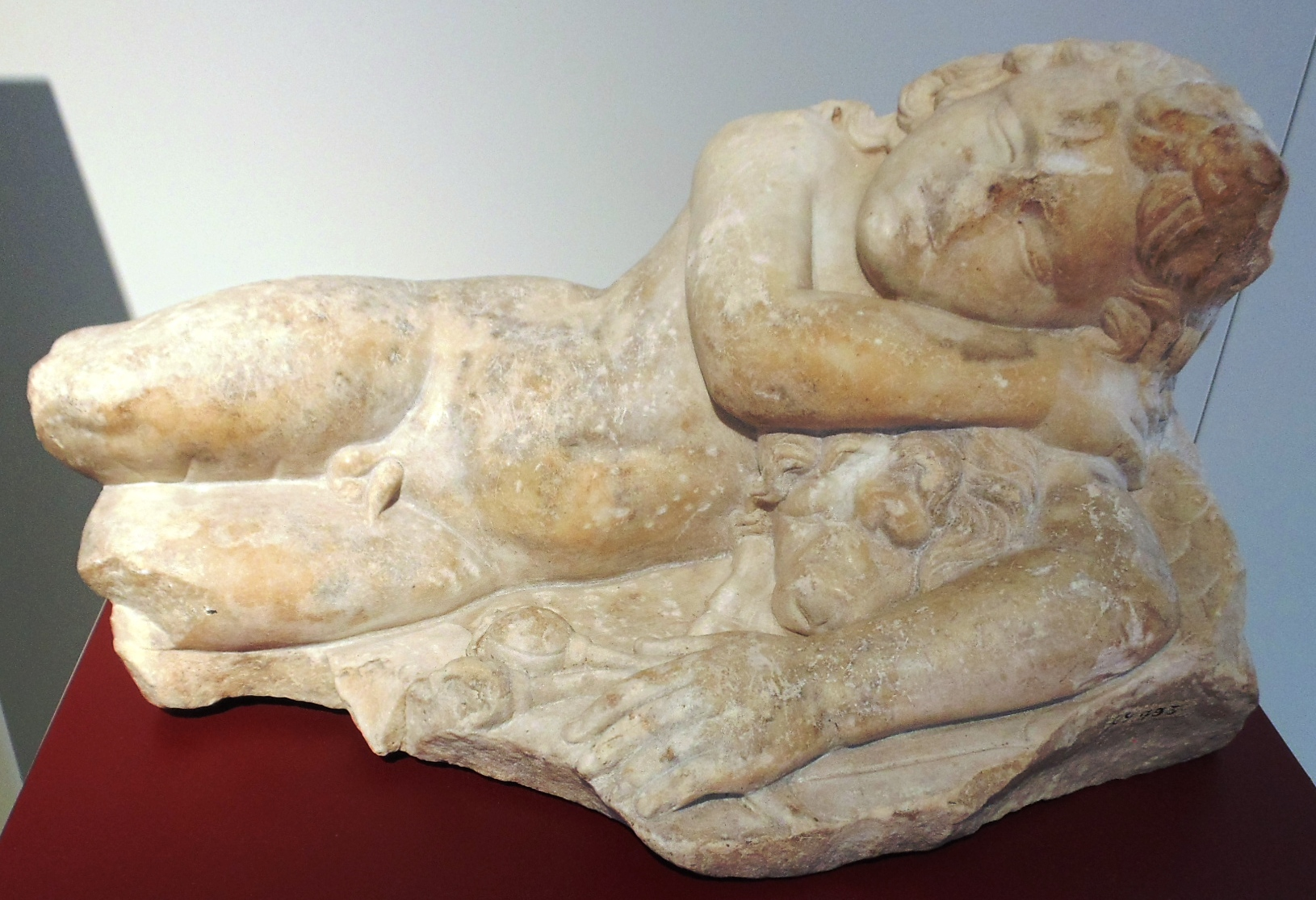
Sleeping Cupid in Rheinisches Landesmuseum Trier

== See also ==
- Ancient Roman bathing
- Thermae
- Forum Baths
- Trier Imperial Baths
- List of Roman public baths
